= Vladimir Kononov =

Vladimir Kononov may refer to:

- Vladimir Kononov (politician) (born 1958), Russian politician
- Vladimir Kononov (skier) (born 1972), Russian cross-country skier and Paralympian
- Vladimir Kononov (Donetsk People's Republic) (born 1974), ex-defence minister of the self-proclaimed Donetsk People's Republic
