= Angry patriots =

Russian political grouping

The Latin alphabet letter Z has become a prominent symbol of pro-war sentiment in Russia.

Angry patriots, (Note: Russian: рассерженные патриоты, romanized: rasserzhennye patrioty) also known as the war party, Z-patriots, (Note: Russian: Z-патриоты, romanized: Z-patrioty) turbopatriots, ultrapatriots, and megavatniks, are a loose group of Russian ultranationalist political commentators and milbloggers in support of the Russo-Ukrainian war, but critical of what they see as ineffective or incompetent prosecution of the war by the Russian government.

Political experts in Russia and in the United States have described the far-right ultranationalist opposition to Putin as possibly "the most serious challenge" to the Russian regime.

== Notable members and organizations ==
A notable organization in the movement is the Club of Angry Patriots, founded in April 2023 by former Russian Federal Security Service (FSB) agent and militant leader Igor Girkin, who is also known as Igor Strelkov. Girkin himself has been described as the "most prominent voice" within the Z-patriot sphere. The "club" also prominently includes Girkin's fellow Donetsk People's Republic leader Pavel Gubarev and Russian nationalist writer Maxim Kalashnikov.

== History ==
=== Before the full-scale invasion of Ukraine ===
Before Russia's 2014 annexation of Crimea, ultranationalists were largely on the fringes of Russian politics. The annexation brought these groups into "the Kremlin's ideological big tent".

Prominent Russian liberal opposition figure Alexei Navalny said before his 2020 poisoning that the Kremlin was "far more afraid of ultra-nationalists than they were of him", noting that "[the ultranationalists] use the same imperial rhetoric as Putin does, but they can do it much better than him".

=== Rise to prominence ===
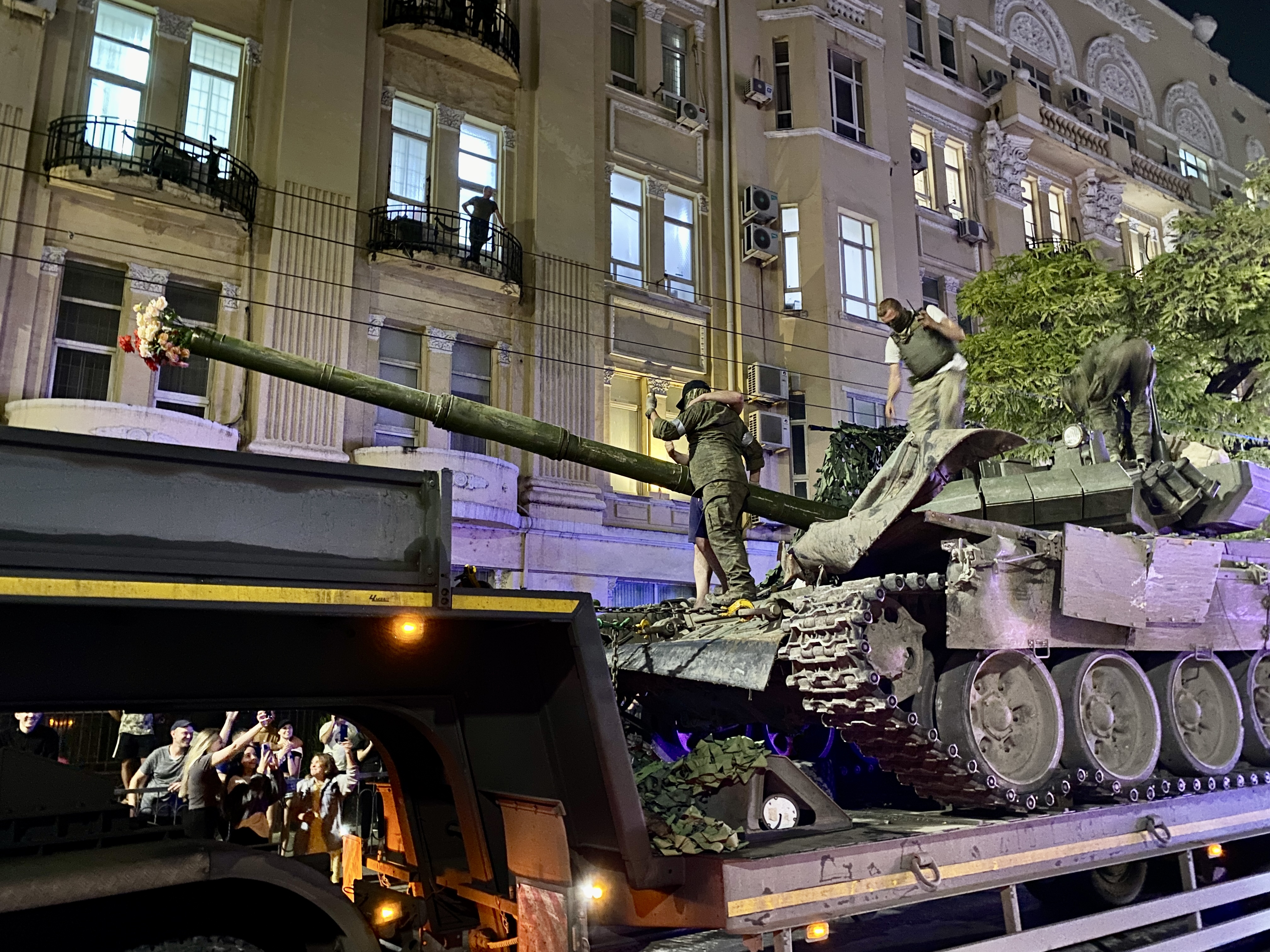
Wagner Group military equipment in Rostov-on-Don during the Wagner Group rebellion, June 2023

During the full-scale war, the group has gained increased prominence and power. In mid-2022, after the collapse of the Russian frontline in the northeast due to the Ukrainian 2022 Kharkiv counteroffensive, the ultranationalist faction reacted with rage and frustration. Several ultranationalists, including Girkin, called for nuclear strikes against Ukraine and other forms of escalation. Kremlin spokesman Dmitry Peskov responded to the criticism, saying that there was room for some "critical points of view, as long as they remain within the law", but warning that "the line is very, very thin, one must be very careful here".

In December 2022, during the bloody battle of Bakhmut, Yevgeny Prigozhin, leader of the Russian paramilitary Wagner Group that was doing much of the fighting in the city, began to harshly criticize the Russian Ministry of Defense for what he saw as incompetence and corruption in the leadership. A Wagner Group–Russian Ministry of Defence conflict continued for the following months.

On 1 April 2023, a group of Russian ultranationalists led by Igor Girkin announced the formation of the Club of Angry Patriots. Speaking to reporters, Girkin said that a struggle was beginning within the Russian elite for a "post-Putin" era. On 2 April, Vladlen Tatarsky, a former militant who fought in the war in Donbas and later became a pro-Russia milblogger in the "angry patriot" sphere, was assassinated in the 2023 Saint Petersburg bombing. Tatarsky—real name Maxim Fomin—was one of the more prominent milbloggers in Russia, and had been repeatedly critical of the Russian Ministry of Defense. Russian political analyst Tatiana Stanovaya said that whether the assassination had been performed by Ukrainian or Russian government agents, the assassination would leave Russia's "patriotic camp [...] feeling exposed and potentially at risk".

In June 2023, the Wagner-Ministry of Defense conflict culminated in Prigozhin launching a brief armed rebellion against the Ministry of Defense. which ended in a peaceful settlement.

=== Crackdown on far-right criticism ===
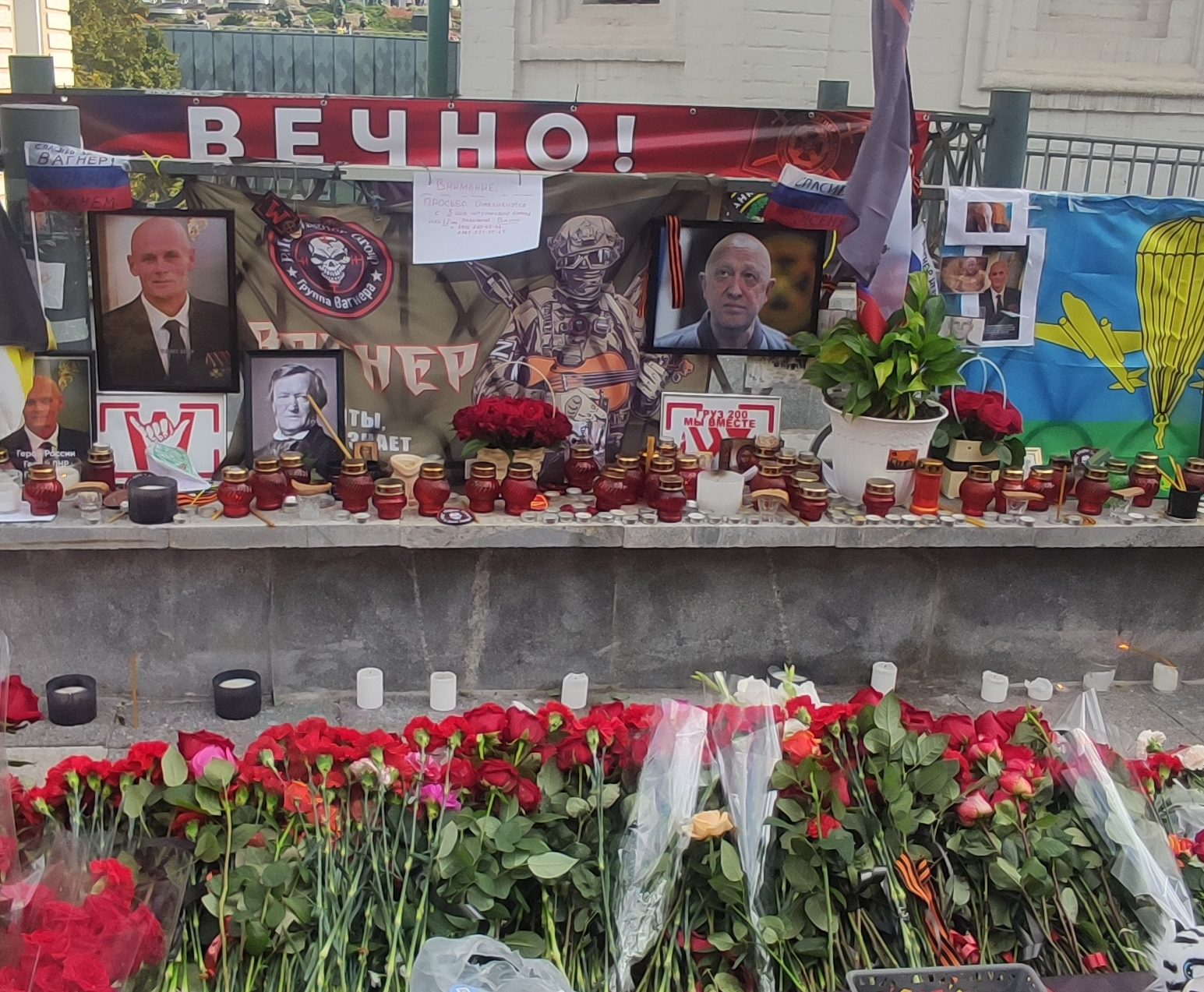
A makeshift memorial to Yevgeny Prigozhin and Dmitry Utkin in Moscow after their deaths in the 2023 Wagner Group plane crash

In the wake of the failed rebellion, Prigozhin "sharply curtailed" his verbal attacks against authorities. In July 2023, Igor Girkin was arrested and charged with "inciting extremism" by Russian authorities, ending a long period over which he was considered "untouchable" due to his history and government connections. Some Western commentators analyzed the events as signalling a larger trend of cracking down on far-right criticism.

On 23 August 2023, exactly two months after the rebellion, Prigozhin was killed along with nine other people when a business jet crashed in Tver Oblast, north of Moscow. The Wall Street Journal cited sources within the US government as saying that the crash was likely caused by a bomb on board or "some other form of sabotage". International relations expert Sam Ramani said that "in the short term, [the death of the Wagner Group leadership] clamps down on any kind of ultranationalist unrest", but predicted that ultranationalist opposition may consolidate again in the future, particularly at the time of the 2024 Russian presidential election.

In November 2023, Igor Girkin announced his intention to run as a candidate in the 2024 elections, describing elections in Russia as a "sham" in which "the only winner [referring to Putin] is known in advance". On 24 December 2023, hundreds of people gathered for a demonstration in Moscow in which they expressed their support for Girkin's candidacy.

Girkin appeared in court in Moscow in 2024 on charges of inciting extremism. He was convicted of the charges on January 25. When the verdict was read out, Girkin reportedly shouted "I serve the Fatherland!" He was sentenced to imprisonment in a penal colony for four years. Girkin's lawyer said the verdict was "an ugly judicial act" and would be appealed "immediately".

== See also ==
- Far-right politics in Russia
- Russian nationalism
