= Club of Angry Patriots =

Hardline nationalist political movement in Russia

Club of Angry Patriots Клуб рассерженных патриотов
- Abbreviation: KRP
- Leader: Igor Girkin
- Chairman: Pavel Gubarev
- Founders: Igor Girkin; Pavel Gubarev; Maxim Kalashnikov; Viktor Alksnis; Yevgeny Mikhailov; Mikhail Aksel
- Founded: 1 April 2023
- Ideology: Russian nationalism
- Colours: Black; Gold; White
- Slogan: "Everything for the front, everything for Victory, glory to Russia!" (Russian: «Всё для фронта, всё для Победы, слава России!»)

Website
- vk.com/krprus/

The Club of Angry Patriots (KRP; Russian: Клуб рассерженных патриотов, romanized: Klub rasserzhennykh patriotov) is a Russian hardline nationalist social movement founded on 1 April 2023 by Igor Girkin, Pavel Gubarev and Maxim Kalashnikov. The club criticizes the current Russian government for perceived half-measures and inability to win the war against Ukraine.

== Background ==
Girkin had previously created movements that criticized the Kremlin and the liberal opposition at the same time, such as the January 25 Committee, created in 2016. In May of that year, the January 25 Committee was renamed the All-Russian National Movement under the leadership of Girkin.

The term "angry patriots" (Russian: рассерженные патриоты), which has already become a staple in Russian political circles, refers to people who actively support the Russian invasion of Ukraine, but are dissatisfied with its course: slow progress, losses, exchanges of Azov Battalion POWs, lack of response to shellings of Russian cities, etc.

== History ==
Two weeks before the official announcement of the creation of the club, on 17 March 2023, Igor Girkin, on behalf of the club, posted a post on Telegram, in which he listed the weak points, in his opinion, in the conduct of the "special military operation".

On 1 April 2023, the establishment of the club was announced. In addition to Girkin, the club includes Pavel Gubarev, Vladimir Grubnik, Viktor Alksnis, Maxim Kalashnikov, Maxim Klimov, Mikhail Aksel and Yevgeny Mikhailov. Members of the club called it "a community of patriotic people who have been serving Russia for many years, not in word, but in deed". According to Girkin, "It is necessary to create an association of those people who are not for money, who are really for the Motherland, for our people, for our country”

The Other Russia of E. V. Limonov participated in organizing meetings and press conferences of the club in May 2023.

The movement is reportedly facing resentment from the head of the Donetsk People's Republic, Denis Pushilin. Girkin claimed that Pushilin ordered DNR officials to spread rumors about the Club of Angry Patriots stating that the movement was plotting a coup. The group also accuses Pushilin of trying to discredit them.

Girkin was arrested by Russian authorities on 21 July 2023, on charges of extremism and sentenced to four years of imprisonment in a penal colony by the Moscow City Court in January 2024.

== Ideology and goals ==
Club members said Russia would inevitably face defeat in Ukraine and could endure a pro-Western coup or civil war unless Moscow radically improves the situation on the front lines. Participants argued that Russian officials are unable to improve the military operations and their impact on Russian society because most Kremlin officials belong to the anti-war faction. The club claimed it was seeking to help the Russian authorities complete a "special military operation" in a timely manner, arguing that a protracted war in Ukraine could spur anti-war officials to revolt. The group also said it was trying to create a defense network to counter a coup in Russia in such a case.

Compared to the January 25 Committee, the emphasis has shifted greatly from opposition to a liberal "Moscow Maidan" to the need to prevent "Russia's military defeat in its proxy war with the entire NATO bloc in Ukraine".

The Institute for the Study of War expressed the opinion that the creation of the club is connected with the desire to strengthen the pro-war faction within the Kremlin.

== See also ==
- Black Hundreds
- Serbian Radical Party
