= Vladimir Kononov (Donetsk People's Republic) =

Former Defence Minister of the self-proclaimed Donetsk People's Republic

Major general Vladimir Kononov
- Владимир Кононов
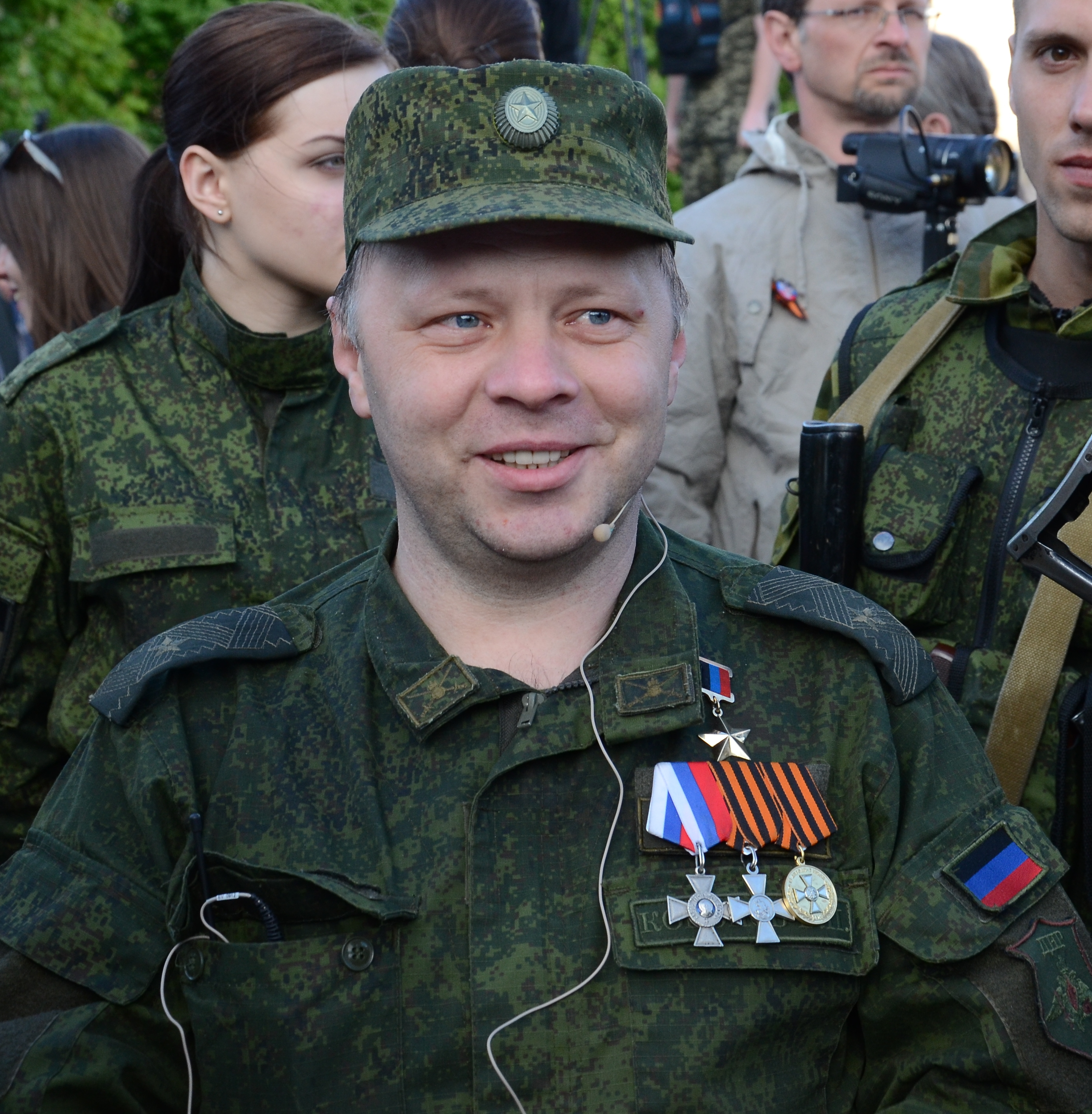
- Kononov at the 2015 DPR Victory Day Parade

Minister of Defence of the Donetsk People's Republic
- In office 15 August 2014 – 1 October 2018
- President: Pavel Gubarev; Alexander Zakharchenko
- Prime Minister: Alexander Zakharchenko
- Preceded by: Igor Strelkov
- Succeeded by: Office abolished

Personal details
- Born: October 14, 1974 (age 51) Hirske, Luhansk Oblast, Ukrainian SSR, Soviet Union
- Nickname: "Tsar" (Царь)

Military service
- Allegiance: Ukraine (until 2014); Donetsk People's Republic (from 2014)
- Rank: Major general
- Battles/wars: War in Donbas

Vladimir Petrovich Kononov (Russian: Владимир Петрович Кононов; born October 14, 1974), also known by his nom de guerre, Tsar, is a former defence minister of the self-proclaimed Donetsk People's Republic, serving from August 15, 2014, after the resignation of Igor Girkin (also known as Igor Strelkov) until October 1, 2018.

Kononov is a Donetsk local. In 2014, he was a lieutenant colonel, and by 2015 was promoted to major general.

== Biography ==
Vladimir Petrovich Kononov was born in 1974 in the city of Hirske, Luhansk Oblast (also known as Gorskoye). He graduated from Sloviansk and the Aviation College of civil aviation in 1995, and from the Slavic State Pedagogical Institute in 1999.

He was professionally engaged in sports and pedagogical activities, and worked as a coach in the Judo Federation of Donetsk region. He has 20 years of coaching experience in judo. He also passed special training for senior commanders.

On April 13, 2014, he volunteered in the people's militia of Donbass, and led the checkpoint in Sloviansk. He commanded the unit in confrontation in battles in Sloviansk, Shakhtorsk, Ilovaysk, Mospino and other settlements. His military rank (as of August 2014) was lieutenant colonel.

After the resignation of Igor Strelkov, he became acting defense minister of the People's Republic of Donetsk. He became defense minister of the Donetsk People's Republic on August 14, 2014. On October 1 2018, the Donetsk People's Republic allegedly abolished the office of defence minister.

He is married and has a child. His younger brother is one of the commanders of the militia of the NDP.

=== Sanctions ===
He was sanctioned by the UK government in 2014 in relation to the Russo-Ukrainian War.
