= Igor Girkin =

Russian intelligence officer and militant leader (born 1970)

- Игорь Гиркин
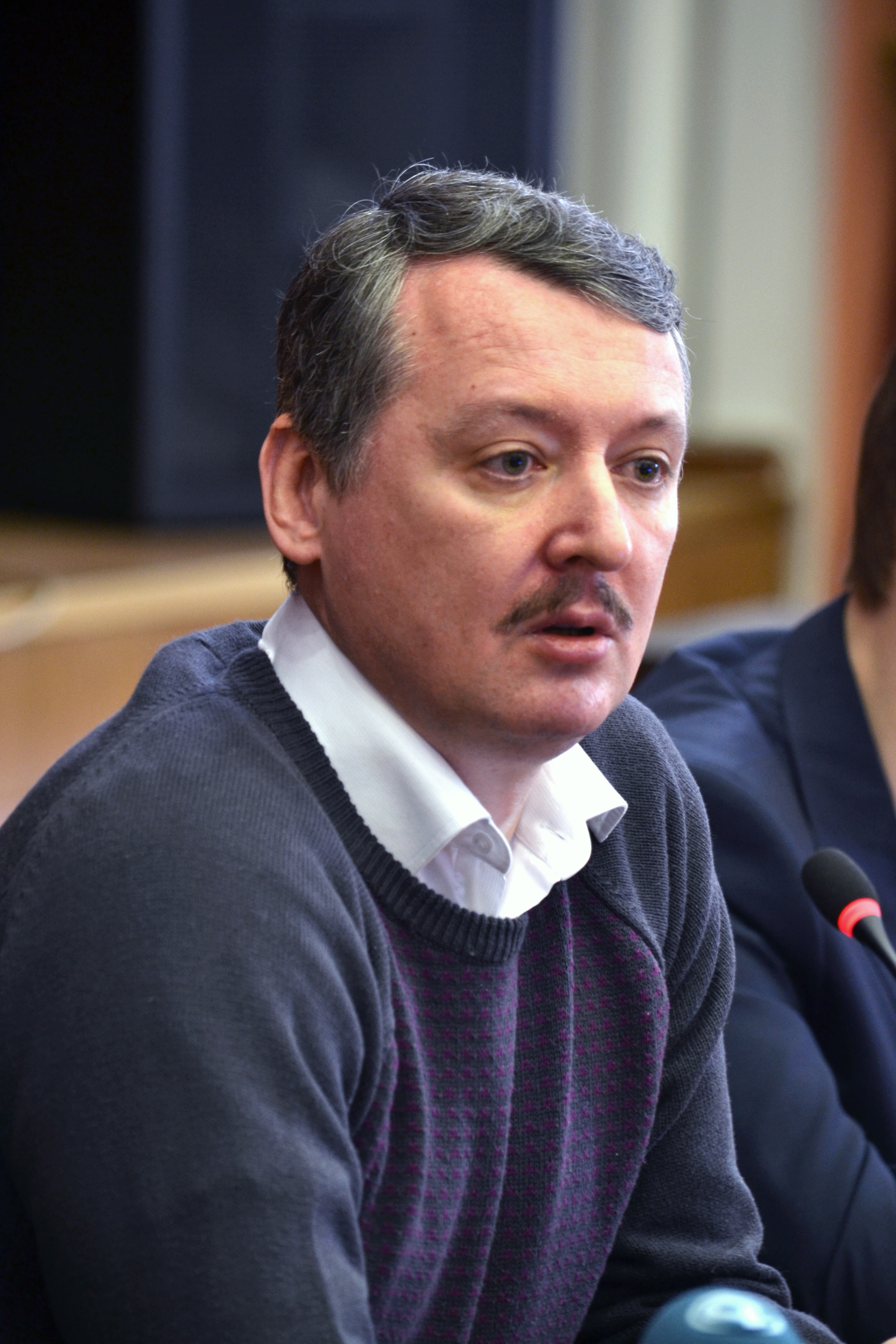
- Girkin in 2015

Minister of Defence of the Donetsk People's Republic
- In office 16 May 2014 – 14 August 2014
- President: Pavel Gubarev
- Prime Minister: Alexander Borodai; Alexander Zakharchenko
- Preceded by: Office established
- Succeeded by: Vladimir Kononov

Personal details
- Born: Igor Vsevolodovich Girkin; 17 December 1970 (age 55) Moscow, Russian SFSR, Soviet Union
- Party: Angry Patriots Club (2023)
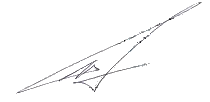
- Signature
- Nickname: Igor Ivanovich Strelkov

Military service
- Allegiance: Russia; Transnistria; Republika Srpska; Donetsk Republic
- Branch/service: Russian Ground Forces; Federal Security Service; Donbas People's Militia
- Rank: Colonel
- Battles/wars: Transnistria War; Bosnian War; Chechen–Russian conflict; First Chechen War; Second Chechen War; Russo-Ukrainian War; Annexation of Crimea by the Russian Federation; 2014 Simferopol incident; War in Donbas (2014–2022); Siege of Sloviansk; Battle of Kramatorsk

Igor Vsevolodovich Girkin (Russian: Игорь Всеволодович Гиркин, IPA: [ˈiɡərʲ ˈfsʲevələdəvʲɪdʑ ˈɡʲirkʲɪn]; (Note: In isolation, Всеволодович is pronounced [ˈfsʲevələdəvʲɪtɕ].) born 17 December 1970), also known by the alias Igor Ivanovich Strelkov (Russian: Игорь Иванович Стрелков, IPA: [ˈiɡərʲ ɪˈvanəvʲɪtɕ strʲɪlˈkof]), is a Russian army veteran and former Federal Security Service (FSB) officer who played a key role in the Russian annexation of Crimea, and then in the Donbas War as an organizer of militant groups in the Donetsk People's Republic (DPR). In 2024 he was convicted on charges of inciting extremism. Earlier he received a life sentence in absentia in the Netherlands for his role in downing the Malaysia Airlines Flight 17.

Girkin admitted responsibility for sparking the Donbas War in eastern Ukraine when, in April 2014, he led a group of armed Russian militants who seized Sloviansk. His role in the siege gained him influence and attention, and he was appointed to the position of Minister of Defense in the Donetsk People's Republic, a puppet state of Russia. Girkin was charged with terrorism by Ukrainian authorities. He has also been sanctioned by the European Union, United States, United Kingdom, Australia, Japan, Canada and Switzerland for his leading role in the war in eastern Ukraine.

Girkin was dismissed from his position in August 2014, after 298 civilians were killed when Malaysia Airlines Flight 17 was shot down by Russian-backed militants. Dutch prosecutors charged Girkin and three others with mass murder, and issued an international arrest warrant against him. Girkin admitted "moral responsibility" but denied pushing the button. On 17 November 2022, Girkin was found guilty for the murder of 298 people, convicted of all charges in absentia, and issued a life sentence.

Girkin is a self-described Russian nationalist. After his service in the war, he returned to Russia in 2014 as a political activist, reportedly calling for the liberal part of the Russian elite to be destroyed, which would shift the power balance in favor of militarists and securocrats.

During the Russian invasion of Ukraine, Girkin regained attention as a milblogger, taking a strong pro-war stance but criticizing the Russian military for what he saw as incompetence and "insufficiency". In October 2022, Girkin briefly joined a volunteer unit fighting against Ukrainian forces. In April 2023, Girkin, alongside some fellow Russian nationalists joined the Club of Angry Patriots, a hardline pro-war group. He began criticizing Vladimir Putin for incompetence and on 21 July 2023 was arrested by Russian authorities on charges of extremism. Girkin was convicted in January 2024 of inciting extremism and sentenced to four years' imprisonment.

== Early life ==
Girkin was born in Moscow, Russia, on 17 December 1970.

According to The New York Times, "his ideological rigidity precedes any connections he has to Russia's security services, stretching back at least to his days at the Moscow State Institute for History and Archives. There, Girkin obsessed over military history and joined a small but vocal group of students who advocated a return to monarchism."

Vice News reported that "during the 1990s, Girkin wrote for the right-wing Russian newspaper Zavtra, which is run by the anti-Semitic Russian nationalist Alexander Prokhanov" and where Alexander Borodai was an editor. Writing for Zavtra ("Tomorrow"), Girkin and Borodai, who too was reported to have fought for Russia-backed Transnistria and Republika Srpska separatists in Moldova and Bosnia and Herzegovina, together covered the Russian war against separatists in Chechnya and Dagestan.

He would also often write as a "Colonel in the Reserves" on Middle East subjects, such as the conflicts in Libya, Egypt and Syria, and for the Abkhazian Network News Agency (ANNA), a Russian-language pro-Russian publication which supports Abkhazian separatism in Georgia.

== FSB service (1996–2003) ==
The Russian media has identified Girkin as an officer of the Russian military reserves who has expressed hardline views on eliminating perceived enemies of the Russian state. He has fought on the federal side in Russian counter-separatist campaigns in Chechnya and on the pro-Moscow separatist side in the conflict in Moldova's breakaway region of Transnistria.

In 1999, he published his memoirs of the fighting in Bosnia and Herzegovina. In 2014, he was accused by Bosnian media (Klix.ba) and a retired Bosnian Army officer of having been involved in the Višegrad massacres in which thousands of civilians were killed in 1992.

The BBC reported Girkin may have worked for Russia's Federal Security Service (FSB) in a counter-terrorism unit, citing Russian military experts. According to Russian media, he has served as an FSB officer and his last role before retirement was reportedly with the FSB's Directorate for Combating International Terrorism.

In 2014 Anonymous International disclosed what it said were Girkin's personal emails, revealing that he had served in the FSB for 18 years from 1996 to March 2013, including in Chechnya from 1999 to 2005, The Moscow Times reported. The newspaper also said Girkin was born in Moscow and that it contacted him by email and phone but that he would not confirm the claims. A local pro-Russia militia leader in Ukraine, Vyacheslav Ponomarev, a self-described old friend of Girkin's, said the information about Girkin was true. His pseudonym "Strelkov" ("Strelok") can be roughly translated as "Rifleman" or "Shooter". He has also been dubbed Igor Groznyy ("Igor the Terrible").

=== Chechen Wars ===
Alexander Cherkasov, head of Russia's leading human rights group Memorial, is convinced that the "Igor Strelkov" involved in Ukraine is the same person as a Russian military officer called "Strelkov", who was identified as being directly responsible for at least six instances (on four occasions) of the forced disappearance and presumed murder of residents of Chechnya's mountain Vedensky District village of Khatuni and nearby settlements of Makhkety and Tevzeni in 2001–2002, when "Strelkov" was attached to the 45th Detached Reconnaissance Regiment special forces unit of the Russian Airborne Troops based near Khatuni.

None of these crimes were solved by official investigations. The website of Chechnya's official human rights ombudsman lists several residents of Khatuni who went missing in 2001 (Beslan Durtayev and Supyan Tashayev) as having been kidnapped from their homes and taken to the 45th DRR base by the officers known as "Colonel Proskuryn and Strelkov Igor". Another entry lists the missing person Beslan Taramov as abducted in 2001 in the village of Elistandzhi by the 45th DRR servicemen led by "Igor Strelko (nicknamed Strikal)".

Cherkasov also lists Durtayev and Tashayev (but not Taramov) among the alleged victims of "Strelkov". Cherkasov and other observers suspected it was in fact the same "Strelkov" until May 2014, when Girkin himself confirmed he has been present at Khatuni in 2001, where he fought against the "local population".

According to Cherkasov, as a result of Girkin's actions in Chechnya, two sisters of one of those "disappeared", Uvais Nagayev, (Note: Uvais Nagayev was a resident of Tevzani who was originally detained by the troops of the 45th DRR on 27 April 2001. After surviving a summary execution that killed Zaur Dagayev (Nagayev was wounded and pretended to be dead), Nagayev was again detained by a group of federal servicemen including Girkin and then held for ransom before being transported to Khankala military base and vanishing without a trace. According to an FSB-connected mediator, Nagayev had been tortured into confessing to unspecified crimes before he was executed and his body was destroyed with explosives.) in effect turned to terrorism and died three years later: one of these sisters, Aminat Nagayeva, blew herself up in the 2004 Russian aircraft bombings over Tula Oblast aboard a Tu-134 "Volga-Aeroexpress" airliner, killing 43. The other sister, Rosa Nagayeva, participated in the Beslan hostage crisis that same year.

The emails leaked in May 2014 and allegedly authored by Girkin contain his diaries from Bosnia and Chechnya that he sent to his friends for review. One story describes an operation of capturing Chechen activists from a village of Mesker-Yurt. Asked by one of friends why he didn't publish them, Girkin explained that "people we captured and questioned almost always disappeared without trace, without court, after we were done" and this is why these stories cannot be openly published.

== Annexation of Crimea and Donbas War (2014) ==
Following the February 2014 Ukrainian revolution, there were pro-Russian, counter-revolutionary demonstrations in southeastern Ukraine.

=== Crimea ===
After 16 years with the FSB, Girkin found employment as head of security for Russian businessman Konstantin Malofeev, nicknamed “the Orthodox oligarch” for his close ties to the Russian Orthodox Church and the Kremlin. In January 2014, Girkin traveled to Kiev, where he was responsible for the security of a tour of religious relics to the Kiev Cave Monastery. The relics were part of the Gifts of the Magi and were exhibited in Russia, Belarus, and Ukraine. During his stay, he visited the Euromaidan and, after talking to local people, became convinced that the protests would be successful and that Ukraine would fall apart in the near future.

The relic tour moved on to Crimea at the end of January, where Malofeev met with the speaker of the Crimean parliament, Vladimir Konstantinov, and discussed with him whether he would be prepared to take “more drastic action” in asserting Crimea’s autonomy should Kyiv descend into complete mayhem. After further meetings between Malofeev and local politicians Sergei Aksyonov and Rustam Temirgaliev, Malofeev and Girkin returned to Moscow. In the first half of February, the Kremlin received a strategy paper that was published a year later by the Russian newspaper Novaya Gazeta. The paper stated that the government of President Viktor Yanukovych was “totally bankrupt” and without any future. The report proposed supporting separatist movements in southeastern Ukraine, focusing on Crimea and the Kharkiv region. The Kremlin and Malofeev denied any connection to this paper.

On Malofeev's recommendation, Girkin was invited back to Crimea at the end of February by Sergei Aksyonov, a member of the Parliament of the Autonomous Republic of Crimea and later Prime Minister of Crimea, to serve as his “security advisor,” who put him in charge of his militias. The official commander of the militias was Aksyonov's close associate Mikhail Sheremet, but Girkin was responsible for the operational control of some units and their coordination with Russian security forces. According to reports, he introduced himself to local militiamen as an “emissary of the Kremlin”.

I was in charge of the only unit of Crimean militia, the spetsnaz company which carried out combat missions. But after the combat for cartography base when 2 people died (I was that battle's commander), the company was disbanded and its members parted.

— Igor Girkin, Newspaper "Zavtra", 20 November 2014

On the morning of February 27, militias occupied the Building of the Supreme Council of Crimea in Simferopol. Girkin ordered the militias to round up local lawmakers and forced them to call an extraordinary session in which they voted for Sergei Aksyonov as the new local prime minister. He founded the political party Russian Unity that received just 4 per cent of the votes in the last elections. Girkin’s men forced a vote for a referendum on the separation of Crimea from Ukraine on 25 May. Girkin admitted more than a year later on Russian television, that most of the peninsula’s government officials were against the move. “I did not see any support from the [Crimean] authorities in Simferopol where I was,” he confessed. “It was militants who collected deputies and forced them to vote. Yes, I was one of the commanders of those militants.” He was also reported to be instrumental in negotiating the 2014 defection of the Ukrainian Navy commander Denis Berezovsky.

Girkin's unit was also involved in the 2014 Simferopol incident, the only direct violent confrontation with the Ukrainian military. The incident took place on March 18 at the Cartography Center in Simferopol and resulted in the death of a Ukrainian soldier. According to another report, two people were killed in this incident. Girkin was later accused by the Crimean authorities of negligence for his role in the violent storming of the base. This led to the disarmament and disbandment of Girkin's unit.

=== Sloviansk ===
I pressed the launching trigger of war. If our squad did not cross the border, at the end all would have been finished as in Kharkiv or Odesa. Practically, the flywheel of war which lasts until now was launched by our squad. And I bear a personal responsibility for what is happening there.

— Igor Girkin, Newspaper "Zavtra", 20 November 2014

==== Pro-Russian capture of Sloviansk ====
Girkin said that the head of the newly installed Russian government in Crimea, Sergei Aksyonov, asked him to deal with the Donbas provinces of eastern Ukraine.

On 12 April 2014, Girkin led a fifty-strong unit of heavily armed Russian militants who captured the strategic town of Sloviansk in eastern Ukraine. They attacked and occupied the town's administration building, police station, and Security Service building, and set up roadblocks. The unit were mostly Russian Armed Forces 'volunteers' from Russian-occupied Crimea and wore no insignia. The following morning, Girkin’s group set up an ambush for Ukrainian special forces near Sloviansk. During the ambush, Hennadiy Bilichenko, an officer with the Ukrainian Security Service of Ukraine (SBU), was killed, and three other members of the security forces were wounded. Bilichenko was the first combat victim of the war. Girkin later stated that he had “minced” Bilichenko. He also admitted that this action sparked the Donbas War. He said "I'm the one who pulled the trigger of war. If our unit hadn't crossed the border, everything would have fizzled out, like in [the Ukrainian city of] Kharkiv, like in Odessa". He said his unit was formed in Crimea and consisted of volunteers from Russia, Crimea, and other regions of Ukraine. Girkin claimed many of the militants had Ukrainian citizenship and had fought in the Russian Armed Forces in Chechnya and Central Asia, while others had fought in Iraq and Yugoslavia with the Ukrainian Armed Forces. Girkin said he was ordered not to give up Sloviansk.

On 15 April 2014, the SBU opened a criminal proceeding against "Igor Strelkov" for his actions in Sloviansk and Crimea, describing him as the chief organizer of the "terror" in Sloviansk Raion, including an ambush that killed one and wounded three SBU officers.

On 16 April, he allegedly sought to recruit Ukrainian soldiers captured at the entrance to Kramatorsk.

The SBU presented Girkin's presence in eastern Ukraine as proof of Russia's involvement in the Donbas War. They released intercepted telephone conversations between "Strelkov" and his supposed handlers in Moscow. Russia denied any interference in Ukraine by its troops outside Crimea.

In July 2014, Ukrainian authorities alleged that Russian Defense Minister Sergei Shoigu coordinated all of Girkin's actions, supplying him and "other terrorist leaders" with "the most destructive weapons" since May and instructing him directly, with Russian President Vladimir Putin's approval.

==== Involvement in kidnapping and murder ====
Ukrainian government claims Girkin was behind the 17 April 2014 kidnapping, torture and murder of a local Ukrainian politician Volodymyr Rybak and a 19-year-old college student Yury Popravko. Rybak's abduction by a group of men in Horlivka was recorded on camera. The SBU released portions of intercepted calls in which another Russian citizen, alleged GRU officer and Girkin's subordinate Igor Bezler orders Rybak to be "neutralized", and a subsequent conversation in which "Strelkov" is heard instructing Ponomarev to dispose of Rybak's body, which is "lying here [in the basement of the separatist headquarters in Sloviansk] and beginning to smell."

Rybak's corpse with a smashed head, multiple stab wounds and ripped stomach was found later in April in a river near Sloviansk. Popravko's body was found nearby. Ukrainian Interior Minister Arsen Avakov described Girkin as "a monster and a killer". The incident helped prompt the government's "anti-terrorist" military offensive against the pro-Russia separatists in Ukraine.

In an interview with "Radio-KP" on 18 January 2016, Girkin acknowledged that he used extrajudicial punishment, and at least four people were executed by firing squad while he was in Sloviansk. In May 2020 Girkin confessed in an interview with Ukrainian journalist Dmitry Gordon that he ordered the killing of Popravko and another man: "Yes, these people were shot on my orders. No one ripped open their stomach. Do I regret that they were shot? No, they were enemies." Girkin also stated that the killing of Rybak was also to some extent under his responsibility.

==== Supreme Commander of the Donetsk People's Republic ====
I absolutely do not worry about international law, because it is a tool at the hands of victors. If we are defeated, then it means that the norms of the law will be used against me.

— Igor Strelkov, "Radio-KP", 18 January 2016

During the weekend of 26–27 April 2014, the political leader of the separatist-controlled Donetsk People's Republic (DPR), Girkin's long-time friend, Alexander Borodai, also a Russian national from Moscow, ceded control of all separatist fighters in the entire Donetsk region to him. On 26 April, "Strelkov" made his first public appearance when he gave a video interview to Komsomolskaya Pravda where he confirmed that his militia in Sloviansk came from Crimea.

He said nothing about his own background, denied receiving weapons or ammunition from Russia, and announced that his militia would not release the Organization for Security and Co-operation in Europe (OSCE) observers that it had taken hostage unless pro-Russia activists were first freed by the Ukrainian government. On 28 April, the EU sanctioned "Igor Strelkov" as a GRU staff member believed to be a coordinator of armed actions and a security assistant to Crimea's Sergey Aksyonov. He was also sanctioned by the United Kingdom on 29 April.

On 29 April, Girkin appointed a new police chief for Kramatorsk. On 12 May, "I. Strelkov" declared himself "the Supreme Commander of the DPR" and all of its "military units, security, police, customs, border guards, prosecutors, and other paramilitary structures".

According to a report issued by the Office of the United Nations High Commissioner for Human Rights, "reportedly, on 26 May, by order of Strelkov, Dmytro Slavov ('commander of a company of the people's militia') and Mykola Lukyanov ('commander of a platoon of the militia of Donetsk People's Republic') were "executed" in Sloviansk, after they were "sentenced" for "looting, armed robbery, kidnapping and abandoning the battle field". The order, which was circulated widely and posted in the streets in Slovyansk, referred to a decree of the Presidium of the Supreme Council of the USSR of 22 June 1941 as the basis for the execution."

The report also mentions Girkin's efforts to recruit local women into his armed formations: "A particular call for women to join the armed groups was made on 17 May through a video released with Girkin "Strelkov", urging women of the Donetsk region to enlist in combat units." Sloviansk's separatist "people's mayor" and former boss of Girkin, Ponomarev, was himself detained on an order of Girkin on 10 June for "engaging in activities incompatible with the goals and tasks of the civil administration".

==== Retreat from Sloviansk to Donetsk ====
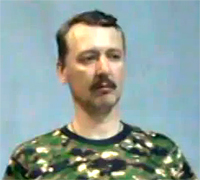
Girkin in an interview in July 2014

On the night of 4–5 July 2014, during a large-scale offensive by the Ukrainian military, following the end of a 10-day ceasefire on 30 June, Girkin led the Sloviansk People's Militia to an orderly retreat out of Ukrainian encirclement and made it to Donetsk, which they started fortifying on 7 July. Sloviansk was then captured by Ukrainian forces, thus ending the separatist occupation of the city which had started on 6 April. According to Girkin, 80–90 percent of his men had escaped from Sloviansk.

The ultimately successful withdrawal of a considerable force of separatists from the besieged Sloviansk to the large industrial center of Donetsk caused some backlash in Ukraine against the army leadership. General Mykhailo Zabrodskyi, then the commander of the besieging army who was criticized for having allowed Girkin's columns to move out of the city unopposed (and as of 2023 the Deputy Chief of the General Staff of the Ukrainian Armed Forces), said in 2020 that Girkin's successful escape had longtime consequences for the war, unfavorable for Ukraine:

The feeling of annoyance that if they [the separatists] had been done away with in Sloviansk, then, perhaps, events would have developed completely differently, for example, in Donetsk. Because now we know that everything that happened in Donetsk received a completely new impetus after the arrival of a group of militants there together with Girkin. There was a rather unique chance to complete the anti-terrorist operation then [in Sloviansk] once and for all. That chance was lost.

General Serhiy Krivonos, Deputy Secretary of the National Security and Defense Council of Ukraine, said in 2020 that the Ukrainian Army was aware of the movement of Girkin's columns out of Sloviansk but did not attack the columms:

Having some information from our sources from Sloviansk and Kramatorsk, we understood that they [the separatists] would come out. This understanding was clearly formed between July 2 and 3. And already on the 4th it was clear that they would leave that night from 4 to 5 July. We actively conducted reconnaissance and gave coordinates directly on the night movement of the column, and on the daytime location of the enemy in Kramatorsk, and then on the exit of Girkin's columns from Kramatorsk. These coordinates were given. There was no implementation of [an attack on] these coordinates.

On 11 July spokesman for the National Security and Defense Council of Ukraine Andriy Lysenko claimed Ukrainian security forces had not destroyed the retreating military column because they had received information that the separatists were using human shields.

Shortly before the withdrawal, a video was posted on YouTube in which Girkin desperately pleaded for military aid from Russia for "Novorossiya" ("New Russia", an historical name for South-East Ukraine with particular popularity amongst separatists) and said Sloviansk "will fall earlier than the rest".

Other rebel leaders denied Girkin's assessment that the people's militia were on the verge of collapse, implying that his seemingly desperate message was a deliberate act of maskirovka. One of them, the self-proclaimed "people's governor" of Donetsk Pavel Gubarev, compared Girkin to the 19th century Russian general Mikhail Kutuzov, claiming that both "Strelkov" and Kutuzov would "depart only before a decisive, victorious battle". Others compared Girkin's orderly withdrawal from Sloviansk which allowed the separatists to strengthen their presence in Donetsk to Voroshilov's and the Fifth Red Army's fighting retreat from Luhansk in spring 1918 (during the Russian Civil War), which allowed the army to escape German encirclement and prepare the successful defense of Tsaritsyn.

His retreat was strongly criticized by the Russian nationalist Sergey Kurginyan. A rumor inside Russian ultranationalist circles alleged Russia's powerful "grey cardinal" figure Vladislav Surkov conspired with east Ukrainian oligarch Rinat Akhmetov to organize a campaign against "Strelkov" as well as against the Eurasianism ideologue Alexander Dugin. Kurginyan accused Girkin of surrendering Sloviansk and not keeping his oath to die in Sloviansk.

Kurginyan believes that surrendering Sloviansk is a war crime, and Girkin should be responsible for that. The DPR security minister Alexander Khodakovsky, who defected from the SBU Alpha Group and who commanded the rebel Vostok Battalion, also protested and threatened a mutiny.

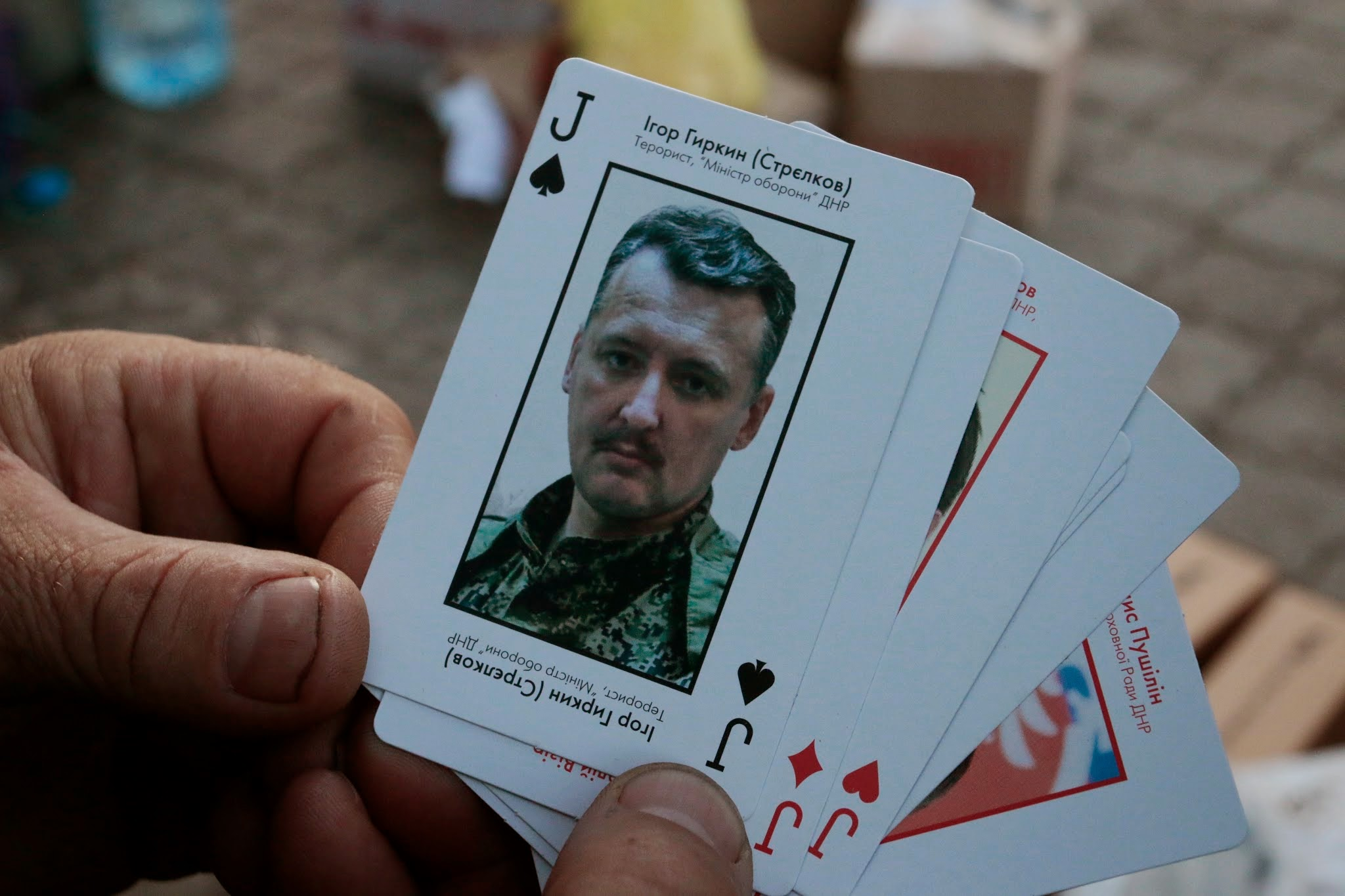
Personality Identification Playing Card of Igor "Strelkov"

On 10 July 2014, news outlet Mashable reported finding execution orders three days earlier for Slavov and Lukyanov in Girkin's abandoned Sloviansk headquarters. The orders were signed "Strelkov" with the name Girkin Igor Vsevolodovich printed underneath. Also sentenced to death was Alexei Pichko, a civilian who was caught stealing two shirts and a pair of pants from an abandoned house of his neighbour. According to an unconfirmed story, his body "had been dumped on the front lines" after he was executed.

On 24 July, Ukrainian authorities exhumed several corpses from a mass grave site on the grounds of a children's hospital near the Jewish cemetery in Slovyansk, which might contain as many as 20 bodies of those executed by order of Girkin. Among the identified victims were four Ukrainian Protestants who the police and locals said had been kidnapped on 8 June, after attending a service at their church. They were falsely accused of helping the Ukrainian Army, robbed for their cars, and shot the following day.

=== Malaysia Airlines Flight 17 ===
Multiple sources cited a post on the VKontakte social networking service that was made by an account under Girkin's name which acknowledged shooting down an aircraft at approximately the same time that the civilian airliner Malaysia Airlines Flight 17 (MH17) was reported to have crashed in eastern Ukraine in the same area near the Russian border on 17 July 2014. The post specifically referenced how warnings were issued for planes not to fly in their airspace and the downing of a Ukrainian military Antonov An-26 transport plane which the Ukraine Crisis Media Center suggested was a case of misidentification with the MH17.

This post was deleted later in the day and the account behind it claimed that Girkin has no official account on this social service. Most of the 298 victims in the plane's crash came from the Netherlands. On 19 July the country's biggest newspaper De Telegraaf included Girkin's photo in the front page collage of pro-Russian rebel leaders under the one-word headline "Murderers" ("Moordenaars"). Russian opposition lawyer and politician Mark Feygin posted a purported order by Girkin where he instructs all his men and commanders who "have in their possession personal effects from this plane" to deliver the found items to his HQ so "the valuables (watches, earrings, pendants, and other jewelry and items from valuable metals)" would be transferred to "the Defense Fund of the DPR."

Girkin was the author of an alternative version of the incident, wherein "no living people were aboard the plane as it flew on autopilot from Amsterdam, where it had been loaded with "rotting corpses"." This lie was then "not only aired on all state-controlled media outlets, but was the subject of serious discussion." At his press-conference on 28 July 2014, Girkin denied his connection to the downed plane and announced that his militants were killing "black-skinned" mercenaries.

==== Charges and trial in absentia ====
In July 2015 a writ was filed in an American court by families of 18 victims formally accusing Girkin of "orchestrating the shootdown". The writ claimed damages of US$900 million and was brought under the Torture Victim Protection Act of 1991.

On 19 June 2019, the Dutch-led Joint Investigation Team (JIT), investigating the shooting down of MH17, officially announced a criminal case against Girkin and three other men. The court proceedings were scheduled to start on 9 March 2020 before the District Court of The Hague, at the Schiphol Judicial Complex The JIT said it would ask Russia to extradite the suspects who are currently on Russian soil, saying: "The criminal trial will take place even if the suspects choose not to appear in court." Interfax news agency quoted Girkin as saying: "I do not give any comments. The only thing I can say is the rebels did not shoot down the Boeing."

On 17 November 2022, following a trial in absentia in the Netherlands, Girkin, along with another Russian and a Ukrainian, was found guilty of murdering all 298 people on board flight MH17 by participating in shooting it down. The Dutch court also ruled that Russia was in control of the separatist forces fighting in eastern Ukraine at the time.

Following the verdict, Girkin told Steve Rosenberg, Russia editor for the British Broadcasting Corporation, that "I do not recognise the authority of the Dutch court on this matter. I am a military man and I am not going to accept that a civilian court in a foreign country has the authority to convict a person who took part in someone else's civil war".

=== Planning of the Ilovaisk operation ===
After arriving in Donetsk, Girkin organized the fortification of the city and, as Defense Minister of the DPR, oversaw the planning of the operation that repulsed further Ukrainian advances into the Donbas and later resulted in the encirclement and destruction of the Ukrainian Army's Southern grouping in the Battle of Ilovaisk in late August. After Ukraine had captured Sloviansk and Kramatorsk, the Ukrainian Army's offensive strategy involved the Ukrainian forces slicing through the LPR and DPR defenses, splitting them from each other (along the Svitlodarsk-Debaltseve arc), piercing through to the Russia–Ukraine border, and surging along the borders, cutting off Donbas from Russia. The plan resulted in a devastating defeat of the Ukrainian grouping and set the stage for the DPR-LPR counter-offensive in the second half of August, creating multiple cauldrons which destroyed several Ukrainian battalions and pushed the Ukrainian Army back.

While Girkin started the campaign, others took the plan to fruition after his dismissal in mid-August, and brought it to a tangible victory over the Ukrainian Army (a victory that, in turn, led to the Minsk I and Minsk II accords). These rebel commanders included Alexander Zakharchenko and Alexander Khodakovsky, as well as Girkin's deputies, such as Arsen Pavlov ("Motorola") and Mikhail Tolstykh ("Givi"). Later, Ukraine's Security Service (SBU) claimed that the Chief of the General Staff of the Russian Federation, General Valery Gerasimov, was in personal command of the Ilovaisk operation.

=== Dismissal as Donetsk People's Republic minister ===
According to ITAR-TASS news agency on Wednesday, 13 August 2014, Girkin was seriously wounded the previous day in fierce fighting in the pro-Russian rebel held territories of Eastern Ukraine, and was described to be in "grave" condition. DNS representative Sergei Kavtaradze refuted this news shortly after, saying Girkin is "alive and well".

On 14 August the leadership of the DNR announced that Girkin was dismissed from his position of defense minister "on his own request" as he was assigned "some other tasks". On 16 August the Russian TV-Zvezda claimed that Girkin was "on vacation". It claimed that he was appointed as a military chief of the combined forces of Luhansk and Donetsk (he had been in command of Donetsk forces only) and after he returns he will be put to a task of creating an unified command over the forces of the Federal State of Novorossiya. According to Stanislav Belkovskiy, the main reason for the removal of Girkin from the "defense minister" position was the amount of attention caused by the downing of MH17 and the negative impact on Russia's actions in Ukraine that it caused.

On 22 August a former rebel Anton Raevsky ("Nemetz") said in an interview in Rostov-on-Don that Girkin and his supporters are being cleansed from the DNR by the FSB, because of this insufficient compliance with Kremlin's policy on the republic. According to the Nemtsov Report, Girkin later acknowledged that he resigned from his official position in the DNR due to pressure from the Kremlin.

In November 2014 in an interview for "Moscow Speaking" radio, Girkin said that "the existence of Luhansk and Donetsk People's Republics in their current form, with the low-profile but still bloody war, is definitely convenient for USA in the first place, and only for them, because they are the ulcer that divides Russia and Ukraine". Later in November in an interview for Zavtra newspaper Girkin stated that the war in Donbas was launched by his detachment despite both Ukrainian government and local combatants having avoided an armed confrontation before. Also he recognized himself responsible for the actual situation in Donetsk and other cities of the region.

== Civilian life in Russia (2014–2022) ==
In late April 2014, "Strelkov" was identified by Ukrainian intelligence as Colonel Igor Girkin, registered as a resident of Moscow. Journalists visiting the apartment where he allegedly lived with his former wife and two sons, as well as his mother and sister. talked to neighbors who described Girkin as "polite" and quiet.

Girkin claims that he worked as a security chief for the controversial Russian businessmen Konstantin Malofeev. The Prime Minister of the self-proclaimed Donetsk Republic Alexander Borodai was also a close associate of the businessman.

According to the 2022 Bellingcat investigation, Girkin was using a Russian internal passport issued in the fictional name of Sergey Viktorovich Runov. Runov was the surname of his maternal grandfather, as well as the maiden name of his mother (as Runova). Passports from the same series have been used by several FSB operatives, including Zelimkhan Khangoshvili murderer Vadim Krasikov and members of the FSB squad involved in the poisoning of Alexei Navalny.

Andrey Piontkovsky adduces Girkin's name among those of like-minded persons and says, "The authentic high-principled Hitlerites, true Aryans Dugin, Prokhanov, Prosvirin, Kholmogorov, Girkin, Prilepin are a marginalized minority in Russia." Piontkovsky adds, "Putin has stolen the ideology of the Russian Reich from the domestic Hitlerites, he has preventively burned them down, using their help to do so, hundreds of their most active supporters in the furnace of the Ukrainian Vendée." In his interview with Radio Liberty, Piontkovsky says, maybe the meaning of the operation conducted by Putin is to reveal all these potential passionate leaders of social revolt, send them to Ukraine and burn them in the furnace of the Ukrainian Vendée.

In his interview with Oleksandr Chalenko on 2 December 2014, according to the journalist, Girkin confirmed that he is an FSB colonel, but this claim was then subjected to censorship and omitted from publishing. He also acknowledged that anarchy exists among the so-called Novorossiya militants. He stated that Igor Bezler's militants in particular acted independently, the so-called "Russian Orthodox Army" had split in half, and other forces represented a patchwork of various unrelated groups. Girkin criticised the ongoing attacks on the Donetsk International Airport as pointless and harmful.

After Luhansk commander Alexander "Batman" Bednov was killed by other militants in January 2015, Girkin criticised the killing as a "murder" and "gangster ambush", and suggested that other commanders seriously consider leaving Donbas to Russia, as he did. In a January 2015 interview for Anna News, Girkin said that in his opinion "Russia is currently at state of war", since the volunteers who arrive to Donbas "are being supplied with arms and shells". He also noted that "he never separated Ukraine from Soviet Union in his mind" so he considers the conflict as a "civil war in Russia".

In March 2016 Girkin's appearance as a panelist on a Moscow Economic Forum (MEF) along with Oleg Tsarev and Pavel Gubarev attracted critical reactions in Russia, with Yaroslav Grekov from Ekho Moskvy accusing MEF organizers of "promoting terrorism".

In May 2016, Girkin announced the creation of the Russian National Movement, a neo-imperialist political party. The party is in favor of "uniting the Russian Federation, Ukraine, Belarus, and other Russian lands into a single all-Russian state and transforming the entire territory of the former USSR into an unconditional zone of Russian influence." Girkin said "the Russian National Movement fully rejects President Vladimir Putin's regime and calls for an end to the current climate of fear and intimidation of Russia's citizens". The party has called for "strict quota system for migrant workers from the former Soviet republics in Central Asia and the Caucasus" and the cancelling of laws on internet control.

== Russian invasion of Ukraine ==
With the Russian invasion of Ukraine on late February, Girkin became again a public figure, covering the war though his warblog on Telegram. Girkin has a pro-war position, but has been noted for criticisms directed against the Russian military and the Ministry of Defence, including the defense minister Sergei Shoigu, in how the invasion has been unsuccessful, inefficient and insufficient. Ultra-nationalists and pro-war activists such as Girkin, once seen as untouchable, benefited from protection provided by high-ranking officials within the military and intelligence services, contrasting with the liberal, pro-democracy opposition to Vladimir Putin and independent journalists who have faced persecution since February 2022 for criticizing the war in Ukraine and the Kremlin. Bellingcat journalist Christo Grozev believes Girkin was shielded from being censored by a "war party" inside the FSB.

Due the initial failures of the Russian invasion, Girkin called on 29 March for a general mobilization. On 21 April Girkin raised the opinion that "without at least a partial mobilization in the Russian Federation, it will be impossible and highly dangerous to launch a deep strategic offensive against the so-called Ukraine".

On 15 August, Girkin was reportedly detained in Crimea while attempting to travel to the frontline near Kherson.

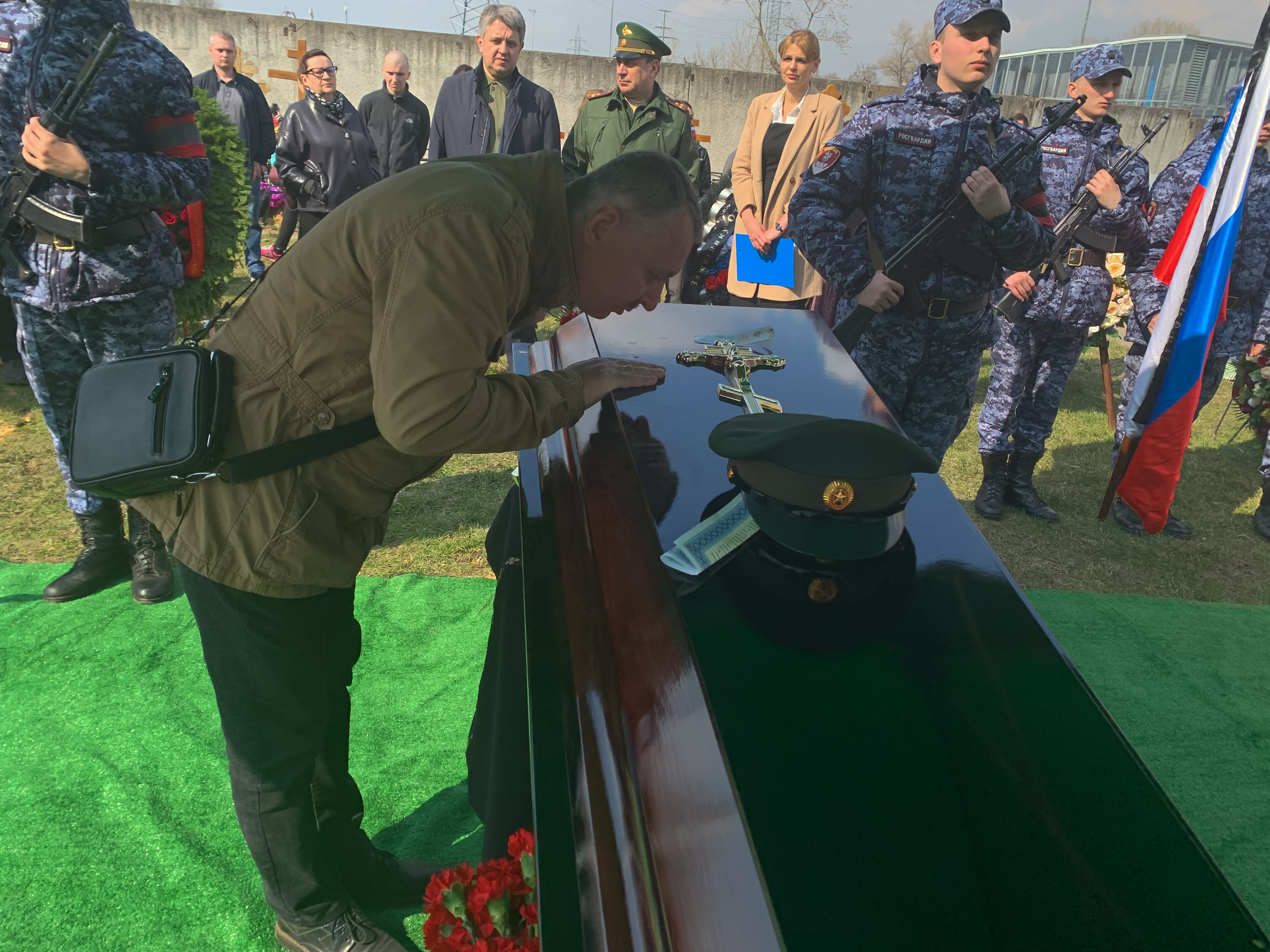
Girkin in April 2023 at the funeral of a Russian volunteer and ex-Russian Wikipedia editor, Vadim Sokolov.

After large Ukrainian conteroffensives in September 2022, he predicted a complete defeat for Russian troops in Ukraine. He said that full mobilization in Russia was the "last chance" for victory. On 12 September, he called the Russian attacks on Ukrainian power plants "very useful". He also said that Defense Minister Sergei Shoigu should be executed by firing squad and called for the use of tactical nuclear weapons in order "to drive 20 million refugees to Europe."

In early October 2022 Girkin left for Ukraine in order to fight in one of the Russian volunteer units. That same month, it was reported that the Ukrainian government crowdfunded a US$150,000 reward for his capture. In December 2022, he wrote about his experience: "Simply put, the troops are fighting by inertia, not having the slightest idea of the ultimate strategic goals of the military campaign. In most parts of the RF [Russian Federation] Armed Forces, soldiers and officers do not understand: In the name of what, for what, and with what purposes they are fighting. It's a mystery for them: What is the condition for victory or just a condition for ending the war."

In April 2023, Girkin, alongside fellow Russian nationalists Pavel Gubarev and Maxim Kalashnikov, formed the Club of Angry Patriots, a hardline Russian nationalist group aiming to lobby Russian government to take more serious approach to win the war in Ukraine by declaring total military mobilization and alarming it on possible pro-western coup in Russia.

On 27 May 2023, Girkin accused Yevgeny Prigozhin of plotting to use the Wagner Group to stage a coup within Russia and that Prigozhin was actively violating Russian 2022 war censorship laws by complaining about the Russian high command. About a month later, Prigozhin and the Wagner Group would rebel against the central government after tensions escalated between Prigozhin and the Ministry of Defense establishment.

=== Feud with Prigozhin ===
Girkin has made various critical comments about Yevgeny Prigozhin, founder of the Wagner Group. In an interview with "National Service News" (NSN) in January 2023, he criticized the leadership of the PMC Wagner for "wasting excellent assault infantry in frontal attacks in the most mediocre way", and made several attacks on Prigozhin, noting that he "should not be allowed into public space because of his background as a criminal". Responding to these attacks, Prigozhin invited Girkin to join the ranks of the Wagner PMC at that time fighting in Ukraine. After Girkin declined, Prigozhin accused him of having made a secret deal in 2014 with Ukrainian oligarch Rinat Akhmetov to surrender Sloviansk to Ukraine in exchange for money and safe passage to Donetsk. In turn, Girkin accused the leadership of PMC Wagner of having carried out the murder of LPR commander Aleksey Mozgovoy in May 2015 on behalf of the Russian government.

=== Criticism of Putin ===
After returning from the Donbass to Russia in late 2014, he started criticizing members of Putin's inner circle, namely Vladislav Surkov and Sergei Shoigu, for having betrayed the people of the Donbass, but for a time he abstained from criticizing Putin in person.

On 21 February 2023, Girkin criticized Putin's speech to the Russian public, saying "Not a word about failures and defeats. Blah blah blah, there's no point in listening anymore...another chance to prevent turmoil has been missed."

On 25 June 2023, he said that if Putin "is not ready to take the leadership over the creation of war-ready conditions" in Russia, "then he really needs to transfer the powers, but legally, to someone who is capable of such hard work."

On 18 July 2023, Girkin urged Putin to transfer power "to someone truly capable and responsible", saying that "For 23 years, the country was led by a lowlife who managed to 'blow dust in the eyes' of a significant part of the population. Now he is the last island of legitimacy and stability of the state. But the country will not survive another six years of this cowardly mediocrity in power." Girkin said that "A lot of empty talk, the minimum of action and the utter lack of responsibility for failures — that is Putin's style of late."

In January 2026, Girkin voiced harsh criticism of the Kremlin following a successful U.S. military operation in Venezuela. His comments reflect a growing sentiment among Russian "Z-bloggers" that Moscow's international prestige has suffered a significant blow. He argued that Russia is so deeply "bogged down up to our ears in the bloody swamp of Ukraine" that it is effectively incapable of assisting its allies elsewhere. He framed the loss of Venezuela as a major reputational disaster for Russia, occurring shortly after the fall of Bashar al-Assad in Syria. Girkin expressed a "grudging respect" for the U.S. operation, stating it demonstrated "how a great power should act" when responding to emerging threats before they become insurmountable.

=== Arrest and imprisonment ===
On 21 July 2023, Girkin was arrested by Russian authorities on charges of extremism, reportedly stemming from a complaint filed by a former employee of PMC Wagner. He had previously launched several attacks on Vladimir Putin's handling of the war in Ukraine, calling him a "cowardly waste of space" and "a non-entity" and called on him to resign the presidency.

In November 2023, Girkin announced his intention to run as a candidate in the 2024 Russian presidential election, describing elections in Russia as a "sham" in which "the only winner [referring to Putin] is known in advance". On 24 December 2023, hundreds of people gathered for a demonstration in Moscow in which they expressed their support for Girkin's candidacy.

Girkin appeared in court in Moscow in 2024 on charges of inciting extremism. He was convicted of the charges on 25 January, and was sentenced to imprisonment in a penal colony for four years. When the verdict was read out, Girkin reportedly shouted "I serve the Fatherland!". Girkin's lawyer said the verdict was "an ugly judicial act" and would be appealed "immediately". The court heard Girkin's appeal and upheld his sentence in May 2024. The cassation appeal heard before the Supreme Court of Russia on 6 November 2024 was not upheld and the previous court rulings were left unchanged.

== Personal life ==
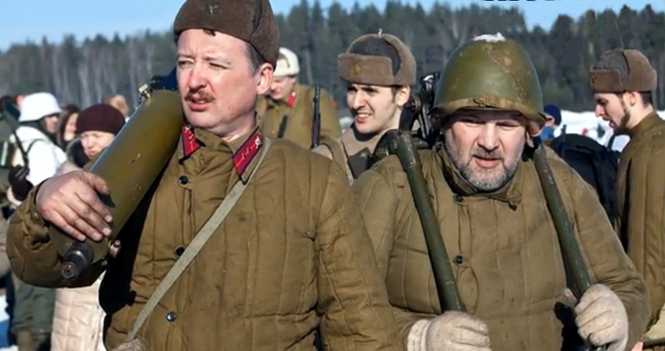
Girkin (left) during a military reenactment

Girkin is a fan of military-historical reenactment and has participated in several reenactments related to various periods of Russian and international history, such as the Russian Civil War where he would play a White movement officer. His personal role model is said to be the White Guard general Mikhail Drozdovsky, killed in a battle with the Red Army in 1919.

Girkin was married to Miroslava Reginskaya in 2014, with whom he had a daughter.
