= Kursk campaign order of battle =

This is the order of battle for the Kursk campaign of the Russo-Ukrainian War.

== Order of battle ==
=== Russian forces and allies ===
==== Kursk region ====
- Russian Armed Forces
  - Russian Ground Forces
    - 1st Guards Tank Army
      - 4th Guards Tank Division
      - 47th Tank Division
        - 272nd Motor Rifle Regiment
    - 20th Guards Combined Arms Army
      - 3rd Motor Rifle Division
        - 252nd Motor Rifle Regiment
        - 1220th Motor Rifle Regiment
      - 144th Guards Motor Rifle Division
        - 488th Motor Rifle Regiment
          - 17th Battalion
          - 18th Battalion
    - 6th Combined Arms Army
      - 25th Separate Guards Motor Rifle Brigade
      - 138th Separate Guards Motor Rifle Brigade
      - 1009th Motor Rifle Regiment
    - 11th Army Corps
      - 18th Guards Motor Rifle Division
        - 79th Motor Rifle Regiment
        - 9th Motorized Rifle Regiment
          - 1st Battalion
    - 14th Army Corps
      - 200th Separate Motor Rifle Brigade
    - 44th Army Corps
      - 128th Separate Motor Rifle Brigade
      - 72nd Motor Rifle Division
        - 22nd Motor Rifle Regiment
        - 30th Motor Rifle Regiment
    - 35th Combined Arms Army
      - 38th Separate Guards Motor Rifle Brigade
      - 64th Separate Guards Motor Rifle Brigade
    - 49th Combined Arms Army
      - 34th Separate Guards Mountain Motor Rifle Brigade
  - Russian Navy
    - 155th Guards Naval Infantry Brigade
      - "Varangian" Reconnaissance-Strike Company
      - "Tigr" Battalion
    - 40th Separate Guards Naval Infantry Brigade
    - 810th Guards Naval Infantry Brigade
    - 177th Separate Guards Naval Infantry Regiment
  - Russian Aerospace Forces
    - Russian Air Force
    - "Grom-Kaskad" UAV Brigade
    - Motor Rifle Regiment of the Aerospace Forces
  - Russian Airborne Forces
    - 76th Guards Air Assault Division
    - 98th Guards Airborne Division
      - 217th Guards Airborne Regiment
    - 104th Guards Airborne Division
    - 106th Guards Airborne Division
      - 119th Guards Airborne Regiment
      - 137th Guards Airborne Regiment
      - 51st Guards Airborne Regiment
    - 7th Guards Mountain Air Assault Division
      - 56th Guards Air Assault Regiment
    - 11th Guards Air Assault Brigade
    - 83rd Separate Guards Air Assault Brigade
  - Russian Engineer Troops
    - 11th Separate Guards Engineer Brigade
      - "Feniks" Special Mining Battalion
    - 88th Sapper Regiment
      - Sapper Battalion named after Ivan Kulibin
  - Special Operations Forces
  - Main Intelligence Directorate
    - Spetsnaz GRU
      - 16th Guards Spetsnaz Brigade
  - BARS
    - "BARS-Kursk" volunteer detachment
    - BARS-25 "Anvar"
    - "Tigr" Volunteer Detachment
- Federal Security Service
  - Border Service
- National Guard of Russia
  - Akhmat battalions
  - "Aida" detachment
  - "Varvar" detachment
  - "Kashtan" detachment
  - 11th Detachment
  - "Kamerton" detachment
  - "Talib" Group
  - Wagner Group
- Ministry of Defence
  - 1434th "Akhmat-Chechnya" Regiment
  - Rubicon Center for Advanced Unmanned Systems
  - Volunteer Corps
    - "Bears" Brigade
    - Veterans Brigade
      - "Oleg Mamiev" 3rd reconnaissance and assault detachment
      - "Otvazhnye" assault squad
    - Pyatnashka Brigade
      - "Kurskiye Vityazi" Assault Battalion
      - "Arbat" unit
      - "Pyatnashka" unit
      - "Sarmat" unit
      - "Arkhangely" unit
      - "Shir" unit
    - Alania Battalion
    - "Wolves" Reconnaissance-Assault Brigade
      - "112" Separate Reconnaissance Battalion
    - Oryol Volunteer Detachment
- "Smuglyanka" Drone Detachment
- "Alabai" reconnaissance group
- "Alabiya" Group
- Korean People's Army
  - Korean People's Army Ground Force
    - XI Corps
    - 94th Separate Brigade (Ukrainian claim)
    - 92nd Special Operations Brigade (Ukrainian claim)
    - 94th Special Operations Brigade (Ukrainian claim)

==== Belgorod region ====
- Russian Armed Forces
  - Russian Ground Forces
    - 18th Combined Arms Army
      - 20th Army Corps
        - 3rd Motor Rifle Division
    - 44th Army Corps
      - 128th Motorized Rifle Brigade
    - 49th Combined Arms Army
      - 34th Guards Mountain Motor Rifle Brigade
    - 11th Army Corps
      - 18th Guards Motor Rifle Division
        - 9th Motorised Rifle Regiment
          - 1st Battalion
    - Elements of the 6th Combined Arms Army
    - 3rd Guards Combined Arms Army
      - 85th motorized rifle brigade
      - 88th motorized rifle brigade
  - Orlan Detachment
  - Russian Aerospace Forces
    - Russian Air Force
      - "Grom-Kaskad" UAV Brigade
        - "Irlandtsy" detachment
  - Russian Airborne Forces
    - 76th Guards Air Assault Division
      - 234th Guards Air Assault Regiment
  - Russian Navy
    - Pacific Fleet
      - 40th Separate Guards Naval Infantry Brigade
      - 155th Guards Naval Infantry Brigade
        - "Kara" detachment
    - Caspian Flotilla
      - 177th Naval Infantry Regiment
- Volunteer Corps
  - "Hateful Eight" UAV unit
- Federal Security Service
  - FSB Border Service of Russia
- National Guard of Russia
  - Kadyrovites
    - "Aida" Spetsnaz Detachment
  - BARS
    - BARS-25 "Anvar" volunteer unit

=== Ukrainian forces ===
==== Kursk region ====
- Armed Forces of Ukraine
  - Ukrainian Ground Forces
    - Operational-Tactical Group "Siversk"
      - 10th Mountain Assault Brigade
        - Shkval Battalion
      - 17th Heavy Mechanized Brigade
      - 21st Mechanized Brigade
      - 22nd Mechanized Brigade
        - 1st Mechanized Battalion
      - 27th Rocket Artillery Brigade
      - 41st Mechanized Brigade
      - 44th Artillery Brigade
      - 47th Mechanized Brigade (since September 2024)
        - 1st Mechanized Battalion
        - 2nd Mechanized Battalion
        - 33rd Assault Battalion
        - 130th Mechanized Battalion
      - 49th Artillery Brigade
      - 61st Mechanized Brigade
        - 99th Mechanized Battalion
      - 78th Separate Air Assault Regiment
      - 80th Air Assault Brigade
        - 1st Air Assault Battalion
        - 2nd Battalion
      - 82nd Air Assault Brigade (starting 6 August 2024)
      - 92nd Assault Brigade
        - 1st Assault Battalion
      - 95th Air Assault Brigade (since 10 August 2024)
        - 1st Battalion
      - 103rd Territorial Defense Brigade
      - 104th Territorial Defense Brigade
      - 116th Mechanized Brigade
      - 129th Territorial Defense Brigade
        - "Shkval" Special Battalion
      - 118th Territorial Defense Brigade
        - 156th Territorial Defense Battalion
      - 241st Territorial Defense Brigade
        - 252nd Territorial Defense Battalion
    - 225th Assault Battalion
    - 501st Separate Naval Infantry Battalion
    - International Legion
      - 2nd International Legion
        - North Group
      - Romanian Battlegroup Getica
  - Ukrainian Air Force
  - Special Operations Forces
    - Ranger Corps
      - 4th Special Purpose Regiment
    - 8th Special Operations Regiment
  - Unmanned Systems Forces
    - 14th UAV Regiment
    - 3rd Battalion "Nightingale"
    - 413th UAS Battalion
- Alpha Group
- National Guard of Ukraine
  - Omega group
- Main Directorate of Intelligence
  - Georgian Legion
- Forward Observations Group (Russian claim)

==== Belgorod region ====
- Ukrainian Armed Forces
    - 33rd Assault Regiment
    - 17th NGU Brigade
    - "Tac Team" UAS unit
    - 414th Strike UAV Brigade
  - Ukrainian Air Force
