= Redut =

Russian private military company acting as mercenary umbrella organization

- ЧВК «Редут»
- Logo of the PMC Redut
- Other name: Expeditionary Volunteer Assault Corps
- Founders: Sergey Epishkin (Isakov); Anatoly Karaziy; Gen. Vladimir Alekseyev
- Leaders: Anatoly Karaziy; Davor Savičić; Col. Andrei Troshev; Col. Sergei Salivanov; Lt.-Col. Mikheev Ivan Pavlovich †; Cpt.-Lt. Matlaev Artem †; Maj. Konstantin Mirzayants
- Dates active: 2008–present
- Allegiance: GRU (Russian Federation)
- Size: 200–300 (2019); 2000+ (2022); 7000 (2023); 25000 (2024)
- Part of: Ministry of Defence (Russia) (since 2022)
- Website: redut-czentr.narod.ru/

Redut (Russian: ЧВК «Редут», romanized: ChVK «Redut»), also known as Redoubt, Redut-Antiterror, Redut Security or Centre R, formerly known as "Shield", is a registered Russian Private Military Company (PMC) that is a part of the "Antiterror-family", a group of PMCs that protect commercial operations of Russian companies. It is currently deployed by Russia in the Russian invasion of Ukraine. According to an RFE/RL investigation, concurrent "Redut" is controlled by the GRU and acts as a proxy umbrella organization for mercenaries, managing finances, recruitment and logistical supply of various formations.

It was established in 2008, as a merger of several minor veteran groupings of the Russian Foreign Intelligence Service, Russian Air Force and units of the Russian Ministry of Defence (MoD), who had obtained combat experience in military and peacekeeping missions. Members of the group have been convicted of committing war crimes during the Russian invasion of Ukraine.

== History ==
=== Emergence ===
According to Norwegian researchers from the Forsvarets Forskningsinstitutt - FFI (Norwegian Defence Research Establishment), Redut-Antiterror emerged in 2008 from the PMSC Antiterror-Orel, which was founded in 2003 by members of the Russian Special Forces. It is an affiliate or former branch of the Antiterror-Orel offshoot Tiger Top Rent Security and primarily recruits soldiers of the Russian 45th Guards Special Reconnaissance Brigade. Until 2022, Redut mainly offered the protection of Russian convoys and corporate real estate — including oil production facilities, military installations and Russian diplomats in many countries worldwide, for example of Gennady Timchenko's JSC Stroytransgaz facilities in Syria during the Syrian civil war. It also provided military training and advisors for e.g. pro-Russian Abkhazian forces during the Russo-Georgian War. The leaders of Redut at these times were the only registered shareholder of "Redut-Security", former head of the Slavonic Corps Yevgeny Sidorov, and Konstantin Mirzayants, who reportedly led Redut to fight in the Russian invasion of Ukraine. It is not clear how Mirzayants and Sidorov were involved in the reformation of Redut. In 2022 and in preparation for the Russian invasion of Ukraine, Redut was planned to be a major competitor for the Russian MoD in the PMC scene, due to a rivalry between the Wagner Group and the MoD. This was organized by the deputy head of the GRU (Russian intelligence), General Vladimir Alexeyev, who made Anatoly Karaziy, a relative of his, head of the structure.

=== Russian invasion of Ukraine ===
For the invasion, Redut recruited many members of the Wagner Group and Special Forces, totalling several thousands in January 2022, which angered Wagner head Yevgeny Prigozhin. The same month, he was invited to the office on Khoroshevskoye Highway. At first Prigozhin told Alexeyev that if Karaziy did not stop recruiting Wagner employees for Redut, Prigozhin would "end" Karaziy. In response to this, Alexeyev allegedly invited Prigozhin to go to another office, where Karaziy was already waiting for him, who offered to sort it out on the spot. According to the source, Prigozhin was taken aback and began to say that he was misunderstood, and later retreated. Alexeyev said that it was the Redut that was to play a decisive role in the first days of the invasion. According to one of the sources, it included a group that was supposed to kill Zelensky on the day of the invasion in the Kyiv offensive. Alexeyev himself was engaged not only in the military part, but also in the political one—he had to organize the transfer of power to new hands and negotiated this with Ukrainian politicians, for example with Mykola Azarov. Many of the plans of the GRU turned out to be known in advance to the Western and Ukrainian special services. In the Kyiv offensive, Redut sustained heavy losses in which the fighting force had suffered up to 90% losses, which practically eliminated the Redut PMC, leaving Prigozhin's Wagner Group to dominate the scene.

=== Nationalization of Redut ===
After this event, remaining Redut contractors were invited to their base in Kubinka and were offered contracts by the Russian MoD, to serve officially in the Russian Armed Forces. As claimed by one of Redut's former commanders, that is why Redut is completely controlled and effectively reformed by the Russian MoD. Despite the heavy casualties, Redut PMC grew sharply to around 7,000 soldiers in 2023, in part due to recruitment of prisoners and labor migrants from e.g. CIS states. At this time, Redut became one of the MoD's main recruiting projects for mercenary formations. In early 2023, Redut and the UDV held a congress in Russian-occupied Mariupol, where more than 450 fighters and officers announced that all Russian "volunteer" militias were going to be merged into a so-called "Russian Volunteer Corps", for which Redut serves as the parent company. The document establishing the corps was signed by retired GRU Colonel Aleksei Kondratyev.

=== Fall of Wagner ===
After the aborted Wagner coup attempt, the MoD tried to dissolve the Wagner Group, by absorbing, eliminating or taking over parts of Wagner. Redut, along with Convoy, plays a key role, by directly profiting of these actions as a government controlled entity. Experts assessed that Redut likely possesses the capabilities and intent to take over operations of its rival Wagner in Syria and other countries after the likely decapitation of Wagner's leadership, although noting that it doesn't have the same niveau of fighting experience in comparison. Others saw a pro-MoD rebranding of Wagner as more likely. In July 2023, Wagner mercenaries in Syria and Ukraine were offered the opportunity to move to Redut, which is in active competition with Wagner. A number of former Wagnerites joined Redut formations after this. In August, ISW reported that efforts to dissolve Wagner partially succeeded, with two high-ranking Wagner representatives and commanders, namely Andrey "Sedoy" ("Grey" – ed.) Troshev and Vadim V. (alias: "Khrustal"), defecting to Redut—as claimed by the MoD and other Wagner commanders. Furthermore, the Russian MoD is apparently using them to recruit Wagner personnel under the promise of new missions in Africa. Shortly before the death of Wagner founders Prigozhin and Dmitry Utkin, Redut began preparation to enter Africa, focusing recruitment efforts on this area. iStories found posts on social networks urging people to join Redut with this message: "Wagner is in the past. If you are really interested in real work in Africa, the Ministry of Defence and PMC Redut is your choice!".

Emblem of the Volunteer Assault Corps

In October 2023 Russian state media reported on the formation of the "Expeditionary Volunteer Assault Corps" which unified several volunteer units such as "Wolves", "Dnepr", "Don", "Terek", BARS, "Nevsky", "Veterans", "St. George the Victorious", "Sever-Z" and others under a single command. Anatoly Bibilov, deputy commander of the corps for military and political work, noted that the word "Expeditionary" in the corps' name means that the unit is ready to carry out the tasks set by the Russian Ministry of Defense "anywhere regardless of place and time". He also claimed that every unit of the corps signed contracts with the MoD. According to Russian OSINT analysts from AmalNews the corps is curated by Troshev.

=== Re-organization and growth ===
As of 2024, Redut grew to tens of thousands of operatives, estimated at 25,000, managing up to 20 formations. According to Mark Galeotti, director of Mayak Intelligence, Redut has emerged as the main Russian PMC and is much more active in Africa and Syria. Redut has notable presence and activity in Africa with the Bears Brigade. Konstantin Mirzayants, the leader of Redut, is reportedly closely involved in the MoD's operations in Africa and the creation of the "Africa Corps", which seeks to take over Wagner's structures in Africa.

== Organization ==
According to Candace Rondeaux, Redut members tend to be abstemious and disciplined. Rondeaux states that under Russian law, one wing of Redut is categorized as a "military training centre" and the whole is in her opinion "not a PMC, not some sort of special company" though she admits that it has extraterritorial operations. She further states that Redut "is fully folded into the Ministry of Defense infrastructure and always has been." The 2023 RFE/RFL investigation confirmed "Redut" being a front for GRU operations, maintained through a network of shadow companies, fictitious legal entities and virtual military units with the primary purpose of legally distancing the special operations from Russian government.

=== Recruitment ===
According to an investigation by the Russian-language version of RFE/RFL, advertisements for Redut formations are quite actively placed in Russian social media. Official requirements for application are at least 25 to 45 years of age, military and law enforcement agency experience, no ongoing law enforcement prosecution (expunged convictions, other than for pedophilia, drug distribution, or rape, are accepted) and medical certificates of the absence of tuberculosis (fluorography), hepatitis and HIV. However a member of the formation said that requirements are much lower. It was leaked that representatives of Redut recruit convicts in high-security prisons.

A leaked contract referred to Redut as "RLSPI", which is described as a construction company registered in Rostov-on-Don, without mentioning military service. "RLSPI" is a regional laboratory for socio-psychological research [Unit 35555] under the Russian Ministry of Defense, located in Rostov-on-Don and belonging to the GRU, which is not indicated in the document. Additionally, payments in case of injury, death, and accommodation are specified. Since the annexation of four Ukrainian Oblasts, salary is paid in rubles instead of dollars, since Russian authorities no longer consider these territories foreign.

iStories reported that a journalist of theirs got offered to join the Redut formation "Wolves", to fight in Ukraine, without signing a MoD contract—bypassing the Russian MoD's requirement since 1 July for all volunteer formations participating in the war to have one. This contradicts a statement by State Duma deputy Maxim Ivanov, who assured that "Redut" and its units signed contracts with the Ministry of Defence.

As reported by iStories in October 2023, women are also being recruited into the ranks of Redut's formation "Borz Battalion" now, as snipers and drone operators. Recruitment of women also started in the Española Battalion.

=== Units ===
==== Don Brigade ====
Redut is believed to have a unit called "Don Brigade" which is part of the Union of Donbass Volunteers (also called "Don and the Union of Donbas Volunteers", or "UDV"), a veterans organization with many ethnic Cossack fighters, also listed in BARS and linked to the Russian MoD. Contractors are recruited and paid by Redut, which acts as a financial institution. Many of them directly join Redut in special "Don units", while still formally considered part of the UDV. It consists of the battalion "Terek", with two more in line for recruiting—"Kuban" and "Yenisei". After a congress to determine the future of Russian volunteer mercenary groups in 2023, the Union of Donbas Volunteers—including the Don Brigade and other units—was fully absorbed into Redut, to form the "Russian Volunteer Corps".

==== Bears Brigade ====
The 81st Special Forces Brigade, known as the "Bears Brigade" is a Redut mercenary formation that is deployed in Africa and the Russian invasion of Ukraine to serve Russian strategic interests, to train and protect Russian allies and their facilities. Contracts are signed with Russia's GRU. Along with the Africa Corps, the formation was created to fill the void of the declining Wagner Group, and to tighten the MoD's grip on existing Russian private paramilitary structures abroad. The unit has seen action in the country of Burkina Faso, where it was ordered to assist the pro-Russian authoritarian military junta against Islamist terror attacks. Parts of the formation were called home to aid Russian forces during the Ukrainian incursion into Kursk Oblast in late August 2024.

Although being a self-claimed brigade, analysts estimate the formation to be between one and two battalions large.

==== Wolves Battalion ====
The reconnaissance and sabotage detachment "Wolves Battalion" is a Russian mercenary formation that is subordinate to Redut and overseen by the 16th Guards Spetsnaz Brigade. In the early days of the invasion, the formation numbered 400 fighters. The salary for fighters ranges between $1800 and $2200 and is paid in cash. Contracts are offered for a length of three or six months. Requirements for application are full name and date of birth, a drivers license, background on military and civilian skills, and the criminal and health record. In early 2022, the Wolves were ordered to aid the Kyiv offensive and participated in the occupation of villages and battles in the Borodianka Raion. When the advance on Kyiv failed, they were tasked with covering the withdrawal of Russian troops from the area. Later, their battalion was ordered to retreat to Belarus and then to a base in Valuyki, near the Ukrainian border in western Russia. After they regrouped, the battalion was deployed to Kharkiv Oblast in September to resist Ukraine's liberation efforts there, taking heavy casualties. They were stationed near the stronghold Balakliia and ordered to set up positions at the town's entrance. That night, Ukrainian forces entered Balakliia, leading to the retreat of Russian troops. A group, cut off and stranded, hid in the town for nearly three weeks before being captured. Notably, these four Redut fighters were discovered in their hideout and arrested, and later all convicted for the war crime of torture in a Ukrainian court. The drone operator Cpt.-Lt. Matlaev Artem was killed in combat.

==== Potok Battalion ====
In early 2023, Gazprom Neft, a subsidiary of Gazprom, was given permission to form a PMSC by the Russian prime minister Mikhail Mishustin. According to research by BBC News Russian, organization started in the city of Omsk, under the name "Gazprom Neft Security", led by former high-ranking members of Russia's Federal Security Service and Internal Affairs Ministry. The three main formations are "Fakel" (Torch), "Potok" (Stream) and "Plamya" (Flame), which are under control of the Russian MoD. Later in April, members of the voluntary Gazprom military formation "Potok" were forced to sign contracts with Redut by the Russian MoD, to fight with "Potok" under the command of Redut. "Potok" participated in battles near Bakhmut, took over some Wagner positions, but later left them due to insufficient preparation and supplies. Yevgeny Prigozhin claimed that Gazprom established its own PMC "to weaken the influence of the Wagner PMC.".

==== Veterans Battalion ====
Logo and Patch of the Redut formation "Veterans"

The "Veterans Battalion" is reported to be part of Redut, with Redut conducting its recruitment and acting as a financial institution. Contracts can be signed for either 6 or 12 months of service, with pay estimates at around £2150 a month, going up depending on experience, performance, and rank. It is being advertised on social media such as Telegram, their website, and profits of positive reporting of Russian state TV on it. Required for joining is experience with small arms, 21 to 55 years of age, good physical shape, Russian passport and military identification. They are a well equipped with high quality weaponry, like drones and UAVs, APCs, MBTs, IFVs, logistical vehicles, automatic grenade launchers, mortars and artillery systems. Additionally, they are assessed to have superior training and significant combat experience in comparison to other Russian units, and are said to work effectively with other units. "Veterans" is known for its distinctive patch showing Russian president Vladimir Putin. According to reports, the 2nd Battalion of the 60th "Veterans" Separate Air Assault Brigade is operating on one of the Bakhmut flanks.

==== Espanola Battalion ====
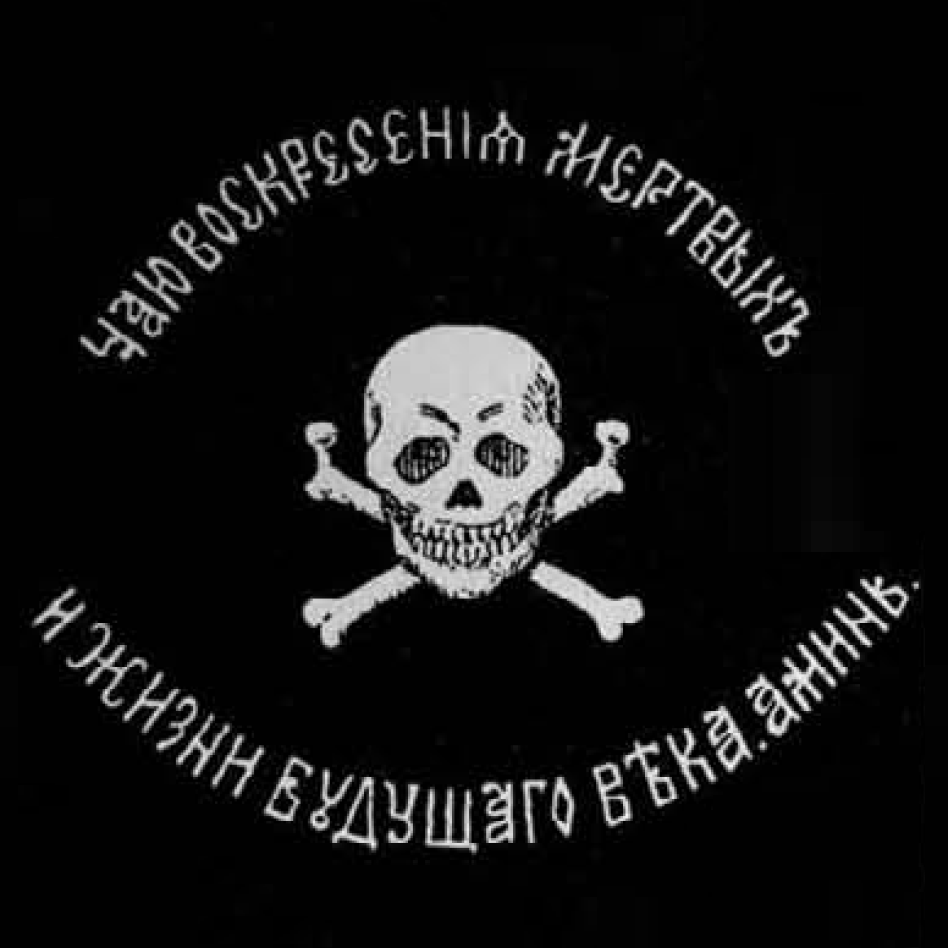
Patch of the Redut formation "Espanola"

The 88th Reconnaissance and Sabotage Brigade "Espaniola" was a military formation primarily consisting of radical Russian soccer fans who became fighters in Ukraine. Contracts of the battalion are signed with Redut. Donbas veteran Stanislav Orlov, also known as "The Spaniard," due to his proficiency in languages, was the founder and leader of Espanola, the units' name being a play on Orlov's nom guerre "Spaniard" as well as Treasure Island's pirate schooner Hispaniola. Ukrainian intelligence reported that Espanola pays volunteers 220,000 rubles (£1,900) a month and offers lucrative insurance payouts. Recruits have to serve for a minimum of six months. The formation consists of an assault, reconnaissance, drone and air defence company. The Espanola group primarily recruited through Telegram and VK, targeting not only football ultras but also neo-Nazis and the far-right. Requirements for service were a health check and a fitness test. Reportedly, it was backed by Russian billionaire Viktor Shendrik, the head of the security department of Russian Railways, who also funded other mercenaries. Espanola fighters were involved in the assault on Azovstal in direct engagements with the Azov Brigade, in combat on the Kherson and Zaporizhzhia fronts, as well as near Vuhledar, Avdiivka and Bakhmut. Espanola's intelligence chief was killed in early March 2024.

==== Others ====
As an umbrella organization that provides supplies and manpower to subordinated mercenary formations, Redut closely collaborates with at least 20 different entities — among them the "Listan" battalion, "Skif" battalion, "Tigers" volunteer formation, "Veter 117" formation and the "Nevsky" battalion. Sources in the PMC say that the formations called "Ilimovtsy", "Hooligans", "Marines" and "Axes" were involved in the early days of the Northern Ukraine campaign. The "North" formation took heavy losses when engaging in friendly fire in the Kyiv offensive due to poor communication, fatally wounding the commander of the "North Group" Lt.-Col. Mikheev Ivan Pavlovich ("Sever") †.

=== Funding ===
Redut receives its funding through the Russian Ministry of Defense, with General Vladimir Alexeyev (GRU) being a main patron. Other major backers of the company are said to be Oleg Deripaska and Gennady Timchenko, according to information provided by the website Gulagu.net founded by Russian dissident Vladimir Osechkin, which cites a Redut deputy commander testifying under cover names. From them, the PMC received armored personnel carriers, helmets, and protective vests. Redut has reportedly altered its sources of support multiple times.

== Sanctions ==
On 24 February 2023, Redut was designated a Russian mercenary force—controlled by and linked to the GRU—fighting Ukraine by the United States Department of the Treasury, according to executive order "E.O. 14024" by the United States President. Thus blocking any transfer, pay, export or withdraw of Redut's possessions and property in the United States.

Ukrainian lawmakers approved Resolution "#3735" on 9 February 2023, recognizing Redut and other Russian private military companies as terrorist organizations.

On 18 December 2023, PMC "Redut" was included in the sanctions list of the European Union:

"Private Military Company Redut (“PMC Redut”) is a Russia-based unincorporated private military entity, which reportedly works under the command of the Ministry of Defence of the Russian Federation. It undertakes security and military-related activities, with direct participation in military conflicts. While previously associated with activities in Syria, in the context of Russia’s war of aggression against Ukraine PMC Redut has engaged in combat activities in Ukraine, near the Chernobyl Nuclear Power Plant and Kharkiv, as well as undertaken reconnaissance efforts prior to the war of aggression against Ukraine. It has also been linked to assassination attempts against the President of Ukraine Volodymyr Zelenskyy."

— "Official Journal of the European Union", Brussels, December 18, 2023

On 22 February 2024, Redut was included in the UK sanctions list as a PMC "which, according to available data, is engaged in recruiting and sending militants to serve alongside Russian troops in Ukraine.". For similar reasons, Redut is under sanctions in Ukraine, Switzerland and New Zealand.

== Activities ==
=== Main areas ===
- Ukraine: After conducting reconnaissance beyond the demarcation line in the Donbas on the night of 23 February 2022, Redut formations were deployed in the Kyiv offensive and took part in the capture of Chernobyl. From there, units were ordered on a covert mission in the Kyiv region to infiltrate and eliminate the political leadership and the Ukrainian Secret Service. From the beginning, Redut units also took part in the battle of Donbas—including the battle of Kharkiv, the battle of the Siverskyi Donets and the battle of Balakliia. As of mid-July 2022, two detachments of Redut, each counting 200 fighters, were operating in the Donbas region of Ukraine, both led by former Wagner Group commanders. Per ISW, the Redut formation "Veterans" is operating in the battle of Bakhmut on the flanks of the city. The Redut formation "Española" took part in the assault on Azovstal,and later in the hostilities near Chasiv Yar in 2024.
- Burkina Faso: As part of efforts to control the activities of Russian private military groups abroad, Redut formation "Bears" is deployed to support Russian strategic interests in Africa.

=== Former areas ===
There are indications that Redut provided military advisors and trainers for Abkhazian units in the Russo-Georgian War. It also saw action in Lebanon, Iraq, Syria, Somalia, Caribbean countries, the former Yugoslavia, as well as Afghanistan and Indonesia. Its services included the deployment of snipers, pioneers and guards. Redut formations have been deployed to protect convoys, corporate real estate—including oil production facilities, military installations and Russian diplomats, for example defending JSC Stroytransgaz facilities in Syria. In order to establish itself in the Iraq environment, the company received direct support from the FSB (Russian intelligence).

== War crimes ==
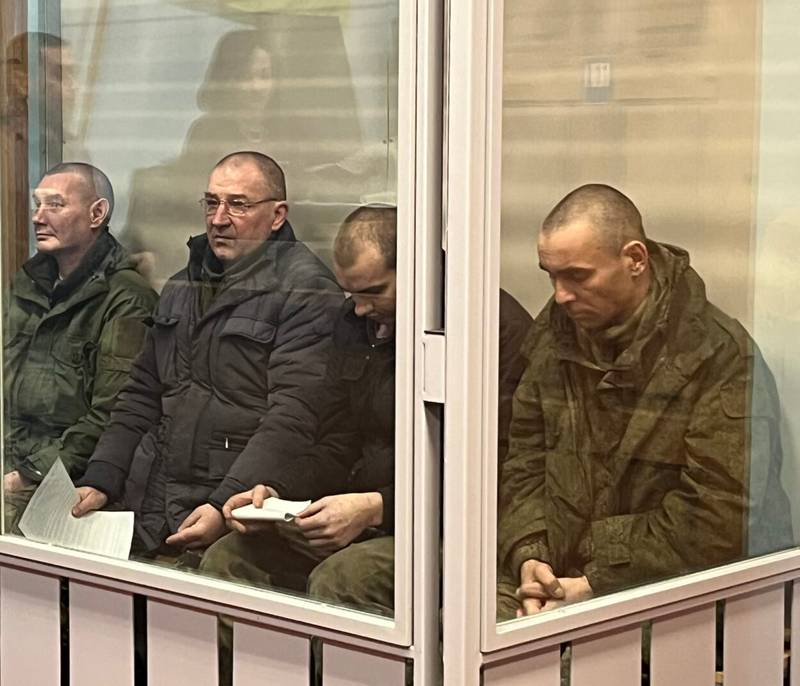
Redut PMC and GRU fighters being prosecuted in Kotelevskyi District Court, Poltava Oblast, Ukraine

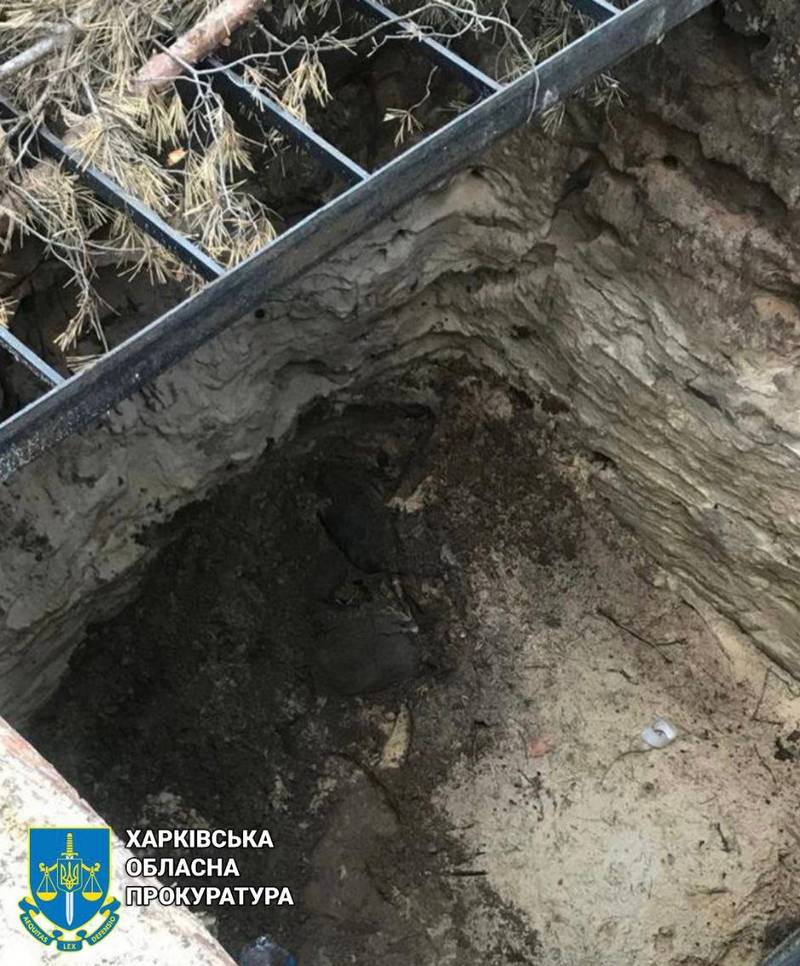
Torture pit for ATO veterans in Borova, Kharkiv Oblast

Four Redut fighters have been convicted of war crimes. On 23 December 2022, the "Wolves" operatives Ruslan Kolesnikov (born 1968), Mikhail Ivanov (b. 1977), Maksim Volvak (b. 1992) and Valentin Bych (b. 1980) were convicted of abducting and torturing three ATO veterans from the urban settlement Borova in Kharkiv Oblast at the beginning of September, and sentenced to 11 years imprisonment by the Kobelevskiy District Court in Poltava Oblast. The three victims were abducted for interrogation to find other ATO veterans, held with bags over their heads and with hands bound. During the interrogation process, they were thrown into a pit for three days without food and water, repeatedly beaten on the limbs with hammers and threatened that their fingers would be cut off. Prior, three ATO veterans with torture marks were discovered dead in this hole. Another Redut fighter, Belarusian national Maksym Ziaziulchyk (b. 2001), was sentenced to ten years imprisonment for fighting against Ukraine as a mercenary in the formation "Veterans".

== Composition ==
- Redut
  - Union of Cossack Warriors of Russia and Abroad
    - Don Brigade
      - Listan Battalion
    - Terek Brigade
      - Skif Battalion
    - Siberia Cossack Brigade
  - Owned by Redut, supervised by 16th Special Forces Brigade of the GRU
    - Volki ("Wolves") Brigade
    - Tigry ("Tigers") Formation
    - Veter 177 Formation
    - Nevsky Formation
  - Union of Donbass Volunteers
    - Sever ("North") Formation
    - Tsentr ("Center") Formation
    - St. George's Brigade
      - Zubr ("Bison") Formation
      - Kherson Formation
      - Artdivision Formation
      - Vikhr ("Whirlwind") Formation
  - Veterans of Russia Movement
    - Veterans Brigade
  - Gazprom Neft Security
    - Potok ("Stream") Formation
  - Others
    - Bears Brigade
    - Lev ("Lion") Formation
    - Rysi ("Lynx") Formation
    - Borz Formation
    - Española Formation
    - Troya ("Troy") Formation
    - Irbis ("Snow Leopard") Formation
    - ~~Imperial Legion Formation~~ (left "Redut")
    - ~~Rusich Formation~~ (left "Redut")

== See also ==
- List of private security and military companies
- Russian irregular units in Ukraine
- Russian invasion of Ukraine
- Fakel (PMC)
- Patriot (PMC)
- Wagner Group
