= Union of Donbass Volunteers =

- Союз добровольцев Донбасса
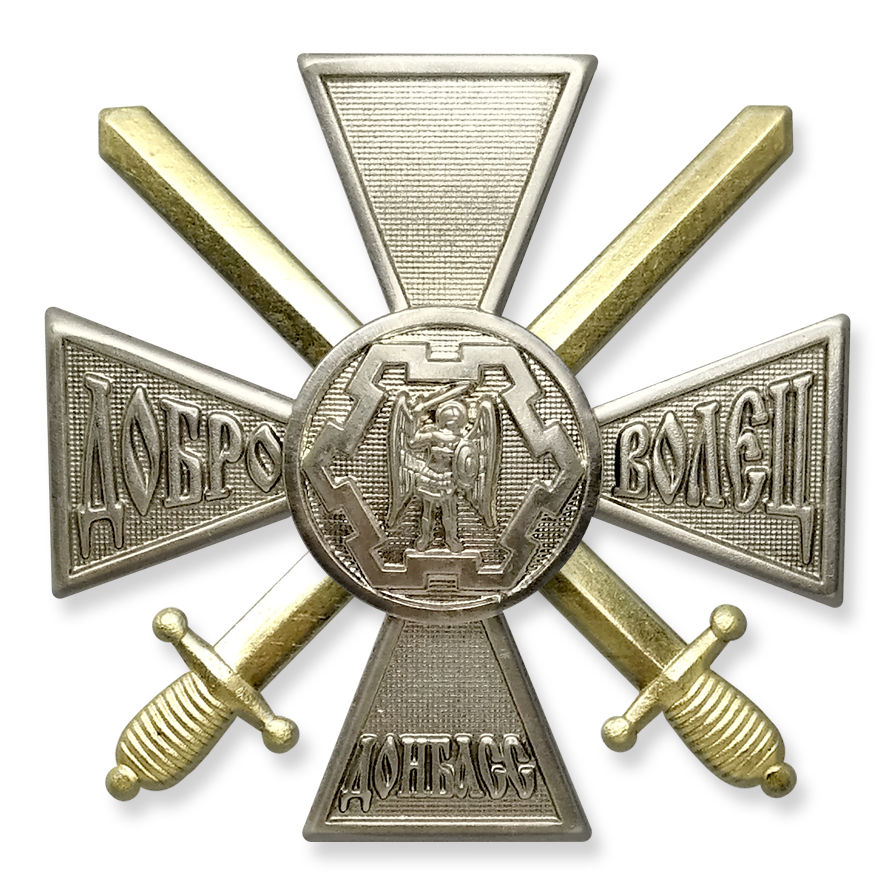
- Logo
- Founded: August 27, 2015
- Country: Russia
- Allegiance: Russian people's militias in Ukraine
- Branch: Army reserve
- Type: Paramilitary
- Role: Enforce Russian command over separatist forces. Maintain separatist veterans for future conflict.
- Size: 14,500 (2022)
- Part of: "Council of Commanders"
- Nickname: UDV
- Engagements: Russo-Ukrainian War: War in Donbas; Russian invasion of Ukraine; Syrian civil war

Commanders
- Current commander: Alexander Boroday
- Notable commanders: Alexander Tkachev; Oleg Mamiev; Vladislav Surkov; Alexey Milchakov; Sergey Dubinskiy; Andrei Pinchuk; Vasily Geranin; Igor Girkin

The Union of Donbass volunteers (UDV) is a Russian paramilitary veterans organization founded in 2015 for Russian veterans in the War in the Donbas, and has been used as a mercenary force and platform by the Russian government for operations in Ukraine before the Russian invasion of Ukraine, when the UDV's members were called back into active service.

== History ==
The UDV was founded by Alexander Boroday, a member of the Russian Duma for the United Russia party, and former Prime Minister of the Donetsk People's Republic (DPR). However, Boroday is a political front, as the real leader and organizer is Vladislav Surkov, a longtime advisor and ally of Vladimir Putin.

According to Russian state media agency TASS, the UDV was founded on August 27, 2015, with between 30,000 and 40,000 Russian residents being eligible to join, despite Russia maintaining that no Russians fought in Ukraine during the War in the Donbas. The UDV acts as a veterans organization, offering pensions, benefits, and payment for the Russian volunteers that fought the Ukrainian army. During the interwar period from 2014 to 2022 the UDV also acted as a pressure group within Russia in favor for recognition and annexation of the Donetsk People's Republic and the Luhansk People's Republic. Also during the interwar period the UDV largely functioned to retain veterans, hosting live fire training drills and hosting fraternal events. Additionally, the UDV served to retain the combat efficiency of veterans from the war in the Donbas for future operations against Ukraine.

Many members of the UDV are openly neo-nazis with several instances of members wearing swastika patches when being interviewed. Prominent Russian neo-nazi Alexey Milchakov was one of the leading figures in the UDV from 2014 to 2015. Milchakov, after his time fighting as a separatist in the Donbas, returned to Saint Petersburg to found the Rusich Group.

One of the volunteer groups within the UDV is the Don Brigade, a mercenary unit that is a part of PMC Redut that has ties to the Union of Cossack Warriors of Russia and Abroad which is also led by Borodai.

During the 2019 Moscow protests the UDV asked the Russian government if they could be sent to fight the protesters in the streets.

The UDV's sixth "congress of commanders" was held in the Tsargrad Hotel in Russian occupied Donetsk on October 31, 2020, hosted by Russian oligarch Konstantin Malofeev. At said congress Boroday stated that he was going to shift the UDV to be more overtly political and more active in the Russian political life, aiming to take part in the 2021 State Duma elections as a political party, in a coalition with Rodina. Additionally, at the meeting, the UDV's council of commanders voted against sending UDV members to Karabakh to aid the Republic of Artsakh. Malofeev also gave a speech at the congress where he stated that the UDV fought for the defense of the entire Russian World.

The UDV organizing units for future combat operations in February 2022 was one of the early warning signs for the impending Russian invasion of Ukraine. Before the Russian invasion the UDV claimed to have had 49 chapters and over 14,500 members. The UBV would be sanctioned by the Canadian government shortly after the invasion for its support of the invasion as well as performing reconnaissance for the Russian army, training Russian conscripts, and violating E.O. 14024, or "being responsible for or complicit in, or for having directly or indirectly engaged or attempted to engage in, activities that undermine the peace, security, political stability, or territorial integrity of the United States, its allies, or its partners, for or on behalf of, or for the benefit of, directly or indirectly, the [Government of Russia]."

The UDV has maintained a unified command structure for its units, similar to Russian private military contractors such as the Wagner Group or Redut. Confirmed UDV units include three BARS units, BARS-20 "Grom", BARS-9 "Eagle", and BARS-13 "Russian Legion", as well as the "Sever" formation, the "Tsentr" formation, and "St. George's Brigade". On February 4, 2023, the UDV held a "congress" in Russian-occupied Mariupol, where more than 450 fighters and officers announced that all "volunteer" militias were going to be merged into a so-called "Russian Volunteer Corps" which would merge Redut and the UDV. The document establishing the corps was signed by retired GRU Colonel Aleksei Kondratyev, a stringent supporter of the UDV in its earlier years. In September 2022 the UDV complained that a hospital in Rostov-on-Don was refusing to service its members due to their lack of status in the Russian army. The hospital in question primarily services Russian military personnel severely wounded during the invasion.

During the Battle of Bakhmut, a member of the UDV, a military doctor, Yuri Yevich, was arrested for “discrediting the Russian armed forces,” much to the dismay of Russian milbloggers. On July 21, 2023, Boroday's vehicle in a UDV convoy just south of Bakhmut would be shelled by Ukrainian forces. Boroday would survive with non life-threatening injuries.

== Balkan presence ==
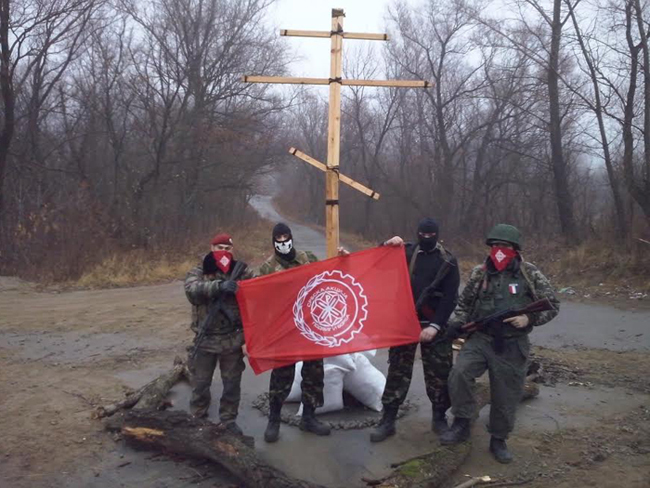
Members of the far-right Serbian Action militia in the Donbas in 2015, affiliated with the Balkan UDV

The UDV also maintains a presence in the Balkans, made up of Serbian volunteers to the Russian separatists that also actively participated in the Yugoslav Wars with several high-ranking members participating in the Bosnian genocide. The UDV also maintains a Russian section of the Višegrad cemetery for Russian volunteers to Serbia that were fatalities during the war, and maintains contacts in Serbia through Zavet, a Russian cultural organization that coordinates between the Republika Srpska and Russian government and is affiliated with the Liberal Democratic Party of Russia. When asked for comment about their presence in Serbia, the UDV's leader in the Balkans, Aleksandar Kravchenko, told Balkan Insight that they are "Muslim media" that "publish[es] unverified, anti-Serb, anti-Russian and anti-Orthodox stories. I can see no way that I could talk to you.” The Serbian chapter was formed in 2015 as a fraternal organization for Serbian volunteers on the Russian side during the War in Donbas that also provided the fighters with a pension, as they were non-state actors that would otherwise receive no recognition or reward for their services to Russia. In part due to this, the Serbian government has banned most of its leaders from entering the country, not seeking to spark an international incident with the European Union, instead keeping the UDV in the neighboring Republika Srpska. the UDV also maintains close ties to the Balkan Cossack Army, based in Kotor, that consists of Russian expatriates living in Montenegro. Additionally, the UDV in Serbia's leadership were also involved in the Kosovo Front, a Russian volunteer group that fought in the Kosovo War. The UDV also acts as a political pressure group in both Srpska and Serbia to move both states away from the west and closer to Russia, being staunchly anti-NATO and anti-EU. The UDV successfully lobbied the Sprska government to name April 12 as "The Day of Russian Volunteers" a national holiday where Srpska officials meet with the UDV and other Russian organizations in Višegrad.

After the commencement of the Russian Invasion of Ukraine, the UDV network in Sprska, Serbia, and Montenegro began sending ethnic Serbian volunteers to fight for Russian forces despite fighting in a foreign war being illegal in both Serbia and Bosnia. Membership exploded with a massive rise in participation with Serbian far-right groups, who, despite flying flags with swastikas, claimed that Putin is fighting Ukraine's “Nazi pro-Western government”.
