= Espaniola brigade =

Russian irregular unit of football ultras

88th Reconnaissance and Sabotage Brigade "Espaniola"
- 88-я разведывательно-диверсионная бригада «Эспаньола»
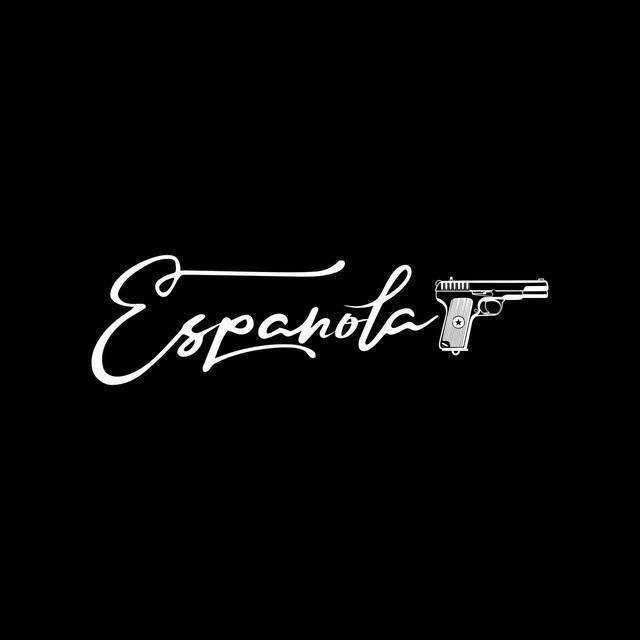
- Espaniola's logo
- Founded: Spring 2022
- Disbanded: 3 October 2025
- Country: Russia
- Type: Infantry
- Size: 550 members (self-claim, 2023)
- Part of: Vostok Battalion (2022–2023); Volunteer Corps (2023–2025)
- Colours: Black and white
- Engagements: Russian invasion of Ukraine; Battle of Mariupol; Battle of Bakhmut; Battle of Avdiivka; Battle of Chasiv Yar

Commanders
- Commander: Stanislav Orlov (– 2025)

The 88th Reconnaissance and Sabotage Brigade "Espaniola" (Russian: 88-я разведывательно-диверсионная бригада «Эспаньола» (88 РДБр), romanized: 88-ya razvedyvatel'no-diversionnaya brigada "Espan'yola") was a Russian irregular military formation created from radical fans of football clubs, including CSKA, Spartak, Torpedo, Zenit, Lokomotiv, Oryol and other teams. Stanislav Orlov, call sign "Spaniard" (Russian: «Испанец», romanized: "Ispanets") and a representative of the Red-Blue Warriors group, served as detachment commander.

At the beginning of its existence, the formation existed under the Vostok battalion of the self-proclaimed Donetsk People's Republic (DPR). It was eventually put under the command of PMC Redut from Russia's military intelligence service GRU.

Many of the members of the brigade espouse right-wing, far-right, and neo-Nazi views. Espaniola is also known as the "88th Brigade", which according to Molfar is an explicit neo-Nazi reference. Members of the brigade refer to "14/88" and some have the numbers as a tattoo.

On October 3, 2025, Espaniola announced its disbandment as a reorganization of the group.

== History ==
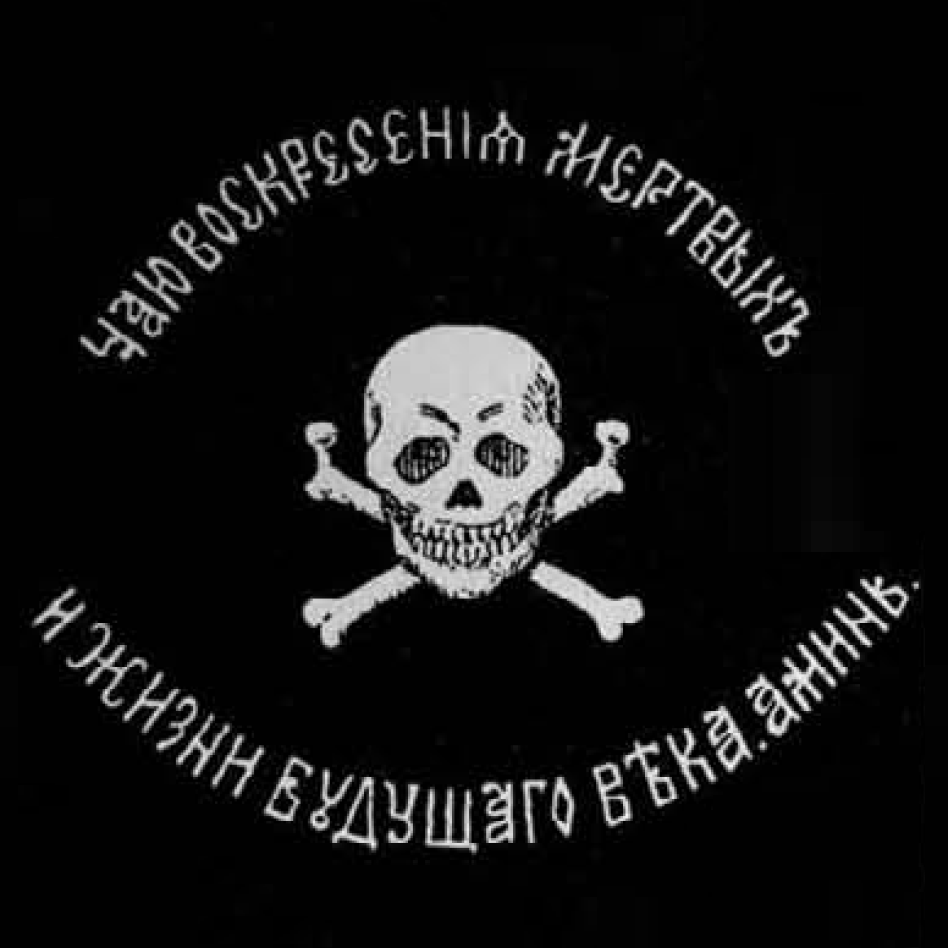
One of the symbols of the battalion is the so-called "Baklanov Flag", the flag of Yakov Baklanov, lieutenant general of the Russian Imperial Army.

Initially, the battalion was formed as a volunteer unit, and then was integrated into the armed forces of the DPR. According to The Times, created by Stanislav Orlov and Alexander Khodakovsky. The unit took part in the fighting during the assault on Azovstal, as well as on the Kherson and Zaporizhzhia fronts. In the spring of 2023, Espaniola announced that it had become a private military company.

The banner of General Yakov Baklanov, who participated in the Caucasian War, is used as one of the symbols.

There were claims that on November 5, 2024, that the Russian Deputy Commander of the Brigade's Sniper Platoon, Pavel "Joker" Apalkov, was killed in combat in the Chasiv Yar direction.

On the night of 23–24 June, Russian milbloggers claimed that two Neptune missiles struck the command post of the Russian 88th "Hispaniola" Volunteer Brigade in Crimea. However they claimed that the base was evacuated before the missile strike.

In October 2025, the brigade was disbanded. According to an announcement on its Telegram channel, the unit was to be reformed into an assault unit and an electronic warfare unit. The same statement noted that the brigade's naval center and the "Melodiya" reconnaissance center would be reorganized as separate entities.

On 4 December 2025, Stanislav Orlov died under unclear circumstances. His death was confirmed by the brigade on 19 December. According to Pjotr Sauer of The Guardian, there was significant speculation that Orlov was assassinated by Russian state security as part of a crackdown on ultranationalist armed groups.

== Members ==
The battalion consists of football fans of Russian clubs Zenit, Lokomotiv, Oryol, Spartak, Torpedo, CSKA and other teams. According to Hispaniola commander Stanislav Orlov, the battalion initially numbered 500 people, including 100 kamikaze drone operators. The unit is equipped by football fans from all over Russia. According to Orlov, the state and businessmen do not provide financial support to the unit.

According to media reports, Espaniola is recruiting fighters with certain combat and technical skills: reconnaissance saboteurs, snipers, drone operators, electronic warfare, air defense, anti-tank guided missiles, signalmen, driver mechanics, doctors. The battalion has its own training ground for military recruits, where they are also taught how to clear mines, pilot drones and operate missile defense systems.

On 11 December 2025 Russian Telegram channels reported Stanislav Orlov and Alexey Zhivov were detained in relation to an illicit weapons trade with Orlov possibly shot. Russian media claimed none of them were shot but there has been an internal conflict between unit's leaders on criminal motives. Orlov has been confirmed dead as of December 18, 2025. Opposition commentators on the other hand wrote Orlov was deliberately executed and presented CCTV footage of Russian servicemen arriving at his compound on Crimea, shortly before gunfire can be heard. The body was recovered hours later. The funeral service was held at Cathedral of Christ the Saviour in Moscow. Analyst Andrei Kolesnikov concluded that Orlovs killing was part of a purge against leaders of paramilitary groups.

=== Famous members ===
On August 7, 2023, former player of the Russian national team, CSKA Moscow and Lokomotiv, Andrei Solomatin announced his entry into the Espaniola battalion. He also said that he received the call sign "Soloma" and is located near Bakhmut.
