= Torbjörn Törnqvist =

Swedish business executive (born 1953)

- Born: 1953 (age 72–73); Stockholm, Sweden
- Education: Stockholm University
- Occupation: Businessman

Torbjörn Törnqvist (born 1953) is a Swedish billionaire, and the former CEO and co-founder of Gunvor, "one of the largest commodities conglomerates in the world", with the Russian billionaire, Gennady Timchenko.

== Early life ==
Törnqvist was born in 1953, in Stockholm, Sweden. He has a degree from Stockholm University.

== Career ==
Törnqvist co-founded Gunvor in 1997 and is its CEO. Since its founding, Gunvor has grown to become one of the largest crude oil traders in the world.

In 2016, he reduced his stake in Gunvor from 78% to 70%, and received a special dividend of about $1 billion, part of which went to repay his co-founder Gennady Timchenko, who sold his 44% to Törnqvist in March 2014, a day before Timchenko was sanctioned by the US for his "close ties to Vladimir Putin".

== Philanthropy ==
Since 2000, Gunvor has allocated a percentage of its profits towards charity through the Gunvor Foundation.

== Sailing ==
Törnqvist is a keen sailor, and the head of Artemis Racing, which has competed in the America's Cup. He played a key role in Sweden's return to the sport.

== Personal life ==
Törnqvist lives in Geneva, Switzerland.

His first wife was Eva Birgitta Törnqvist. His second wife is Natalia Törnqvist.
