= Assassination attempts on Volodymyr Zelenskyy =

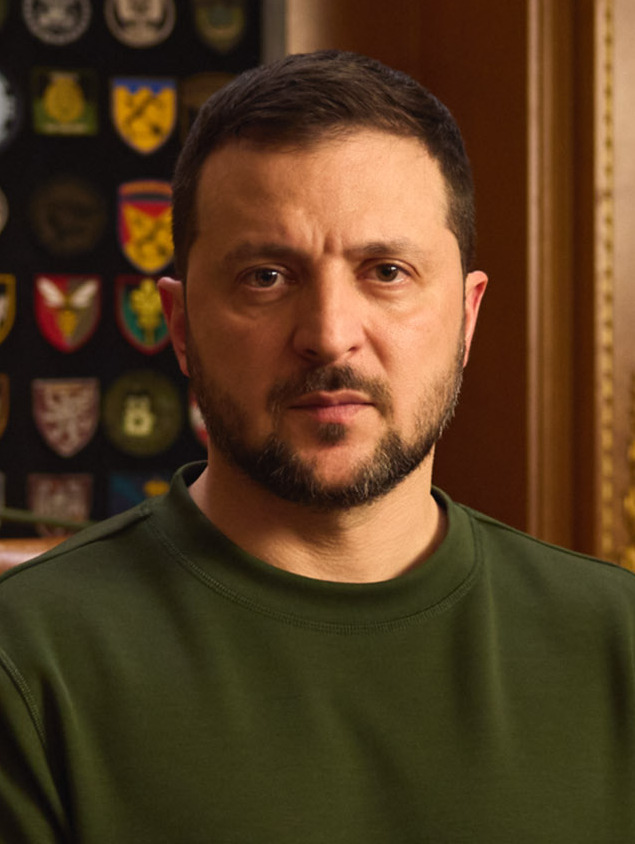
Ukrainian president Volodymyr Zelenskyy in December 2023.

According to Ukrainian government officials and news sources, President of Ukraine Volodymyr Zelenskyy has survived dozens of assassination and kidnapping attempts by Russian or pro-Russian agents during the Russo-Ukrainian war, including at least three that were foiled by Ukrainian security services.

== Background ==
According to Ukrainian presidential adviser Mykhailo Podolyak, Russia planned to achieve a quick victory during the invasion by sending groups into the Ukrainian capital, Kyiv, to eliminate Ukraine's leadership. He stated that "Russia's key intention [was] to remove the country's top leadership, create maximum panic, and try to establish its own puppet government".

== Attempts ==
=== 2022 ===
According to the Ukrainian government, in early February 2022, Russian president Vladimir Putin instructed Chechen leader Ramzan Kadyrov to eliminate Ukrainian leaders. In early March, Ukraine intelligence said that Chechen commandos sent to assassinate Zelenskyy had been "eliminated", with help from FSB agents sympathetic to Ukraine.

In February 2022, Redut PMC was ordered on a covert mission in the Kyiv region to infiltrate and eliminate the political leadership and the Ukrainian Secret Service, by storming those institutions. More than one thousand fighters entered the Kyiv region for this purpose, however the mission failed due to the Ukrainian government having prior intel regarding the plan, resulting in Redut losing up to 90% of their fighting force.

In addition, on Saturday, 26 February 2022, an assassination attempt by a group of Chechen mercenaries was prevented on the outskirts of Kyiv with the would-be assassins killed.

More than 400 Russian mercenaries from the Wagner Group were reported to have been in Kyiv by late February 2022, with orders to assassinate Zelenskyy and destabilise the government enough for Russia to take control.

Zelenskyy subsequently reported that, during one attempt on his life in 2022, "people were killed inside the presidential office", but did not further describe the attack or whether those killed were Ukrainian security forces and/or would-be assassins.

=== 2023 ===
In August 2023, it was reported that another assassination attempt had been stopped after Ukraine's security service arrested a woman who was suspected of gathering information on Zelenskyy's trip to the Mykolaiv Oblast.

=== 2024 ===
In April 2024, a man was arrested in Poland and was allegedly tasked with collecting information about Rzeszow-Jasionka Airport, which is used by Zelenskyy, alongside possible aid towards Russian intelligence services on an assassination of him. Vasyl Malyuk, the head of the SBU, reported that the Polish man had been a Russian sleeper agent since the Soviet era, and activated by the FSB with the task of assassinating Zelenskyy, using either a first-person view drone or a sniper rifle at Rzeszow-Jasionka Airport. Polish officials confirmed that the Pole, referred to as "Paweł K.", had been arrested in connection with the plot in April 2024 and indicted in May 2025.

In May 2024, two Ukrainian colonels were arrested for treason in an alleged plot by the FSB to create a network of agents in an attempt to subdue those close to Zelenskyy and eventually take hostage and kill the President. The arrested colonels were members of the State Security Administration, and three FSB members—Maxim Mishustin, Dmytro Perlin and Oleksiy Korne—were identified as those formulating the plot. Kyrylo Budanov, a Ukrainian general, was reported to be the first to be assassinated in the plan, originally to be carried out prior to Orthodox Easter Sunday on May 5; the FSB plot allegedly called for hitting Budanov's house with a missile, finishing off any survivors with drones, and then firing another missile to destroy evidence of the drones.

== Number of attempts ==
During the conflict there were conflicting accounts of the number of assassination attempts made against Zelenskyy. Presidential adviser Mykhailo Podolyak referenced the issue while speaking to the Ukrainska Pravda news outlet, saying, "Our foreign partners are talking about two or three attempts. I believe that there were more than a dozen attempts".

In early March 2022, the head of Ukraine's National Security Council, Oleksiy Danilov, said that Zelenskyy had survived three assassination attempts in one week. Danilov credited the aid of anti-war intelligence officers within Russia's FSB, who shared information with Ukrainian forces about the planned attacks by two groups of assassins from Chechnya.

== Response ==
During an interview with CBS News on 6 March 2022, U.S. secretary of state Antony Blinken said that the Ukrainian government had prepared for the potential death of Zelenskyy in the invasion, but would not disclose additional details.

== See also ==
- 2022 Ukrainian coup d'état attempt
- Suspicious deaths of Russian businesspeople since 2022
