= Centalion =

Cypriot-registered Swiss commodity trading company

Centalion Group
- Logo for Gunvor Group
- Type: Private
- Industry: Commodity
- Founded: 2000
- Founders: Gennady Timchenko; Torbjörn Törnqvist
- Headquarters: Geneva, Switzerland (head office); Nicosia, Cyprus (registered office)
- Area served: Global
- Key people: Torbjörn Törnqvist (co-founder, majority shareholder until 2025); Gary Pedersen (CEO)
- Services: Energy trading, raw materials
- Revenue: US$144 billion (FY2025)
- Net income: US$567 million (FY2025)
- Total equity: US$5 billion (FY2025)
- Owner: Employees (100%) (FY2025)
- Number of employees: 2,000 (FY2025)
- Website: gunvorgroup.com

Centalion Group Ltd, formerly Gunvor Group, is a multinational energy commodities trading company registered in Cyprus, with its main trading office in Geneva, Switzerland. Centalion also has trading offices in Singapore, Houston, Stamford, London, Calgary, and Dubai, with a network of representative offices around the globe. The company operates in the trade, transport, storage and optimisation of petroleum and other energy products, as well as having investments in oil terminal and port facilities. Its operations consist of securing crude oil and petroleum products upstream and delivering it to market via pipelines and tankers. Gunvor has a separate company, Nyera, set up in 2021 to invest in renewable energy sources.

The company, which was founded in 2000, is the fourth largest crude oil trader in the world after Glencore, Vitol and Trafigura.

Today, Centalion originates most of its crude oil from the Americas. It also trades African, Asian, and South-American oil products and is active on all continents. The company has stopped trading Russian crude oil, and only transacts "very small volumes of Russian oil products, a few tens of thousands of tonnes" that are compliant with international economic sanctions. Natural gas and liquefied natural gas (LNG) accounted for 44% of the firm's traded volumes in 2021.

== Early years ==
Gennady Timchenko and Torbjörn Törnqvist, two oil traders, began working together in 1997, and in 2000 formalised Gunvor, which is named after Törnqvist's mother’s middle name. In 2003, the company started operations in Geneva.

According to the Financial Times, until 2007 the company was a "niche player" focused on exporting Russian oil through Estonia, relying on the expertise of its two founders in the oil business, Russian market and transit logistics. Torbjörn Törnqvist is a Swedish citizen born in 1953. He has traded oil across the world for over twenty years, beginning his career at BP. Gennady Timchenko is a citizen of Russia, Finland, and Armenia born in the Soviet Union in 1952. He has more than 20 years experience in the oil industry, beginning with the Kirishi refinery during perestroika, and was one of the first Russians to export oil to Europe after the Soviet Union collapsed.

In 2007, Centalion's turnover was US$43 billion, with exports of 83 million tons of oil and petroleum products (up from 60 million tons in 2006). In 2010, the company's turnover grew to US$65 billion, up from US$53 billion in 2009, with volumes increasing to 104 million tons.

== Logistics and infrastructures ==
Centalion has invested in oil storages facilities, refineries, port facilities and terminals, therefore ensuring a "comparative advantage over their competitors", according to Törnqvist interviewed by the Financial Times. According to the company website, Centalion owns its own shipping company, Clearlake Shipping Ltd, which shipped 30% of the Baltic crude oil (20.5 million tonnes) in 2006.

According to Nefte Compass, from February 2002 to February 2008, Russian oil exports through Centalion increased sixteen times. The company controls 60% of the volume transiting through Estonia, and 41% of that transit via the port of Primorsk, Leningrad Oblast.

In 2009, Centalion made major investments into physical assets such as oil terminals and facilities, the largest being into its oil export terminal in the port of Ust-Luga on the Baltic Sea, outside of St-Petersburg. In September 2009, the terminal was sold to Transneft.

In September 2009, Centalion made its first direct investment in oil exploration when it purchased a 30% interest in Lagansky block in the Caspian Sea from Lundin Petroleum. The field has proven reserves of over 230 million barrels of oil.

Centalion also owns two major European refineries which are based in the Netherlands and Germany. The Gunvor Petroleum Rotterdam refinery can process 88,000 barrels per day, while the Ingolstadt refinery located in Bavaria can handle 110,000 barrels per day and is supplied by the Transalpine Pipeline from the marine shipping terminal in Trieste, Italy.

In 2021, the American chemical company Dow announced a plastics recycling program in partnership with Centalion's Rotterdam refining operation.

== Expansion ==
Centalion has expanded beyond its Russian roots, and trades globally, including in the Middle East, Asia, Africa and the Americas with its main trading hubs located in Geneva, Singapore, Nassau and Dubai. The group has also opened offices in Amsterdam, Moscow, Beijing and Nigeria. Centalion has stated that it intends to develop its new energy trading division so that it will become a more significant part of a more diversified business.

In 2009, Centalion established its Global Energy division, focused on trading a broad range of energy commodities including Global Coal and Freight, Emissions and Renewables, Natural Gas and LNG and Power.

Marking a new phase in its expansion into the European energy markets, Centalion entered its first trades in the natural gas, power and carbon markets in January 2010, and extending its trading capability across North West and Central Europe for physical natural gas and coal across the globe.

In April 2010, the company hired traders who take responsibility for Centalion's physical-gas positions across continental Europe, D. Smith for as a coal trader in 2010, and Fredrik Bodecke who will be responsible for the Nordic and Baltic electricity markets.

In September 2023, it was announced that Centalion would enter the metals trade again with the hiring of a veteran trader. In December 2023, Gunvor acquired a 75% stake in a 785 megawatt power plant in Bilbao, Spain, from BP Gas Marketing Limited. In August 2024, it was announced that TotalEnergies had sold a 50% stake in Total PARCO Pakistan Limited, an oil marketing firm, to Gunvor Group. It was a joint venture between Total Energies and Pak-Arab Refinery Limited in Pakistan, with a retail network of more than 800 service stations.

In 2025, Centalion made an offer to acquire Lukoil’s international assets, including oil refineries in Romania and Bulgaria, petrol stations in Europe and the United States, and oil and gas operations in the Middle East, Central Asia, and Africa. The proposed purchase came after US sanctions were imposed on Lukoil and other Russian oil companies. In November 2025, Centalion withdrew its bid after the US Treasury announced that it would block the deal, describing the company as a “Kremlin’s puppet” and stating that no licence would be issued while Russia’s invasion of Ukraine continued. Gunvor rejected the allegations as “fundamentally misinformed and false,” emphasising that it had sold its Russian assets more than a decade earlier and had publicly condemned the invasion.

== Ownership ==
Centalion is 100% owned by a partnership of more than 90 employees, following a management buyout on 1 December 2025. Törnqvist, who previously held approximately 86% of the company's shares since 2014, sold out entirely.

Prior to 2014, it was said that its two co-founders held an equal number of shares, with the balance being held in an employee benefit trust for senior management. On 20 March 2014 Timchenko was included on the United States' Sanctions list in the wake of the annexation of Crimea by Russia, due to his close ties with Russian President Vladimir Putin. The US Treasury alleged that via Timchenko "Putin has investments in Gunvor and may have access to Gunvor funds," without providing any evidence. Törnqvist bought out Timchenko's 43.5% stake and became the nominal owner of an 87% stake in the company on 19 March 2014. Timchenko explained the sale by "anticipating potential economic sanctions" and to "ensure with certainty the continued and uninterrupted operations of Gunvor Group". The value of the transaction was not disclosed.

== Controversies ==
In 2008, The Economist mentioned Timchenko in an article that repeated previously published statements about Timchenko and Gunvor. Both of these parties sued for libel. The Economist withdrew the contested material from its website. The lawsuit was settled in July 2009. The Economist published a correcting statement.

Following the major WikiLeaks release of US State Department cables in November 2010, it was reported by the London Daily Telegraph that the wealth of the then Russian Prime Minister Vladimir Putin was linked to a "secretive Swiss-based oil trading firm" called Gunvor. It said that John Beyrle, the United States ambassador to the Russian Federation stated that close connections existed between Gunvor and the Russian Government. Gunvor stated in response to the WikiLeaks disclosure that Timchenko and Törnqvist owned "a large majority of Gunvor" and that a "minority stake is owned by an employee benefit trust". It went on to say that "the company had taken out credit facilities which require full disclosure of company ownership".

In 2017, a Swedish Radio documentary presented evidence that Gunvor had been involved in a Belarusian oil smuggling scheme featuring corruption at the highest levels in the Belarus government. This documentary won the 2017 Prix Europa award in the "Radio Current Affairs" category. Gunvor denied any wrongdoing.

In March 2020, The Sunday Times published an article based on a 2015 interview with Sergei Pugachev, once known as Kremlin's banker, linking Gunvor to Russian President Vladimir Putin.

In 2019, Gunvor "was condemned by Swiss authorities to pay approximately US$96.7 million for failing to put adequate measures in place to prevent the bribery of foreign government officials in Cote d’Ivoire and the Republic of Congo in exchange for lucrative oil deals." In 2021 Transparency International included this as one of five examples of foreign bribery in "clean" countries in the Corruption Perception Index. Then again in 2024, the Swiss attorney general office convicted Gunvor for corruption in Ecuador.

In March 2024, Gunvor resolved investigations by authorities in the US and Switzerland into past activities in Ecuador. Gunvor accepted responsibility for the actions of certain of its former agents and employees, all of whom Gunvor stopped working with years ago and before it learned of the US investigation. Gunvor agreed to pay approximately $374 million in fines and $287 million in forfeiture. The judge in the case said he was “happy to see this chapter has ended” and that he looked “forward to Gunvor’s continued participation in the market.”
