= Potok (PMC) =

Russian private military company

- Поток
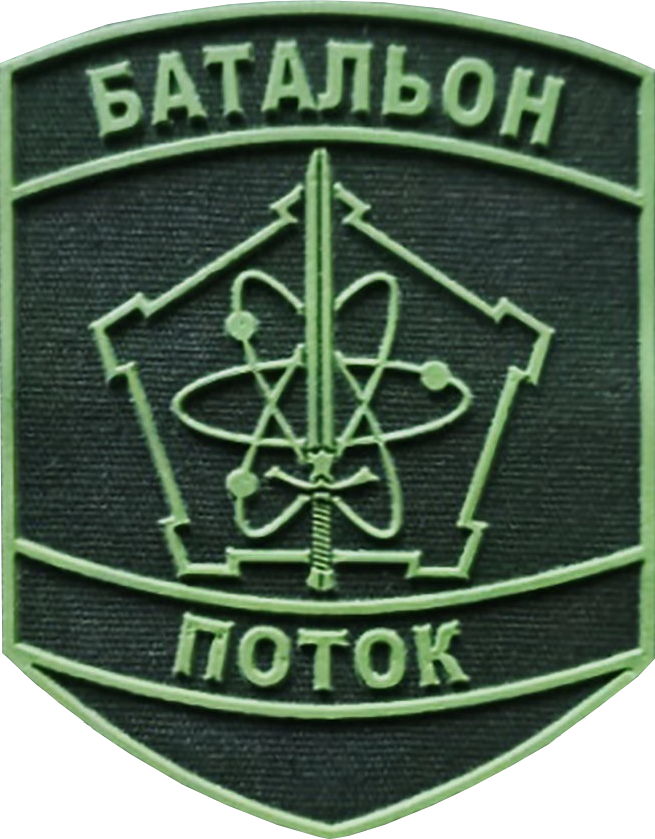
- Active: August 2022 — present
- Country: Russia
- Branch: Russian Ground Forces
- Type: Infantry
- Part of: Redut
- Engagements: Russian invasion of Ukraine

“Potok” is a volunteer battalion or PMC (Private Military Company), which is participating in Russia's invasion of Ukraine. According to an investigation by BBC News, Financial Times and other media, "Potok" is associated with Gazprom and integrated in GRU's Redut. Like most other PMCs, it is part of the Russian Armed Forces.

In addition to Potok, two other PMCs fighting in Ukraine are associated with Gazprom: Fakel and Redut PMC. It is known that Potok joined Redut, a PMC which is also controlled by the Russian MoD.

"Potok" is composed of security officers from the Gazprom corporation, and is assigned to BARS. It is believed that the discipline in "Potok" is less strict than in other parts. Recruitment for Potok and Fakel began in August 2022. Gazprom recruited mainly security guards and other low-skilled employees of state-owned companies, promising attractive conditions of service.

"Potok" took part in the battles near Bakhmut, taking over some of "Wagner's" positions, but abandoned them due to poor preparation and supplies. According to Yevgeny Prigozhin, Gazprom created its own PMC "in order to dilute the Wagner PMC". They were last seen on 17 July 2023 from Yakolivka to Krasnopolivka near Bakhmut.
