= Russian irregular units in Ukraine =

Aspect of the Russian invasion of Ukraine

Over the course of the Russian invasion of Ukraine, which began in February 2022, irregular military units began to play a more prominent role in the fighting, alongside the regular Russian Armed Forces. In the face of waning recruitment levels for the military as casualties mounted, the Russian government increasingly turned to a variety of mercenaries, militias, paramilitaries, and mobilized convicts. In a similar fashion to the pro-Russian people's militias in Ukraine such as the DPR People's Militia and LPR People's Militia, the combat effectiveness of these irregular combatants varies greatly, as demonstrated in the contrast between the poorly equipped and virtually untrained prisoners serving under Storm-Z and the professional mercenaries of PMC Wagner. The Wagner group itself also used convicts in its ranks, alongside its more experienced cadre of fighters. The organization garnered much notoriety as it took up an increasingly prominent role in the fighting in late 2022, culminating in the Battle of Bakhmut.

== Background ==
Russia's invasion effort has created a military in need for volunteers. As a result, Russia has employed a number of tactics to garner more recruits. The largest is to have Russian companies and organizations that are directly or indirectly tied to the Russian government to raise mercenary groups. The basis of these formations is that the higher pay and more stringent recruitment methods will garner more interest and volunteers from civilians, mainly veterans, who have not already joined the war effort. Similarly, many of Russia's subdivisions are paid by the government to raise volunteer militias, usually consisting of between 200 and 400 personnel. These units are largely former veterans, mostly of the Soviet–Afghan War and are between the ages of 50 and 60. However, this is not always the case, as the key driver for recruitment to these units is the higher pay they offer than a mobilized conscript, and the cult of personality around the politicians that created the units. In 2015 Russia created the Combat Army Reserves (BARS) in an attempt to create an analogous reservist organization to the British Territorial Army or the United States Army Reserve with members being paid a salary to undergo part time military training. Additionally, most of the members of BARS units are retained veterans from the War in Donbass.

== Private military companies ==
=== Gazprom-affiliated companies ===
Fakel, Plamya and Potok are voluntary military formations, founded in 2023 by the Russian state run gas monopoly Gazprom subsidiary Gazprom Neft, as a more loyal alternative for the Wagner Group, which at the time had just begun clashing with Russian high command on issues of supplies and tactics. Fakel and Plamya reportedly are directly subordinate to the Russian Ministry of Defence, while Potok joined Redut PMC, a PMC which is also controlled by the Russian MoD. Although the company has no official political affiliation, several members stated they are fighting to restore the Russian Empire. The company hires primarily from Gazprom employees, who are promised that their old jobs are guaranteed for them when they return, and a large portion of the fighters are Gazprom security guards.

The Alexander Nevsky private army is also affiliated with Gazprom.

=== Tsar's Wolves ===
The Tsar's Wolves (Russian: Царские волки) was formed in 2014 during the War in Donbas as a way to circumvent Russia sending assistance to Russian separatist forces. The group consists of "experienced military advisers and experts" that provided "military-technical support" to the separatist forces. On November 11, 2022, former Roscosmos director Dmitry Rogozin announced that he was the new leader of the group shortly after his ousting from the agency. The unit works closely with the Russian Military–industrial complex to develop and test new technology in a "baptism of fire in the Donbas." The group's self stated goal is to restore the glory, and the borders, of the Russian Empire. The group has seen front-line combat during the 2023 Ukrainian counteroffensive where they performed a failed defensive action against the Ukrainian 47th Mechanized Brigade over the village of Lobkove.

=== Uran ===
The Uran (Уран) battalion is a PMC owned and operated by the Russian space agency, Roscosmos, and received international attention on June 16, 2023, when the agency released a recruitment video for the group styled like a trailer to a First-person shooter. The unit is named after the planet Uranus and has put an emphasis on their loyalty to the Russian state in an attempt to sway Wagner group fighters to join them after the Wagner Group rebellion. Mercenaries in the battalion receive a signing bonus of $1,200 and a monthly salary of $3,000. The group has ties to a Moscow based MMA club, and the Shield and Sword patriotic and veteran organization.. Its existence, and Roscomos' active recruitment for the group, has strained international space cooperation, namely with NASA and the policy of Russian membership in the International Space Station. The group has put an emphasis on recruiting from the 170,000 employees of Roscosmos, with their recruitment videos playing throughout Roscosmos installations. In 2025, Dmitry Bakanov, the director of Roscosmos reported that 105 employees had died in combat missions.

=== Redut PMC ===
Redut PMC is a Russian Private Military and Security Company (PMSC) that is part of the "Antiterror-family"—which consists of similarly named PMSCs that protect commercial operations of Russian companies. It is deployed in the Russian invasion and was deployed in the Balkans, Africa, Middle East, Southeast Asia and the Caribbean.

=== Wagner Group ===
The Wagner Group, also known as PMC Wagner, a Russian paramilitary organization also described as a private military company (PMC), a network of mercenaries, and a de facto unit of the Russian Ministry of Defence (MoD) or Russia's military intelligence agency, the GRU, has conducted operations in Ukraine since early 2014.

=== Patriot ===
Created as a more "specialized" alternative to Wagner, Patriot has modeled itself after the American Blackwater PMC by hiring only young ex-military paid $2,500. Founded and led by former Colonel General Leonid Ivashov who also leads the Honor and Motherland patriotic organization and is a chairman of the All-Russian Officers' Assembly. The unit has seen combat around Vuhledar, but have also been sent to Sudan, Gabon, and the Central African Republic.

=== E.N.O.T. ===
A collection of far-right, ultra-nationalist guns for hire active from 2014 until its founder, Igor Mangushev, was killed in Ukraine in 2023.

=== Minor PMCs ===
- The Orthodox Brotherhood is a mercenary group linked to the Russian Orthodox Church. They describe their motivation for fighting "to protect [Christian] Russia from a decadent West that has hijacked Kyiv".
- "Konvoy" (Note: Also translated as "Konvoi" or "Convoy") is the name of two identical organizations founded by the St. Petersburg City Cossack Society in 2022, and are led and managed by Konstantin "Mazai" Pikalov, a former member of the Wagner group and the Crimea militia as well was a close personal ally of Yevgeny Prigozhin. Numbering 300 fighters, each member is paid $2,500 a month and is promised land in Crimea and Abkhazia.
- The "Ural" PMC was founded and led by Igor Altushkin, a Russian oligarch. As its name suggests, the group is reportedly composed of volunteers from the Urals. According to Russian state media, the company has fought near Kreminna. Reportedly, at one point Altushkin attempted to recruit from Russian prisons, but was blocked from doing so by Yevgeny Prigozhin of the Wagner Group.
- PMC "Bokarev" (or "Bokareva") is a private military company that was likely founded and operated by Russian billionaire oligarch Andrei Bokarev. The PMC was first mentioned in April 2023 by Yevgeny Prigozhin. Little else is known about the unit or their operations.
- "Sparta" and "Demon" are two other private military companies.
- "Cascade" is founded and led by prominent Anti-Maidan oligarch Dmitry Sablin. the unit is named after an operational-reconnaissance combat detachment from the Soviet–Afghan War. Six members of the State Duma from United Russia claimed to be members of the group including: Dmitry Khubezov, Sergei Sokol, Oleg Golikov, Oleg Kolesnikov, and Evgeny Pervyshov.

== Militias ==
=== Storm Ossetia ===
Storm Ossetia was a militia in service to the Russian Armed Forces raised from volunteers from North Ossetia–Alania. Consisting of 300 personnel, the unit saw combat near Lobkove during the 2023 Ukrainian counteroffensive, forming a first line of defense for the Russian units there. The defense of the village would fail, with it being occupied by Ukrainian forces on June 13. The unit was then tasked with defending the village of Piatykhatky just south of Lobkove. They were able to hold onto the village for five days until their position became untenable and they were ordered to retreat. During the chaos of the retreat the unit would find themselves encircled and were "liquidated" to the last fighter, including their deputy commander Aivengo Tekho.

=== Pavel Sudoplatov Battalion ===
Raised by pro-Russian collaborators in Russian occupied Zaporizhzhia Oblast, the unit is named after Pavel Sudoplatov, a member of the NKVD from Melitopol that assassinated the leader of the Organisation of Ukrainian Nationalists, Yevhen Konovalets, was involved in the assassination of Leon Trotsky and performed espionage on the Manhattan Project. The battalion was raised in 2022, and is led by Yevgeny Balitsky, the Russian installed governor of Zaporizhzhia, with his son being a prominent member of the battalion. Volunteers for the battalion are paid $5,000 and the group claims to have volunteers from Serbia, North Macedonia, and Turkey.

=== Akhmat battalions ===
On 26 June 2022, Ramzan Kadyrov, leader of the Chechen Republic of Russia, announced the creation of four "Akhmat" military battalions. He claimed this would help reduce unemployment in the republic.

On 28 October 2023, commander of the Akhmat forces Apti Alaudinov confirmed that former Wagner Group fighters were being recruited into the Akhmat units. In an interview, he said that the number of recruits was "massive", and that the former Wagnerites were serving under their former Wagner commanders.

Sever-Akhmat

78th Special Purpose Motorized Regiment "Sever-Akhmat" named after Hero of the Russian Federation A. A. Kadyrov
- 78-й моторизованный полк специального назначения «Север-Ахмат»
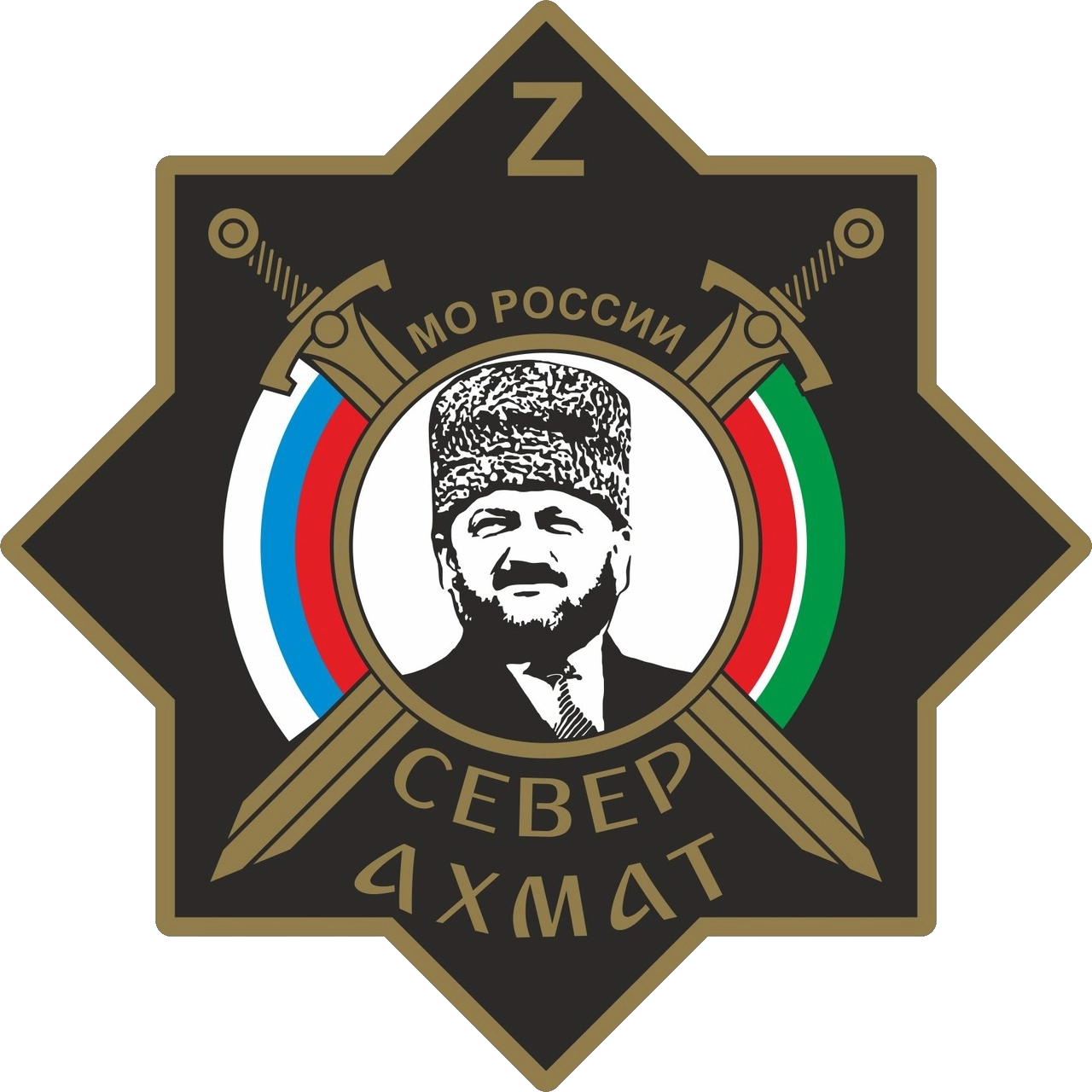
- Active: September 2022–present
- Country: Russia
- Part of: 42nd Guards Motor Rifle Division
- Patron: Akhmat Kadyrov
- Engagements: Russo-Ukrainian war: Russian Invasion of Ukraine; Battle of Chasiv Yar

Commanders
- Current commander: Zaindi Zingiev
- Deputy commander: Khasan Mudiev

Sever-Akhmat (North-Akhmat) is one of the four volunteer "elite special forces" Akhmat units raised by Ramzan Kadyrov on 26 June 2022 that has seen combat in Ukraine. In May 2023, Kadyrov claimed that Sever Akhmat had taken over Wagner Group positions in Bakhmut, taking over their role in the Battle of Bakhmut. Prior to this, earlier in May, the unit was reported as performing rear-guard policing operations behind Russian lines. Adam Delimkhanov claimed that the unit saw combat around Marinka and were being commanded by Apti Alaudinov. Russian state news agency TASS reported that the unit captured Ukrainian positions in the village of Novomykhailivka in the Donetsk Oblast on 26 January 2023. In late May 2023, it was reported that Sever-Akhmat soldiers were involved in a prisoner exchange with Ukraine for members of the Azov Brigade captured at the Azovstal. On 30 July 2023, Kadyrov reprimanded journalists who reported "mass deaths" within the unit, insisting that the unit is still fully functional and seeing active combat in the battle for Bakhmut.

Yug-Akhmat

Yug-Akhmat (South-Akhmat) is one of the four volunteer "elite special forces" Akhmat units raised by Ramzan Kadyrov on 26 June. Kadyrov claimed the unit was trained by the Spetnaz at the Russian Special Forces University and had been sent to the front on 19 September 2022. On 19 May 2023, the unit was reported to have been transferred to the Zaporizhzhia front.

Vostok-Akhmat

Vostok-Akhmat (East-Akhmat) is one of the four volunteer "elite special forces" Akhmat units raised by Ramzan Kadyrov on 29 June. Russian state news agency TASS reported that the unit was sent to the front on 17 September 2022. Kadyrov claimed that the unit destroyed a Leopard 2 tank on 8 July 2023. Kadyrov also claimed that the unit might be sent to defend the southern border of Chechnya, in an interview where he was questioned for ordering the installation of air defense in the region. In June, Kadyrov announced that the unit's barracks in Chechnya would double as a patriotic youth center. On 15 August it was reported that the unit is subordinate to the 42nd Guards Motor Rifle Division and has been sent to Southern Ukraine as part of the 2023 Ukrainian counteroffensive to defend Russian positions south of Orikhiv.

Zapad-Akhmat

Zapad-Akhmat (West-Akhmat) is one of the four volunteer "elite special forces" Akhmat units raised by Ramzan Kadyrov on 26 June 2022. Russian state news agency TASS reported that the unit was sent to the front on 17 September 2022, and are commanded by Ismail Aguyev who had served for other units prior to his command of the unit. The unit was sent to the Belgorod Oblast to defend against incursions there by anti-government Russian militant groups.

=== Bashkortostan Regiment ===
Numbering nearly 2,500 personnel, Bashkortostan's government has reorganized their volunteer units to have a new central command, after a lack of success of sending their four battalion sized units into combat independently. This new unified regiment has 12 volunteer units under its command and completed training on 15 August and were sent to the front in Southern Ukraine.

Shaimuratov Battalion

A volunteer unit from Bashkortostan formed by the "Veterans of the Marine Corps and Special Forces of the Navy", a veterans fraternal organization, at the end of May 2022. The unit was reported to consist of 250 men who are paid $3,775 monthly. Veterans of the unit reported that they had been sent to Ukraine with little training, and suffered from logistical issues and a near constant lack of supplies. Their supply situation was so bad, in fact, that they had to forage for their own ammunition, either bartering with other units, or scavenging from the dead where they were deployed. After just a couple of weeks of combat, dozens of members of the unit renounced their contracts and demanded to be sent home to Bashkortostan. Additionally, veterans reported that calls for counter strikes, air support or artillery support, were never answered, with the unit being left to fend for itself against Ukrainian strikes. The unit was subjected to lectures by a political officer, who was compared to a soviet era politruk, and were transferred to the Kherson front and later sent to Crimea. There they were housed in a 25-square-meter garage alongside arrested servicemen who were caught being drunk on the job or breaking curfew, the unit submitted an appeal to Alik Kamaletdinov, the aide in Bashkortostan's government in charge of the mobilization, but he did not respond. The Institute for the Study of War reported that the unit was deployed to the front from August 25 to 27, and on the 26 received blessings from members of the Russian Orthodox Church. They also reported that when volunteers contracts expired, they were denied being sent home, instead being pressed into further service without pay or compensation.

=== Odessa Brigade ===
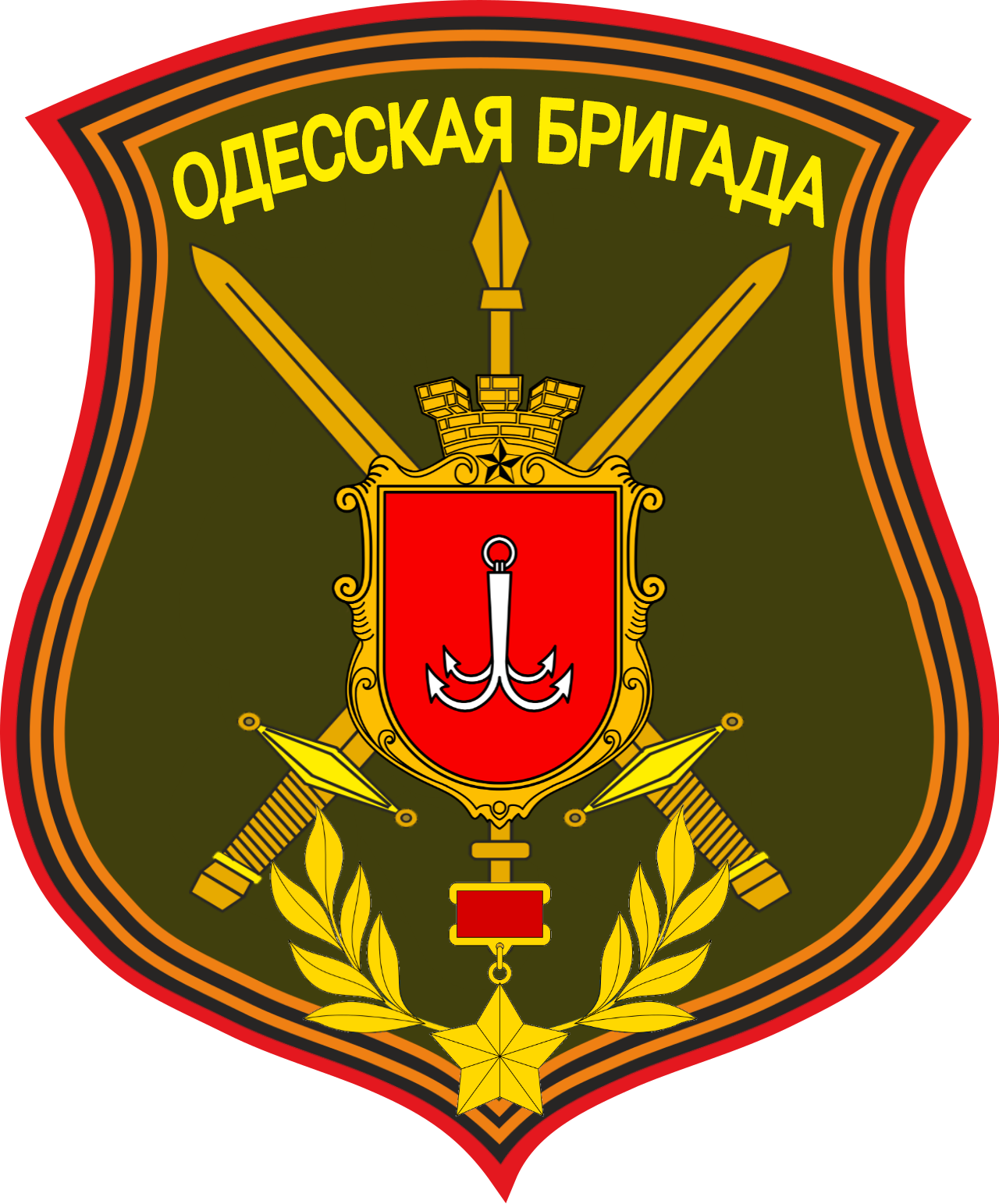
Emblem of the Odessa Brigade

The formation of the "Odessa Brigade" or "Odessa Volunteer Brigade" (Russian: одесской добровольческой бригады) was announced on social media in July 2022, accompanied by claims that Russian forces were still planning to conquer Odesa and Mykolaiv. This unit was led by Ihor Markov, an Odesa native and well-known local collaborator. He claimed that the unit mostly consisted of locals like himself. The Frontier Post characterized the foundation of the new Odessa Brigade alongside other declarations at the time as an attempt by Russian propaganda to distract the public from successful Ukrainian counter-attacks in the region. Ukrainian journalist Lilia Ragutskaya agreed with this assessment, disparagingly calling the unit the "Markov brigade" and its fighters "cannon fodder" for the Russian military. However, she also stated that the unit was better equipped than the militias of the Luhansk and Donetsk People's Republics, suggesting that it had been directly armed by the Russian Ministry of Defence.

The leader of the 2022 Odessa Brigade, Ihor Markov, had been a long-time pro-Russian figure in Odesa and had been suspected of being funded by the Russian government as early as 2009. He had led the "Rodina Party", a local pro-Russian party, and served as Party of Regions member before fleeing into exile in early 2014. From Moscow, he had then played a major role in mobilizing pro-Russian forces during the 2014 Odesa clashes. In the founding video of the 2022 unit, he made statements in line with the Russian narrative that Ukraine is governed by a Nazi regime. Beside his role in the new unit, Markov also repeatedly appeared in Russian propaganda, at one point proposing to make Odesa the new capital of Ukraine.

In May 2023, Ukraine charged Ihor Markov with high treason for his role in setting up the second "Odessa Brigade", spreading pro-Russian propaganda, and recognizing the Russian invasion as being legitimate.

=== Alania Battalion ===
Formed in January 2016 in North Ossetia–Alania, the battalion initially saw combat during the War in Donbas. The Institute for the Study of War reported that it was the first volunteer unit to have seen combat during the Russian invasion of Ukraine. Fidar Khubaev, a blogger who joined the battalion in 2022 defected to Ukraine, and has since successfully applied for asylum in the United States. There he accused the Russian army and its military leaders of corruption and professional failure and said that the Russian army is very poorly armed. Head of North Ossetia–Alania Sergey Menyaylo was personally involved in the unit's creation and visited the unit on the front and reportedly suffered from a concussion. The unit is equipped with at least one T-62 tank. It saw combat alongside Tsar's Wolves, Storm Ossetia, Crimea, and Sarmat around the village of Lobkove.

=== Arbat Battalion ===
"Arbat" Separate Guards Special Purpose Battalion
- Отдельный гвардейский батальон специального назначения «Арбат» Առանձին պահակային հատուկ նշանակության գումարտակ «Արբատ»
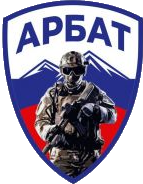
- Active: 2 July 2023–present
- Country: Russia
- Part of: Southern Military District: 51st Combined Arms Army; Pyatnashka Brigade; Redut
- Engagements: Russo-Ukrainian war: Russian Invasion of Ukraine; Battle of Avdiivka; Kursk campaign; 2024 Armenian coup attempt allegations
- Battle honours: Guards

Commanders
- Notable commanders: Armen Sargsyan †; Aik Gasparyan †

Insignia
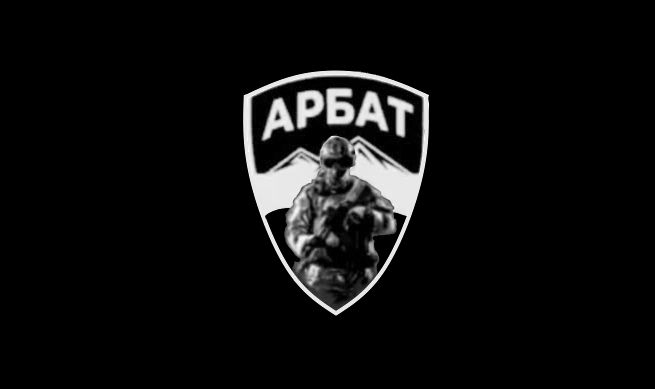
- Identification symbol

The "Arbat" Separate Guards Special Purpose Battalion is a unit of Armenian volunteers that is part of the Russian Armed Forces. The unit has been described as mercenaries and as a paramilitary.

The "Arbat" Battalion was sent to the front on 2 July 2023 after a sendoff ceremony in the Armenian Cathedral of Moscow. They were blessed in a ceremony by clergy. The Ukrainian diocese of the Armenian Apostolic Church condemned the blessing, calling it "unacceptable and reprehensible". Russian milbloggers speculated that the battalion may be made up of Russian Armenians, Abkhazian Armenians, and volunteers from Armenia proper.

On 25 October 2023, an interview was published with the commander of the battalion, who claimed that the unit was part of Donetsk People's Republic formations. He also said that the unit contained a detachment that was composed "almost entirely" of former Wagner Group mercenaries who had signed contracts with the Russian Ministry of Defence. He said that this detachment "sends drone operators, electronic warfare (EW) specialists, and other fighters to other units in different frontline sectors as needed".

The Arbat Battalion has operated primarily in the Avdiivka direction, where they have taken heavy losses.

On September 18, 2024, the Armenian government arrested three individuals and alleged that the battalion, with Russian backing, had attempted to overthrow the Armenian government in a coup.

On February 3, 2025, an explosion at a luxury apartment complex in Moscow killed the battalion's founder Armen Sarkisian. Who was responsible for the attack was unclear.

On February 9, 2026 its commander since 2023, Ayk Gasparyan, was killed in combat, according to the Russian-installed mayor of the occupied Ukrainian city of Horvlinka.

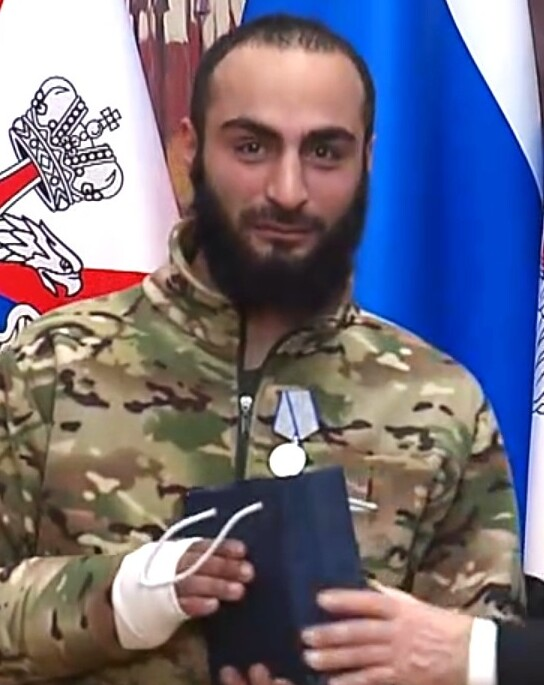
ArBat's former commander Ayk Gasparyan

The Security Service of Ukraine has claimed that all members of the battalion are convicted criminals recruited from Russian prisons from Sarkisian's criminal contacts. The (Former) commander of the battalion, Aik Gasparyan, who was awarded the "for courage" medal, had been sentenced to seven years in a maximum-security prison in 2020 after being convicted of an attempted armed robbery at a Moscow café before being recruited by the battalion.

=== Bogdan Khmelnitsky Battalion ===
The Bogdan Khmelnitsky Battalion (also spelled in a Russian form as Bohdan Khmelnytsky Battalion) is a so-called volunteer battalion of Russia composed of Ukrainian prisoners of war (POWs). Russian state media has claimed that its members are Ukrainian (POWs) who were "recruited" from Russian penal colonies. The Institute for the Study of War has assumed it is likely that Russia has coerced the Ukrainians to join the formation, which violates the Geneva Convention on Prisoners of War, which dictates "no prisoner of war may at any time be sent to or detained in areas where he may be exposed to the fire of the combat zone", and shall not "be employed on labor which is of an unhealthy or dangerous nature". The formation's alleged commander Andrii Tyshchenko told Russian state media that the battalion has "recruited" roughly 70 Ukrainian POWs in February alone. They were reported to have begun training and will begin fighting in "an unspecified area of the front line" when they are done. He said that the "recruits" would obtain Russian citizenship.

=== Sports-related battalions ===
The Hispaniola Battalion (Note: Also translated as "Española Battalion".), part of Redut PMC, was a battalion consisting of former Russian football hooligans. In April 2023, they visited a business college in Russia for a talk. Students asked questions with implications of criticizing the war and pointing out similarities between the skull-and-crossbones patches on the uniforms of the fighters and the Totenkopf of the Nazi German SS. The college administration disciplined five students for asking "inappropriate" questions. The students were expelled after being brutally beaten and arrested by security police. In September 2023, the battalion were claimed to be fighting near Bakhmut.

The Moscow Battalion was created in January 2023 by Russian athletes and sports fans from Moscow with their first spotting on the front coming on 30 September 2023, when they were seen operating in the vicinity of Kreminna as part of the Luhansk Oblast campaign.

=== Minor battalions from Russian federal subjects ===
The Russian federal government launched an effort in July 2022 to have the federal subjects of Russia launch their own volunteer battalions.

In summer 2022, the Republic of Tatarstan formed the "Alga" and "Timer" battalions. The Alga Battalion saw combat in Bakhmut, Pisky and Vuhledar, before being reportedly sent back to Tatarstan due to high casualties in late July/early August 2023. On 17 July 2023, the Republic of Tatarstan reportedly formed three new volunteer battalions. The first was the "Hero of Russia Damir Islamov" Battalion, named after posthumous Hero of Russia Damir Islamov who was killed in 2022 in Ukraine. He was a senior lieutenant of a tank platoon that "demonstrated courage and heroism" when he was killed in action. The second was the "Hero of the Soviet Union Boris Kuznetsov" Battalion, and the third was an unnamed battalion that would only consist of contract soldiers.

From Perm Oblast, there are two battalions. The first is the Parma Battalion, formed on 25 May 2022. Volunteers are paid $5,150 monthly and promised government housing, education grants, and social welfare upon the completion of their service. The second is the Molot Battalion, which was formed on 7 July 2022.

From Chelyabinsk Oblast, there are two battalions as of 15 July 2022: The "Uzhnouralets" Battalion, which consisted of 263 men aged between 21 and 54, and the "Uzhnyi Ural" Battalion, which consisted of 251 men.

The Republic of Chuvashia formed the "Atal" Battalion, a volunteer signals unit with ties to Oleg Nikolayev. Volunteers are paid a cash signing bonus of $3,775.

The Primorsky Krai formed the Tigr Battalion: attached to the 155th Guards Naval Infantry Brigade, the unit was raised in a recruitment drive and is affiliated to the governor Oleg Kozhemyako. Volunteers are paid a monthly salary of $3,430, and mostly consist of older veterans, usually in their 50s or 60s.

Kursk Oblast formed the "Seym" Battalion, a volunteer logistical support battalion with members being paid $3,430 to $8,580 monthly depending on the length of their service.

The Orenburg city council ordered the formation of the "Yaik" Battalion, a volunteer motorized rifle battalion. Members are paid $3,430 a month and must have a clean criminal record.

Moscow City officially funds and hosts the headquarters of the "Sobyaninskiy Polk" Regiment, but most of the Regiments volunteers are recruited from outside of the city, and the Regiments officer corp are largely veterans of the DNR's People's Militias.

Nizhny Novgorod Oblast formed the "Kuzma Minin" Tank Battalion via the Nizhny Novgorod Oblast Russian Union of Afghan Veterans. Its members are paid between $3,775 to $6,000 a month, and most of its members are older veterans.

=== Other ===
In Russian-occupied Kherson Oblast, the "Vasily Margelov" Battalion was raised from collaborationist volunteers. The battalion is named after Red Army general Vasily Margelov, a Belarusian from what is today Dnipro.

The "Vladlen Tatarsky" Battalion was named in honor of the Russian milblogger Vladlen Tatarsky, who had been recently assassinated at the time of their formation. The battalion has seen combat around the town of New York in Donetsk Oblast as part of the Southern Military District, operating UAVs.

The Oplot-1 Battalion was created by the Cossack veterans organization Oplot on 19 August 2023.

== Paramilitary ==
=== Combat Army Reserve ===
The Combat Army Reserves was created by the Ministry of Defence in 2015 as an analogous organization to the British Territorial Army or the United States Army Reserve with members being paid a salary per a three-year or a one-and-a-half-year contract, and participating in at least a month per year of part-time training, with the prospect of being called to active duty in the event of war. In 2021, during the build-up towards the invasion of Ukraine a massive recruitment drive for BARS was undertaken in hopes of having the organization reach 80,000 to 100,000 members. However, at the start of the invasion, all 20 available BARS units were mobilized and sent into combat, numbering 10,000 reservists. The average age for a BARS soldier is 45 and 70% have previously served in the military. BARS soldiers have complained about lack of pay, poor equipment and denial of medical service or military benefits.

=== Rosgvardiya ===
The Rosgvardiya, formally known as the National Guard of the Russian Federation, was established in 2016 via a Presidential Decree (Executive Order) by President Putin. Early in January and February 2022, there were reports of Rosgvardiya detachments moving to the Russia–Ukraine border and Belarus, joining the supposed "training exercise", going during the 2021–2022 Russo-Ukrainian crisis. When Russian forces invaded Ukraine, Rosgvardiya troops started to move into Ukrainian territory, establishing themselves in occupied cities and towns, reportedly for suppressing local hostile population.

The Rosvgardiya has been used to detain Ukrainian protestors and has been accused of firing on unarmed protestors.

== Penal ==
During the Russian invasion of Ukraine, Russia has recruited substantial numbers of prisoners into military units. The Foreign Intelligence Service of Ukraine has claimed that Russia has recruited between 140,000 and 180,000 convicts to fight Ukraine.

The Russian paramilitary Wagner Group widely recruited from prisons starting in 2022, growing their forces by an estimated 40,000. According to The New York Times, Wagner's prison recruitment campaign began in early July 2022, when Prigozhin personally appeared in prisons around St. Petersburg and offered deals to the prisoners. However, the Wagner Group lost access to the prisons in February 2023 amidst schisms with the regular Russian Ministry of Defense. The Russian MoD itself reportedly began recruiting prisoners in October 2022.

In April 2023, information emerged about the creation of the Storm-Z series of units by the MoD. After receiving only ten to fifteen days of training, these units are attached to regular Russian forces suffering from battle fatigue. On 24 June 2023, Vladimir Putin signed a law on the recruitment of convicts to contract service with the Defense Ministry, disbanding Storm-Z and replacing it with the new Storm-V units.

== Bibliography ==
- Mareš, Miroslav; Laryš, Martin; Holzer, Jan (2018). Militant Right-Wing Extremism in Putin's Russia: Legacies, Forms and Threats. Abingdon-on-Thames: Routledge. ISBN 978-1-032-09447-2.

== See also ==
- GRU Volunteer Corps
