= Stroytransgaz =

Russian petroleum, natural gas, & engineering construction company

- Type: Public (OAO)
- Industry: Engineering
- Founded: 1990
- Headquarters: Moscow, Russia
- Key people: Evgeny Bobylev (Chairman); Vladimir Kartashian (CEO)
- Revenue: $624 million (2017)
- Operating income: $126 million (2016)
- Net income: $121 million (2016)
- Website: www.stroytransgaz.com

OAO Stroytransgaz (Russian: Стройтрансгаз) is a Russian engineering construction company in the field of oil and gas industry. The company was founded in 1990. It was originally a subsidiary of Gazprom, but now controlled by Gennady Timchenko though his Volga Group SICAV SIF SA fund.

The company has been added to the Specially Designated Nationals List on the US Department of the Treasury site because of connections to the annexation of Crimea by the Russian Federation.

== Operations ==
The company is involved in the engineering and construction of pipeline systems, oil and gas production facilities, underground gas storages, power stations, as well as civil and industrial structures and facilities. In addition to Russia, the company is active in the CIS countries, in the Middle East, Turkey, India, Algeria, Germany and Greece. It is involved in the construction of the Arab Gas Pipeline, the Taweelah–Fujairah gas pipeline, and the Central Asia–China gas pipeline. The company had major energy and infrastructure projects in Syria before the Syrian civil war.

== Directors ==
CEO - Lebedev Dmitry Vladimirovich (from November 23, 2022)
