= 81st Special Forces Brigade =

81st Special Forces Brigade "Bears"
- 81-я бригада специального назначения «Медведи»
- Founded: 17 March 2023
- Country: Russia
- Allegiance: Russian government
- Type: Paramilitary
- Size: Brigade
- Part of: Redut
- Garrison/HQ: Perevalne, Crimea

81st Special Forces Brigade "Bears" (Russian: 81-я бригада специального назначения «Медведи»), also mentioned by the media as PMC "Bear", (Russian: ЧВК «Медведи») is a Russian elite volunteer military formation highly trained and with combat capabilities similar to the Spetsnaz.

It was created in 2023 to participate in the Russian invasion of Ukraine and support pro-Russian regimes in African countries. It is part of the private military company (PMC) "Redut".

== History ==
The first announcements about the creation of a volunteer battalion called "Bears" appeared on 17 March 2023. As in other units of "Redut", recruits were offered a six-month contract with a monthly salary of 220 thousand rubles. The training base of the unit is located near the military town in the village of Perevalne in Crimea, at the former training ground of the coastal defense forces of the Ukrainian Navy. In early April, the battalion's training ground was visited by the head of the Republic of Crimea, Sergei Aksyonov, and the Deputy Minister of Defense of Russia, Yunus-Bek Yevkurov. The number of fighters at this stage was 400. On May 30, the volunteer battalion, which never managed to take part in combat operations, was named the 81st Special Forces Brigade "Bears".

As of October 2023, the battalion of the 81st brigade was in the Kherson region to respond promptly to raids by Ukrainian Armed Forces units across the Dnieper on the front line between Oleshky and Novaya Kakhovka. The brigade is part of the BEAR expeditionary corps, established to conduct operations on the African continent. At the end of November 2023, the brigade commander Vitaly Yermolaev announced the corps' participation in the fight against jihadists in Burkina Faso. In particular, it was claimed that "Russian specialists" helped repel an attack on the city of Djibo on November 28. However, no evidence of Russian presence in Djibo has been published. According to Le Monde, a hundred brigade fighters arrived in Burkina Faso, in May 2024. On July 25, the head of the Burkinabe junta, Captain Ibrahim Traoré, was filmed in the country's capital, Ouagadougou, surrounded by Russian military formations, at least one of whom was wearing a "BEAR" armband and the corps' emblem. In late August, the corps was withdrawn from Burkina Faso and sent to the Kursk Oblast to counter the Ukrainian army's offensive.
