= Motor Rifle Regiment of the Aerospace Forces =

Military unit of the VKS

Motor Rifle Regiment (Territory Control) of the VKS
- Мотострелковый полк (контроля территории) ВКС
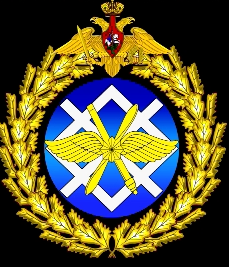
- Regiment insignia
- Active: May 2024 - present
- Country: Russian Federation
- Allegiance: Russian Armed Forces
- Branch: Russian Aerospace Forces
- Type: Motorized infantry
- Role: Light Infantry
- Size: Regiment
- Engagements: Russo-Ukrainian War; Kursk offensive (2024–2025); Battle of Korenevo

Motor Rifle Regiment (Territory Control) of the Aerospace Forces is a motorized infantry regiment created by the Russian Aerospace Forces for the purpose of participating in the Russian invasion of Ukraine. It was most notably deployed to Kursk Oblast in July 2024 and fought during the Kursk campaign.

== History ==
The Regiment was created in May 2024 and was assembled from Aerospace Forces servicemen from different units: security and logistics companies from airfields, cosmodromes, warehouses of the Aerospace Forces and early-warning radar stations, as well as engineers, mechanics and a small number of flight officers. The majority of the servicemen are from security companies of the Aerospace Forces. It was assigned to the so-called border defence grouping of the "North" Group of forces. Infantry arrived in the border areas in mid-July 2024. It appears the unit had a very limited supply of vehicles.

=== Combat action ===
On 7th of August troops from the regiment were urgently transferred to defend Korenevo from a Ukrainian advance. The Regiment's elements fought there for more than a week.

== Composition ==
Among the regiment's units is an artillery battery armed with D-30 howitzers as well as an NBC reconnaissance platoon and UAV units.
