= Gennady Timchenko =

Russian billionaire businessman

- Геннадий Тимченко
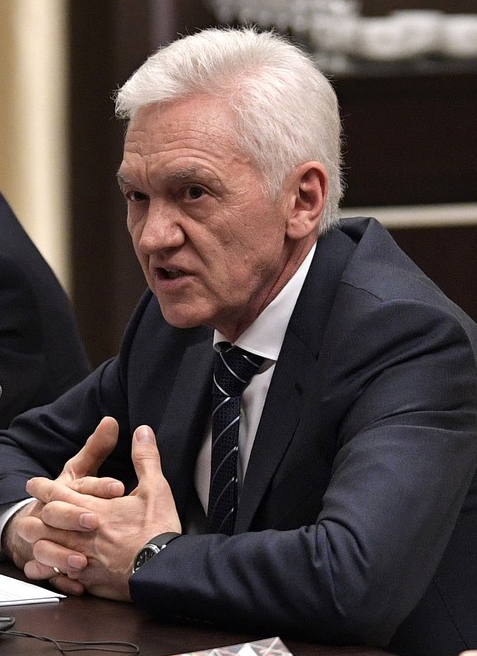
- Timchenko in 2018
- Born: Gennady Nikolayevich Timchenko; 9 November 1952 (age 74); Leninakan, Armenian SSR, Soviet Union (now Gyumri, Armenia)
- Citizenship: Russia; Finland; Armenia
- Occupation: Businessman
- Spouse: Elena
- Children: 5
- Awards: Legion of Honour (Chevalier)

Gennady Nikolayevich Timchenko (Russian: Геннадий Николаевич Тимченко, also spelled Guennadi Timtchenko; born 9 November 1952) is a Russian oligarch and billionaire businessman. He founded and owns the private investment firm Volga Group. He was previously a co-owner of Gunvor Group.

Timchenko has been close friends with Russian leader Vladimir Putin since the early 1990s. In 1991, Putin gave Timchenko an oil export license. Timchenko then founded Gunvor, which has now exported billions of dollars' worth of Russian oil.

Timchenko's investment firm Volga Group owns a large stake of shares of the natural gas giant Novatek. The Pandora Papers leaks revealed that a Timchenko firm, which played a key role in the Novatek investment, obtained massive loans through anonymous offshore shell companies. Timchenko was sanctioned by the US over Russia's 2014 annexation of Crimea. He was about to be sanctioned further by the government of the United Kingdom just before the Russian invasion of Ukraine in February 2022.

As of March 2022, Timchenko was 205th on the Bloomberg Billionaires Index, with an estimated fortune of US $10.3 billion; he is the sixth richest person in Russia. He is known for being the Chairman of the Board of Directors of the Kontinental Hockey League, and President of the SKA Saint Petersburg ice hockey club. He is a citizen of Russia, Finland, and Armenia.

== Early life and education ==
Timchenko was born in Leninakan, Armenian SSR, Soviet Union (now Gyumri, Armenia), in 1952. His father was in the Soviet military and served in the Second World War. He lived for six years of his childhood (from 1959 to 1965) in the German Democratic Republic (learning to speak German) and in the Ukrainian SSR. In 1976, he graduated from the Mechanical Institute of Saint Petersburg, then named Leningrad, as an electrical engineer, according to a 2008 interview with the Wall Street Journal.

== Career ==
In 1977, Timchenko began to work as an engineer for the Izhorsky plant near Saint Petersburg; the plant specialized in building power generators. The state-owned company then moved him to their trade department.

From 1982 to 1988, he worked as a senior engineer with the Ministry of Foreign Trade. In 1988 when Russia started to liberalize its economy, he was promoted to Deputy Director of state-owned oil company Kirishineftekhimexport, which was created in 1987 and based at the Kirishi refinery, one of the three largest refineries in the RSFSR.

In 1991, Timchenko decided to leave Russia and was hired by a Finland-based company, Urals Finland Oy, specializing in importing Russian oil to Europe. He became a Finnish citizen. While Anatoly Sobchak was in exile, Timchenko was the link between Sobchak and Vladimir Putin.

In 1995, Urals Finland Oy was renamed International Petroleum Products Oy (IPP); Timchenko then became deputy and later CEO of IPP OY. (Note: There are two International Petroleum Products (IPP) companies one in Sweden which has AB and one in Finland which has Oy. Both companies have a close relationship with Timchenko and Vadim Evseevich Somov (Russian: Вадим Евсеевич Сомов) who was the general director of OJSC Kirishinefteorgsintez (KINEF or KiNEx) (Russian: ОАО "Киришинефтеоргсинтез" (КИНЕФ Кинэкс (ЗАО))).) In 1997, he co-founded the global commodity trading company Gunvor with Swedish businessman Torbjörn Törnqvist. Timchenko sold his stake to Törnqvist in March 2014, a day before the U.S. sanctions began.

In 2007, Timchenko founded the Volga Group (Volga Resources Group) private investment fund. Volga group holds his Russian and international assets in the energy, transport, infrastructure, financial services and consumer sectors.

=== Redut PMC ===
Redut, also known as Redoubt or Redut-Antiterror and formerly known as "Shield", is a Russian Private Military and Security Company (PMSC) that is part of the "Antiterror-family", which consists of similarly named PMSCs which protect commercial operations of Russian companies. Redut is currently deployed by Russia in the Russian invasion of Ukraine, for which it was sanctioned. Several fighters of the group have been convicted of war crimes during the invasion.

Gennady Timchenko and Oleg Deripaska reportedly are major backers of the company. The PMC received armored personnel carriers, helmets, and protective vests from them.

Redut provided services for Timchenko's companies, including the deployment of snipers, pioneers and guards. Redut formations have been deployed to protect convoys, corporate real estate—including oil production facilities of JSC Stroytransgaz in Syria.

=== Gunvor ===
Timchenko was the co-founder (along with Torbjörn Törnqvist) of the Gunvor Group, a corporation registered in Cyprus; it does business in trading and logistics related to the international energy market. On 19 March 2014, Timchenko sold his stake in Gunvor to the other co-founder, Torbjörn Törnqvist. The sale was made the day before Timchenko was included on the United States sanctions list in the wake of the annexing of Crimea by Russia. Timchenko said he had sold his stake in anticipation of "potential economic sanctions" and to "ensure with certainty the continued and uninterrupted operations of Gunvor Group". The value of the transaction was not disclosed.

=== Volga Group ===
In 2007, Timchenko founded the Luxembourg-based fund Volga Resources. The fund, which consolidates Timchenko's assets, was renamed in June 2013 as Volga Group and introduced at the Saint Petersburg International Economic Forum. He noted that, for the next few years, his group will focus on the development of infrastructure projects in Russia.

The purpose of this fund is "based on direct and indirect investments in value-driven assets in Russia and internationally that produce consistent, long-term returns". The group owns assets in the energy, transportation and infrastructure development, as well as financial services, consumer goods and real estate. Its most notable investments are in gas company Novatek and petrochemical company Sibur.

=== Airfix Aviation ===
In April 2014, Timchenko sold a 49% stake in the Finnish company IPP Oy, which owned 99% of the Finnish aviation company Airfix Aviation. It was a small part of the Volga Group portfolio.

Timchenko was subject to international sanctions after the Russian annexation of Crimea in April 2014. IPP Oil Products (Cyprus), which is closely associated with Timchenko is under sanctions. Kai Paananen (Russian: Кай Паананен), a partner of Timchenko, has close ties to Airfix Aviation and the IPP companies.

Volga Group has been listed by the US Dept of Treasury (OFAC - Office of Foreign Assets Control) as a SDN (specially Designated Nationals) in the Ukraine-related sanction lists of 2014.

=== Sanctions ===
In March 2014, following the Crimean status referendum, the U.S. Treasury put Timchenko on the Specially Designated Nationals List (SDN), a list of individuals sanctioned as "members of the Russian leadership's inner circle." The sanctions freeze any assets he holds in the United States and ban him from entering the U.S. Timchenko is on the list of Russian "oligarchs" named in the CAATSA unclassified report.

On 22 February 2022, the UK government announced sanctions on Timchenko after Russia recognised the independence of the Donetsk and Luhansk people's republics and deployed troops to the republics. On 28 February 2022, in relation to the 2022 Russian invasion of Ukraine, the European Union blacklisted Timchenko and had all his assets frozen. He was sanctioned by Canada under the Special Economic Measures Act (S.C. 1992, c. 17) in relation to the Russian invasion of Ukraine for Grave Breach of International Peace and Security. On March 4, 2022 the Italian police seized his yacht Lena in the port city of Sanremo. The yacht was also placed on a United States sanctions list; his wife and daughter are also named to the sanctions list.

== Personal life and citizenship ==
Timchenko is married to Elena. They have five children. As of March 2014, Timchenko lives in Moscow while his family resides in Switzerland. His daughter Ksenia is married to Gleb Frank, son of Putin's former transport minister Sergey Frank.

In an interview with The Wall Street Journal, Timchenko said that in 1999 he gave up Russian citizenship and became a Finnish citizen.

In 2004, the Helsingin Sanomat wrote that he acquired Finnish citizenship, and that he lived in Geneva at that time. In an October 2012 interview with the Russian edition of Forbes, Timchenko said that he had both Russian and Finnish citizenships. In August 2014, Timchenko said in an interview with ITAR-TASS that he needed Finnish citizenship to travel in the 1990s, when it was harder to travel on a Russian passport, and that he never concealed having two passports. He said over the past fourteen years, he had been paying taxes in Switzerland and prior to that, in Finland. "I scrupulously transfer to Russia the monies I owe to the Russian budget. In theory, I could have cut down the transfers citing the rule on inadmissibility of dual taxation but I never did this–I realized the proceeds that my monies were going off in wages to Russian doctors, teachers, and the military while I was not going to go bankrupt under any circumstances. I wouldn't get poor if I shared the budget with others." The US Department of Treasury announcement of individuals under sanctions due to the annexation of Crimea by the Russian Federation lists him as a citizen of Russia, Finland, and Armenia.

== Wealth ==
According to Forbes magazine, Timchenko is one of the wealthiest people in Russia and the world:

	2008	2009	2010	2011	2012	2013	2014	2016
Wealth ($bn)	2.5	0.4	1.9	5.5	9.1	14.1	15.3	11.7
World Ranking	462	-	536	185	99	62	61	118
Russian ranking	43	98	36	26	12	9	6	

According to the Russian publication RBC, in 2012 Timchenko's worth was estimated at $24.61bn.

In addition to business assets, Timchenko, according to media reports, also owns a property in Geneva, Switzerland, which consists of just over 1 ha of land, an internal area of 341m². According to the Land Registry Office of Geneva, the purchase price of the property was SFR 8.4m (at the time of purchase in 2001 – about US$11m). He purchased the yacht Lena for $18 million in 2009.

His income, according to the Finnish tax authorities, increased tenfold from 1999 to 2001. In 2001, he declared an income of EUR 4.9m. Because of his high taxes, Timchenko moved to Switzerland in 2002.

In June 2022, Forbes estimated his net worth at $23.1 billion, making him the 64th richest individual in the world.

=== Investigation ===
In November 2014, The Wall Street Journal reported that the US Attorney's Office for the Eastern District of New York is examining allegations about transactions in which Gunvor Group bought oil from Russia's OAO Rosneft and sold it to third parties through the US financial system, which could have been illegal. Gunvor released a statement on 6 November denying any crime.

== Public activities and philanthropy ==
In 1998, Timchenko co-founded the Yawara-Neva Judo Club.

In 2007, Timchenko and the company Surgutex founded the Kluch charitable foundation, which develops professional foster homes in Leningrad, Tambov and Ryazan regions. In 2008, Gennady and Elena Timchenko founded the Neva Foundation in Geneva, in order to promote and finance cultural projects in Switzerland and Russia. The foundation has focused on lyrical art and a partnership with the Grand Théâtre de Genève. Renowned Saint Petersburg Philharmonic conductor Yuri Temirkanov has been a trustee.

In 2010, Gennady and Elena Timchenko created the Ladoga Foundation. The main activity of the fund has been providing help for the elderly, as well as the restoration of spiritual and cultural heritage monuments, support for cultural projects and project support in the field of modern medical technology. In September 2013, the Ladoga Foundation was renamed to the Elena and Gennady Timchenko Foundation (or just Timchenko Foundation for short), consolidating all their charitable activities.

In 2011, Timchenko was elected Chairman of the Economic Council of the Franco-Russian Chamber of Commerce (CCIFR). The same year, he was also appointed Chairman of the Board of Directors and President of SKA Saint Petersburg, the leading ice hockey team. In 2012, he was appointed Chairman of the Board of Directors of the Continental Hockey League (KHL).

He serves on the board of trustees of the Jewish Museum and Tolerance Center in Moscow and is a member of the Board of Trustees of the Russian Geographical Society.

In 2020 Timchenko donated 2,9 billion rubles to help fight the COVID-19 pandemic.

== Sports and hobbies ==
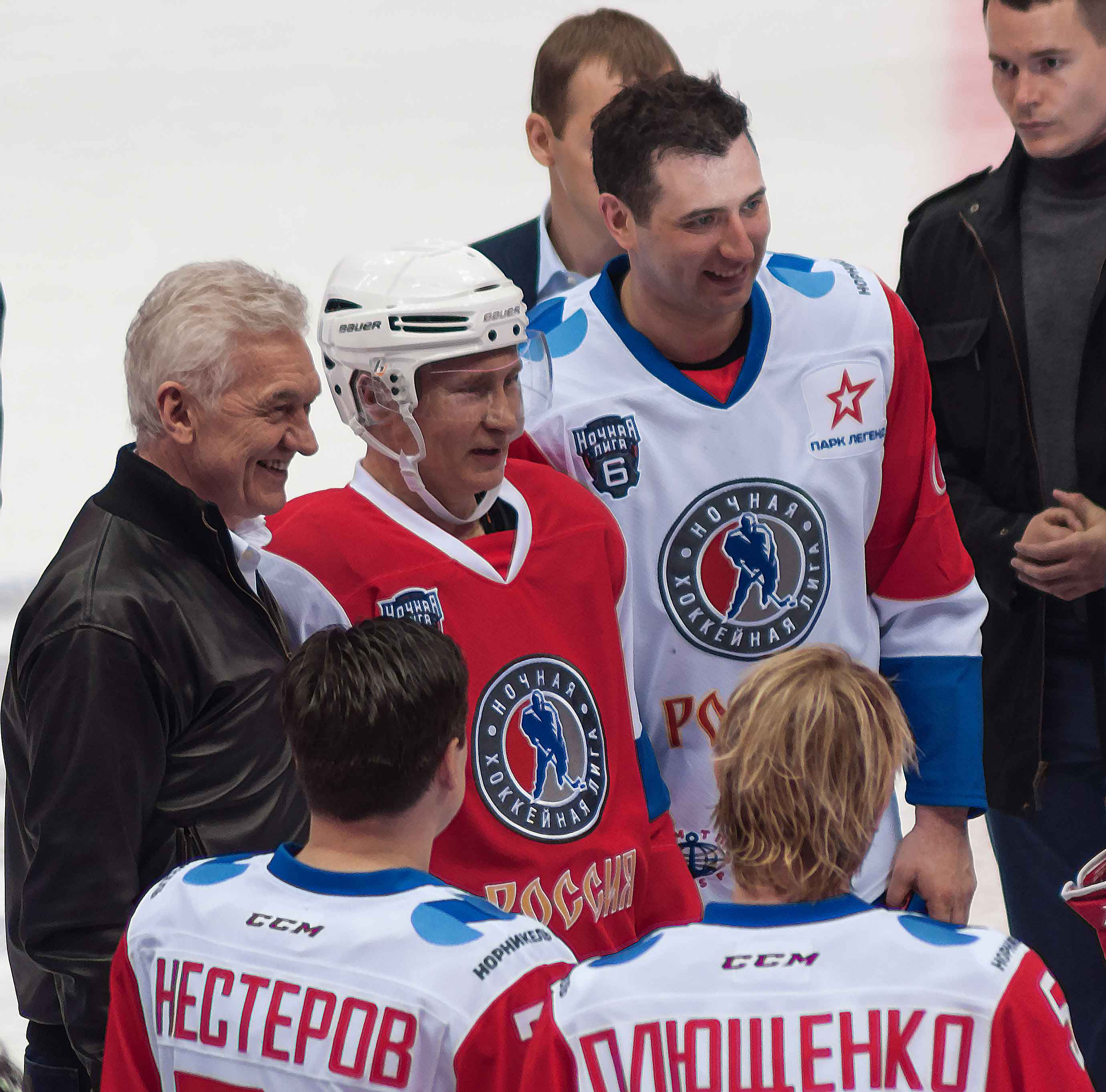
Gennady Timchenko, Vladimir Putin and Roman Rotenberg

Timchenko likes to play and watch tennis. Through his formerly owned Finnish company, IPP, he has sponsored an outdoor tennis tournament in Finland since 2000, the IPP Open. According to unconfirmed reports he funded the Finnish national team in the Davis Cup and has sponsored a number of Russian tennis players.

The media has mentioned him sponsoring a sailing team which participates in the international RC44 yachting competition.

In April 2011, Timchenko replaced Alexander Medvedev as Chairman of the Board of Directors of SKA Saint Petersburg, the Saint Petersburg-based ice hockey club. In May of the same year, under the new management structure of the club, he was appointed as Club President. In July 2012, he replaced Vyacheslav Fetisov as Chairman of the Board of Directors of the Continental Hockey League KHL. The Timchenko Foundation promotes the development of the ice hockey and chess among young people.

In 2013, he became one of the sponsors and organisers of one of the most important international chess tournaments in the ELO rating – the Alekhine Memorial.

In July 2013 Timchenko and the brothers Arkady Rotenberg and Boris Rotenberg established Arena Events Oy, which bought Helsinki's Hartwall Areena. They also bought a stake in Jokerit, the six-time national champion of the Finnish top-level ice hockey league Liiga. Consequently, Jokerit transferred to the Kontinental Hockey League for the 2014–15 season and they play in the Western Conference in Bobrov division. Arena Events Oy owned the Hartwall Areena (now Helsinki Halli) until 2024.

== Awards ==
In 2013, he was appointed as a Chevalier of the Légion d'honneur for creating a permanent exhibition of Russian art in the Louvre, support for the Russian Museum in Saint Petersburg, and help in organizing the Alekhine Memorial chess tournament. This award prompted Russian political writer Andrey Piontkovsky to write that "awarding a criminal with nickname Gangrene the highest distinction brings shame to the French state".

== See also ==
- List of Russian billionaires
- Russian oligarchs
