= Fakel (company) =

Russian private military company

- факел
- Sleeve patch of the Unit
- Active: 2023 – present
- Country: Russia
- Type: Irregular unit Private military company
- Part of: Ministry of Defence; Gazprom Neft
- Engagements: Russo-Ukrainian war: Battle of Soledar; Battle of Bakhmut; 2023 Ukrainian counteroffensive

Fakel (Russian: факел, lit. 'Torch') is a private military company owned and operated by Gazprom which is currently deployed by Russia in the second stage of the Russo-Ukrainian war.

== History ==
Fakel was founded in 2023 by the Russian state-run gas monopoly Gazprom subsidiary Gazprom Neft, as a more loyal alternative for the Wagner Group, which at the time had just begun clashing with Russian high command on issues of supplies and tactics. The group was founded alongside two other Gazprom PMCs, Plamya and Potok. Fakel and Plamya reportedly are directly subordinate to the Russian Ministry of Defence, while Potok joined Redut PMC, a PMC which is also controlled by the Russian MoD.

Fakel, and the other Gazprom run companies, have their recruiting base as Gazprom employees, promising them that while they are away on tour in Ukraine, that their positions at work would be guaranteed for their return. A large contingent of the fighters are from Gazprom's security guards. Fakel is also the name of a bi-annual Gazprom corporate talent competition, a big festival in which teams of musical performers of all ages compete for prizes, with the logo for the competition being very similar to the logo used by the PMC. Fakel is also the name of the company's semi-professional table tennis team. Although the company has no official political affiliation, several of its members support the Pravaya Rossiya far-right party led by Georg Borovikov seeking the restoration of the Russian Empire, which has stated that they are one of Fakel's patrons. Additional, several members of the company on Telegram stated they were fighting to restore the Empire.

Yevgeny Prigozhin was critical of Fakel, seeing the organization as competition for his Wagner group. Prigozhin claims that Fakel saw combat in the Battle of Bakhmut, where they were tasked with covering Wagner's flanks, and failed to do so resulting in a successful Ukrainian flanking maneuver that resulted in a large amount of Wagner casualties. Prigozhin claimed the unit had poor training and supplies, and a lack of any "tactical-level commanders." The unit has also seen combat in the Battle of Soledar.

== See also ==
- Kadyrovites
