= Volga Group =

Luxembourgish investment company

- Type: Private
- Industry: Energy; Industrials; Financial services; Consumer Goods
- Founded: 2007
- Headquarters: Luxembourg, Luxembourg
- Key people: Gennady Timchenko (shareholder), Chlodwig Reuter (Chairman)
- Number of employees: around 90,000
- Website: Volga-Resources.com

Volga Group is a privately held investment vehicle that manages assets on behalf of the businessman Gennady Timchenko.

== History ==
Volga Group was established as Volga Resources in 2007, and renamed as Volga Group in June 2013. The group consolidates Gennady Timchenko's assets and makes investments in financial services; industrials and construction; trading and logistics; consumer goods; and energy. Gennady Timchenko noted that for the next few years, his group will focus on the development of infrastructure projects in Russia.

== Major assets ==
Among Volga Group's major assets are a 23% stake in Novatek, Russia's second-largest producer of natural gas; 15.3% of petrochemicals company Sibur, 50% of the gas company Petromir, and 60% through the joint venture with Gunvor in the coal company Kolmar.

Other investments include 63% of construction company STG Group, 31.5% of CJSC Stroitransgaz, 60% of the rail company Transoil, 100% of beverage maker Aquanika, 79% of timber company Rörvik Timber, 25% of construction companies ARKS Group and SK MOST Group, 60% of aviation company Avia Group, 49.1% and 12.5% of insurance companies Sovag and Sogaz, and 9% of Rossiya Bank. It also owns 50% of Hartwall Arena in Helsinki and Helsinki Jokerit hockey team.

== Key people ==
Gennady Timchenko is the founder and main shareholder of Volga Group. Chlodwig Reuter is the chairman of the board of Volga Group. and Sven Olsson.
