= BARS (Russia) =

Russian military reserve program

BARS (Russian: Боевой Армейский Резерв Страны - БАРС, Boyevoy Armeyskiy Rezerv Strany) or simply the Combat Army Reserve is, or was, a Russian military reserve force implemented in 2015.

== History ==
=== Formation ===
The Combat Army Reserves was created by the Ministry of Defence in 2015 as an analogous organization to the British Territorial Army or the United States Army Reserve with members being paid a salary per a three-year or a one-and-a-half-year contract, and participating in at least a month per year of part-time training, with the prospect of being called to active duty in the event of war. In 2019 a study by the RAND Corporation found that there were only 4,000 to 5,000 reservists in the whole of Russia.

=== Russian protection in Ukraine ===
In 2021, during the build-up towards the Russian Invasion of Ukraine, the BARS were the subject of a massive recruitment campaign titled "BARS-21" which Russian Defense Minister Sergey Shoigu stated in several speeches hoped would bolster the force to 80,000 to 100,000 reservists. Eligible BARS reservists in the days before the invasion included soldiers younger than 42, junior officers younger than 47, colonels younger than 57, and other senior officials younger than 52. When the war did break out, 20 BARS units consisting of an estimated 10,000 reservists, were sent to Ukraine to take part in the initial invasion. BARS reservists were, on paper, paid a much higher salary than Russian conscripts and were to supposed receive a hefty pension for their service, however, upon the completion of their service, most reservists saw little to none of the promised money or bonuses. Most BARS soldiers are older veterans of the War in the Donbass, with many being members of the Union of Donbass Volunteers, and are from smaller rural settlements. BARS units and Russian PMCs often overlap, with several BARS units being directly affiliated or even run by a PMC, leaving the units in a legal grey-area.

On 24 July 2023, Vladimir Putin signed a law increasing the maximum age for all BARS members by five years. The legislation increased the official retirement age of privates, sergeants, and warrant officers from 35 to 40, officers of subaltern and field ranks from 45 to 50, and high-ranking officers from 50 to 55.

During the Ukrainian offensive into Kursk, three new BARS units where created, "BARS-Kursk", "BARS-Bryansk", and "BARS-Belgorod" which, according to governor of Kursk, Alexei Smirnov, will coordinate with the Russian military "counterterrorism" operations.

In November 2025 amendments to the law allowed BARS members to be called up also during peacetimes for "special training" to protect "critical and other life-support facilities", including against drone attacks.

== Cossack participation ==
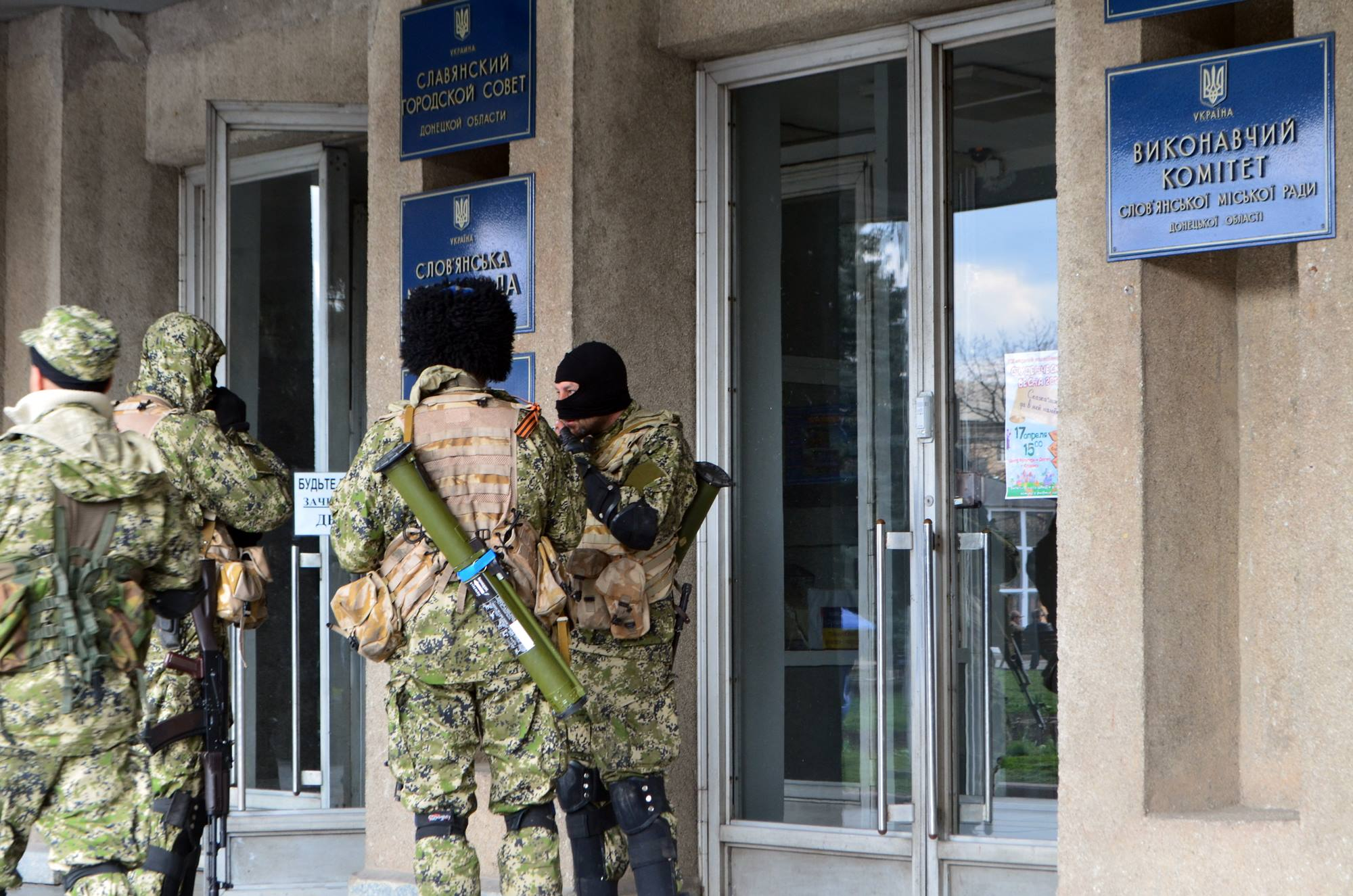
Sloviansk city council under control of Russian Registered Cossacks on 14 April 2014

Various Registered Cossacks of the Russian Federation were identified operating in Eastern Ukraine and Crimea in 2014 during the Russo-Ukrainian War. They are heavily involved in the 2022 Russian invasion of Ukraine where they are part of 18 ‘Cossack’ BARS (Combat Reserve Forces) battalions taking part in the invasion. Per Ataman Nikolai Doluda, head of the All-Russian Cossack Society, "There are three battalions each from the Kuban and Terek hosts, two from Don, one from Orenburg, a Orenburg-Volga combined battalion, one from the Ussuriskiy host, one from the Zabaykalsky host, and one from the union of “Cossack” warriors from abroad"

== Units ==
=== Battalions ===
- BARS-1: Kuban Cossacks
- BARS-2: Yakuts, Saw combat around Kharkiv in 2022. Absorbed the "Bootur-1" volunteer unit in May 2023. Bootur-1's commander, Alexander Kolesov, would become deputy commander and receive the Hero of Russia for his role in the 2023 Belgorod Oblast incursions.
- BARS-3:
- BARS-4: Veterans who returned to Russia reported a lack of pay, denial of medical treatment, and a deletion of military records.
- BARS-5:
- BARS-6: 'Forstadt', Orenburg Cossacks.
- BARS-7:
- BARS-8:
- BARS-9: 'Orel', Commander Rustam Ziganshin died in September 2021. Affiliated with the Union of Donbass Volunteers.
- BARS-10: Soldier from BARS-10 joined Wagner
- BARS-11:
- BARS-12:
- BARS-13: 'Russian Legion' Commander Sergei Fomchenkov. Affiliated with the Union of Donbass Volunteers, originally named 'Rurik'.
- BARS-14 "Sarmat":
- BARS-16 "Kuban"
- BARS-18:
- BARS-19:
- BARS-20: 'Thunder', Affiliated with the Union of Donbass Volunteers.
- BARS-21:
- BARS-22 "Tiger"
- BARS-23 "Orel":
- BARS-25 "Anwar"
- BARS-27 "Fakel"
- BARS-29: "Nevsky" Created October 2022 from an artillery detachment reformed into a BARS unit due lack of manpower.
- BARS-32 "Pavel Sudoplatov": The Russian Ministry of Defense subordinated the Pavel Sudoplatov Battalion formed on the occupied territory of Zaporizhzhia Oblast to the 32nd BARS detachment.
- BARS-33 "Vasily Margelov": First seen June 2023.
- BARS-34 "Siberia"
- BARS-35 "Skif": First seen October 2023.
- BARS-Kherson.
- BARS-Crimea:
- BARS-Kaskad "Waterfall": According to the UK MoD intelligence created by Dmitry Sablin as a unit of drone operators headquartered far behind the front line for VIPs and the family members of Kremlin elite. This allows VIPs to serve in Ukraine with a reduced risk of personal injury compared to “frontline troops”. VIPs serving in Kaskad are provided with a security detail or bodyguards. On 16 April 2024, the husband of Russian influencer Yelena Blinovskaya, Alexei Blinovsky was serving with the unit.
- BARS "Troy"
- BARS-Kursk
- BARS-Bryansk
- BARS-Belgorod

=== Higher formations ===
==== Cossacks ====
Some of the BARS are associated with the All-Russian Cossack Society. The Cossack brigades “Don”, “Dnepr” and “Terek” are united into the Volunteer Assault Corps (DShK):

- Three battalions (BARS-1, BARS-11 and BARS-16) are united into the Kuban Cossack brigade.
- Cossack brigade "Kuban" (BARS-3 and BARS-10) is part of the "Volunteer Shock Brigade" created by Dmitry Rogozin.
- BARS-6 (“Forstadt”) - Orenburg BARS-15 (“Ermak”) - Yekaterinburg BARS-18 (“Vympel”) - “Great Don Army” BARS-22 (“Tiger”) - Cossacks from Primorye BARS-35 (Skif) - form part of the Terek brigade.
