= Alexander Kuznetsov (soldier) =

- Александр Кузнецов
- Born: 8 October 1977 (age 48); Nikolskoye, Leningrad Oblast, Russian SFSR, Soviet Union
- Spouse: Elena Mikhailovna Kuznetsova
- Children: 3
- Military career
- Allegiance: Russia (2000s–2008); Wagner Group (2014–2023); Russia (2024–present)
- Branch: GRU (2000s–2008); 1st Attack and Reconnaissance Company (2014–2023); Kadyrovites (2024–present)
- Rank: Major (2008); Company commander and Council of Commanders (2014–2023)
- Nickname: Ratibor
- Conflicts: War in Donbas; Syrian Civil War; Second Libyan Civil War; Western Libya campaign (WIA); Russian invasion of Ukraine; Battle of Soledar (WIA); Wagner Group rebellion
- Awards: Hero of Russia; Order of Courage (Russia); Medal of Bravery (Russia); Hero of the Luhansk People's Republic; Hero of the Donetsk People's Republic

Aleksandr Sergeyevich Kuznetsov (Russian: Александр Сергеевич Кузнецов), also known by his nom de guerre Ratibor, is a Russian soldier who co-founded the Wagner Group alongside Yevgeny Prigozhin and Dmitry Utkin. His first role in the mercenary company was as commander of the 1st Attack and Reconnaissance Company in 2014, and fought in Syria, Libya, Sudan, and Ukraine. Following the death of Yevgeny Prigozhin in 2023, Kuznetsov joined the Chechen Akhmat forces in Ukraine with other ex-Wagner mercenaries.

== Biography ==
Kuznetsov was born on 8 October 1977, in Nikolskoye, Soviet Union, in what is now Russia. He graduated from the Saint Petersburg Higher Military Command College, and soon joined Senezh, the Russian special operations forces. In 2004, Kuznetov posted a video claiming he was in the group of Russian soldiers that killed Chechen fighter Khamzat Gelayev. He was company commander of GRU in Solnechnogorsk. In 2008, as a major in the Russian government, he was arrested and convicted of robbery and kidnapping, a sentence he served in a Nizhny Novgorod prison for five years. He helped found the Wagner Group in 2014 alongside Yevgeny Prigozhin, Anton Yelizarov, Andrei Troshev, and Dmitry Utkin with the blessing of the Russian government. He was placed as the commander of the 1st Attack and Reconnaissance Company. He took the call sign "Ratibor", and his first deployment was in Ukraine during the War in Donbas in 2014 with Rusich.

In 2016, Kuznetsov served in Syria in the Moran Security Group, a predecessor to Wagner. He was photographed with Utkin, Troshev, and Andrey Bogatov receiving the Hero of Russia award from Vladimir Putin. In 2019, Kuznetsov served with Wagner in Libya alongside the Libyan National Army during their offensives on Tripoli. On 3 October 2019, Kuznetsov was wounded in an ambush that killed 15 Wagner and Rusich operatives. He was flown to Saint Petersburg for treatment. After the injury, Kuznetsov headed Meroe Gold in Sudan, a Wagner-linked company controlling several gold mines in Sudan.

In February 2022, Kuznetsov fought in the Russian invasion of Ukraine where he was injured on 11 January 2023, during the Battle of Soledar. In December 2022, Kuznetsov had been shown in a video by Russian propagandist Vladimir Solovyov. During the Wagner Group rebellion in June 2023, Kuznetsov led Wagner's assault and capture of the city of Rostov-on-Don. He reportedly kept a low profile after the rebellion and after Prigozhin's death in September 2023, not seeking any political aims within the group. Kuznetsov joined the Akhmat Special Forces led by Apti Alaudinov alongside 3,000 other former Wagner fighters in April 2024.
