= Pikalov =

Pikalov (Russian: Пикалов) is a Russian masculine surname, its feminine counterpart is Pikalova. The surname may refer to the following notable people:

- Daria Pikalova (born 1994), Russian Paralympic swimmer
- Konstantin Pikalov (born 1968), Russian colonel and Wagner Group leader
- Marina Pikalova (born 1985), Kazakhstani handball player
- Vladimir Pikalov (1924–2003), Soviet general
