= 10th Spetsnaz Brigade =

10th Separate Special Purpose Brigade
- 10-я отдельная бригада специального назначения
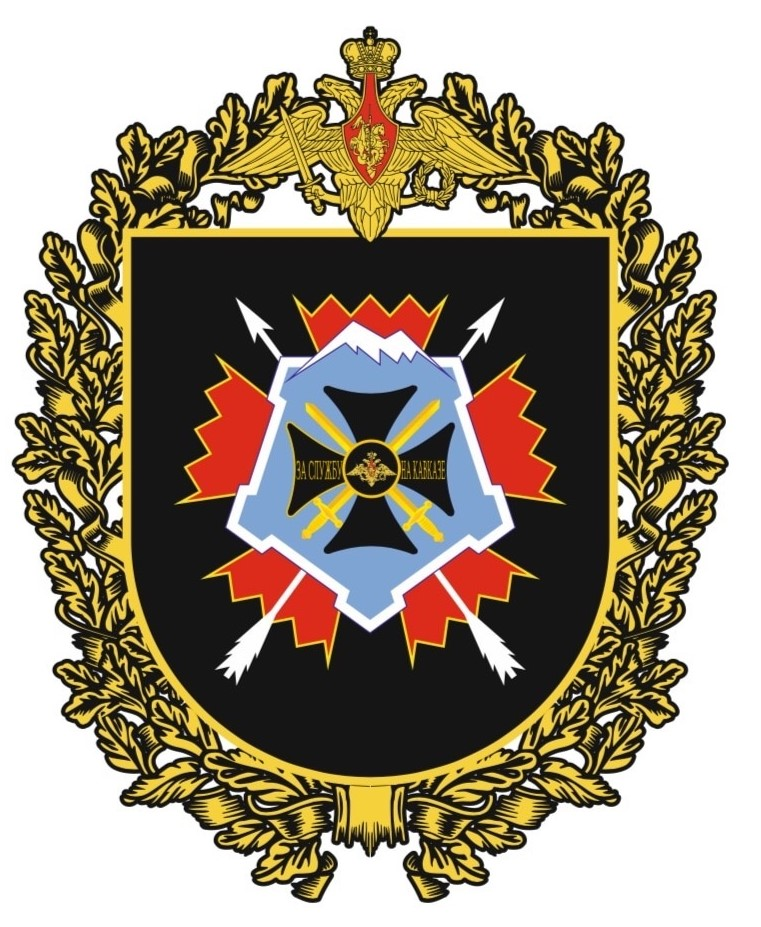
- Active: 1962–1991; 2003–present
- Country: Soviet Union (1962–1991); Russia (2003–present)
- Branch: Spetsnaz GRU
- Size: Brigade
- Garrison/HQ: Molkino, Krasnodar Krai
- Engagements: Chechan Wars; Second Chechen War

The 10th Separate Special Purpose Brigade (Russian: 10-я отдельная бригада специального назначения, romanized: 10-ya otdelnaya brigada spetsialnogo naznacheniya) is a spetsnaz military formation of the Russian Federation subordinate to the Spetsnaz GRU. It is based in Molkino, Krasnodar Krai. Its military unit number is 51532.

== History ==
The unit was formed in 1962 during the formation of the first special forces brigades of the Soviet Union. At the time it was garrisoned in Pervomaiske, Crimean Oblast, Ukrainian SSR.

It is reported that the unit was part of the Soviet invasion of Afghanistan.

After the fall of the Soviet Union in 1991 the unit was transferred to Ukraine where it was reformed into an airborne regiment.

In 2002 it was decided to establish the unit once again in Russia and this time it was garrisoned in Molkino. The new unit was created in 2003.

The unit was deployed to Chechnya 2004–2008 for the Second Chechen War.

== Structure ==
Structure of the unit as of 2023:

- 85th Special Forces Detachment
- 95th Special Forces Detachment
- 104th Special Forces Detachment
- 551st Special Forces Detachment
- Training battalion
- Medical company
- Command unit
