= Andrei Troshev =

Russian military officer (born 1962)

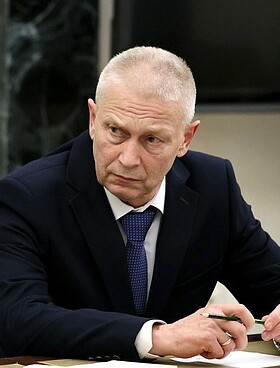
- Troshev in 2023
- Born: Andrei Nikolayevich Troshev; April 5, 1962 (age 64); Leningrad, Russian SFSR, Soviet Union
- Allegiance: Soviet Union (1980–1991); Russia (1991–2012)
- Branch: Artillery, Ministry of Internal Affairs (Russia)
- Service years: 1980–2012
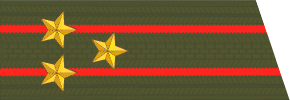
- Rank: Colonel
- Conflicts: Soviet-Afghan War; Second Chechen War; Syrian Civil War; Russo-Ukrainian War; Russian invasion of Ukraine
- Education: Kalinin Military Artillery Academy

Andrei Nikolayevich Troshev (Russian: Андрей Николаевич Трошев, IPA: [ɐnˈdrʲej nʲɪkɐˈlajɪvʲɪtɕ ˈtroʂɨf]; born April 5, 1962), nicknamed Sedoi (Russian: Седой, IPA: [sʲɪˈdoi], lit. 'the Grey-Haired'), is a Russian retired colonel, former agent for the Ministry of Internal Affairs, and a veteran of the Soviet-Afghan War, the Second Chechen War, and the Russian military intervention in the Syrian civil war. He was awarded the Hero of the Russian Federation, the highest honorary title in Russia, for his service.

On July 14, 2023, Vladimir Putin announced that he wanted Troshev to replace Yevgeny Prigozhin as the leader of the Wagner Group following Prigozhin's brief rebellion the previous month.

On September 29, 2023, he was tasked by Vladimir Putin to oversee volunteer units in Ukraine after a meeting.

== Biography ==
He was born April 5, 1962, in Leningrad (now Saint Petersburg). After graduating high school, he attended the Leningrad Higher Artillery Command School, named after Red October. After graduating, he served in various artillery units in command and officer positions. He fought in the Democratic Republic of Afghanistan as part of a limited contingent of Soviet troops. He commanded a battery of self-propelled artillery. For showing courage and heroism in the line of duty, he was awarded two Orders of the Red Star. He later graduated from the Military Artillery Academy named after M. I. Kalinin (now Mikhailovskaya Military Artillery Academy).

After the Dissolution of the Soviet Union continued to serve in the Russian Armed Forces. He participated in the Second Chechen War, for military merit he was awarded two Order of Courage awards and a Medal of the Order "For Merit to the Fatherland" of the Second Degree. He subsequently served in the Leningrad Military District units. After leaving the reserve, he continued to serve in the authorities of the Ministry of Internal Affairs. He worked in the ОМОN and SОBR units of the Main Directorate of the Ministry of Internal Affairs in the Northwestern Federal District. For some time he commanded the Saint Petersburg SOBR unit. He was dismissed from the Main Directorate under unfortunate circumstances, namely for drinking alcohol. He is also a graduate of the Russian Academy of Public Administration under the President of the Russian Federation. In 2012 he ended his service with the rank of colonel.

At the beginning of the Russian military intervention in Syria, Troshev, who at this time was already retired, went to Syria. He was not directly involved in the hostilities, instead managing the logistic service of Wagner Group and the Security Service of Wagner Group in Molkin in Krasnodar Krai. According to the online publication, he is an unstable person, has an addiction to alcohol, and is connected to the deaths of several dozen (according to some publications, hundreds) of Wagner soldiers in February 2018 by United States armed forces. This was categorically denied in a variety of sources. Despite the large number of deaths in the SAR operations, by a closed Decree of Putin, Troshev was awarded the title of Hero of the Russian Federation. According to some media sources, Troshev was taken to a hospital while intoxicated and mentally unstable, while having maps of Syria, money and other important documents with him. According to unverified information, after returning to Russia, he worked for Wagner Group, as the Chief of Staff, and also lead the Security Service of Wagner in Molkin in Krasnodar Krai. Some publications considered him the leader of the entire company, but this is not confirmed information.

Currently, he is engaged in social causes. He is the chairman of the St. Petersburg organization "League for Protecting the Interests of Veterans of Local Wars and Military Conflicts." He also coordinates some operations related to Wagner, under the leadership of Evgeny Gulyaev. He also participates in commemorative events, including those dedicated to the anniversaries of the end of the Afghan War.

After Wagner's mutiny and Yevgeny Prigozhin's death, Vladimir Putin said that the group could continue operating and signing contracts with the Russian Defense Ministry under Troshev.

== International sanctions ==
On June 29, 2022, Troshev was included in the UK sanctions list as one of the leaders of Wagner Group, which participated in the Syrian Civil War on the side of Bashar al-Assad and government forces.

On December 13, 2021, he was included in the sanctions lists of all EU countries:

The chief of staff of the Wagner group, which operates in Syria, trains and directs Syrian forces. The Wagner Group also supports the Assad regime and fights alongside regime-linked militias and the Syrian army. Andrey Troshev is directly involved in the military operations of the Wagner Group in Syria. In particular, he was involved in the Deir ez-Zor area. Thus, he makes a decisive contribution to Bashar al-Assad's military actions and supports and benefits from the Syrian regime.

— Official Journal of the European Union, Brussels, December 13, 2021
