= Andrey Bogatov =

- Андрей Михайлович Богатов
- Born: June 14, 1964 (age 62); Stary Oskol, Belgorod Oblast, USSR (now Russia)
- Military career
- Allegiance: Russia (1990s-present) Wagner Group (2014-present)
- Nickname: "Brodiaga" "Бродяга"
- Units: 4th Assault and Reconnaissance Group
- Conflicts: Russian intervention in the Syrian civil war: Battle of Palmyra (WIA)
- Awards: Hero of the Russian Federation

Andrey Mikhailovich Bogatov (Ru: Андрей Михайлович Богатов) is a Russian soldier who fought in the Russian intervention in the Syrian civil war for the Wagner Group.

== Biography ==
Bogatov was born on June 14, 1964, in Stary Oskol, Belgorod Oblast, Russia. Prior to his military career, he worked as a metalworker at the Oskol Electrometallurgical Plant. Unlike many Wagner Group fighters, he doesn't have a criminal record outside of parking citations.

Bogatov began his military service in the airborne troops and was deployed to Afghanistan during the Soviet–Afghan War and fought in the Yugoslav Wars. In the Wagner Group, he served as the commander of the 4th Reconnaissance and Assault Company. Bogatov played a heavy role in Wagner Group operations in Syria. In spring of 2016, he was wounded near Palmyra and lost his left arm during the battle, but continued to lead the unit. He received the Hero of the Russian Federation award at the same time as Andrei Troshev. Afterwards, he was transferred to the head of the security for Hayyan Gas Company in Homs Governorate.

In June 2021, he was included in the top three leaders of Rodina to participate in the 2021 Russian legislative election.

In 2023, he was appointed director of a center for military and patriotic education for children in the Belgorod region near Ukrainian border.

== War in Ukraine and sanctions ==
Since June 29, 2022, Bogatov has been under British sanctions due to his participation in Russian atrocities in Syria and the suppression of the civilian population. On December 13, 2021, Bogatov was under European Union sanctions for the same reasons. Since February 28, 2023, he has been under Ukrainian sanctions for his complicity in Russian war crimes in Ukraine.

Following the failed Wagner Group rebellion in June 2023 and the assassination of Yevgeny Prigozhin, Bogatov and other Wagner leaders kept a low profile and submitted to the Russian government. While Bogatov himself did not fight in Ukraine, he trained new Wagner recruits in 2023 and 2024 and Prigozhin had put him in charge of Wagner recruitment. He has also been instrumental in building defense lines in Russian-occupied areas of Donetsk Oblast, Luhansk Oblast, and Belgorod Oblast. Bogatov's personal driver Sergei Pavlenko took part in the failed 2021 Ukrainian coup attempt.
