= Wagner Group =

Russian private military company

- Группа Вагнера, ЧВК «Вагнер»
- Flag of Wagner Group since April 2023 Logo of Wagner Group
- Other name: Wagnerites, Wagners, Musicians, Orchestra
- Leader: Pavel Prigozhin
- Military leader: Anton Yelizarov
- Founders: Yevgeny Prigozhin †; Dmitry Utkin †
- Ruling body: Council of Commanders
- Notable leaders: Yevgeny Prigozhin †; Dmitry Utkin †; Cpt. Anton Yelizarov; Col. Konstantin Pikalov; Col. Andrei Troshev; Valery Chekalov †; Col. Gen. Mikhail Mizintsev
- Dates active: 2014–present
- Headquarters: PMC Wagner Center, Saint Petersburg, Russia
- Size: 5,000 (2024); 85,000 (2023); 50,000+ (December 2022); 8,000 (April 2022); 6,000 (December 2017); 1,000 (March 2016); 250 (2014)
- Part of: National Guard of Russia (since 2023)
- Wars: List: Crimean Crisis; War in Donbas (2014–2022); 2014 Il-76 shootdown; Battle of Debaltseve; Syrian civil war; 2015–16 Latakia offensive; Northern Aleppo offensive; Palmyra offensive (March 2016); Palmyra offensive (2017); Central Syria campaign; Hama offensive; Deir ez-Zor offensive; Northwestern Syria campaign; Battle of Khasham; Rif Dimashq offensive; Operation Dawn of Idlib; 2024 Syrian opposition offensives; Syrian Desert campaign (2017 – 2024) South Sudanese Civil War (military training and security); CAR Civil War; Bongboto massacre; Aïgbado massacre; March 2022 attacks; Second Libyan Civil War; Western Libya campaign Sudanese Revolution Venezuelan presidential crisis (military training and security) Insurgency in Cabo Delgado; Mali War; Moura Massacre; Battle of Tinzaouaten; Russian invasion of Ukraine; Battle of Donbas (2022); Battle of Popasna; Battle of Sievierodonetsk (2022)-Battle of Lysychansk; Battle of Bakhmut-Battle of Soledar; 2023 Ukrainian counteroffensive; Kursk campaign; Sudanese civil war (2023–present); Wagner Group rebellion; Lord's Resistance Army insurgency; 2024 Haute-Kotto raid

The Wagner Group (Russian: Частная военная компания «Вагнер», romanized: Chastnaya Voennaya Kompaniya "Vagner"), officially known as PMC Wagner (ЧВК «Вагнер», ChVK "Vagner"), is a Russian state-funded private military company (PMC) that was controlled until 2023 by Yevgeny Prigozhin, a former close ally of Russia's president Vladimir Putin, and since then by Pavel Prigozhin. The Wagner Group has used infrastructure of the Russian Armed Forces. Evidence suggests that Wagner has been used as a proxy by the Russian government, allowing it to have plausible deniability for military operations abroad, and hiding the true casualties of Russia's foreign interventions.

The group emerged during the war in Donbas, where it helped Russian separatist forces in Ukraine from 2014 to 2015. Wagner played a significant role in the later full-scale Russian invasion of Ukraine, for which it recruited Russian prison inmates for frontline combat. By the end of 2022, its strength in Ukraine had grown from 1,000 to between 20,000 and 50,000. It was reportedly Russia's main assault force in the Battle of Bakhmut. Wagner has also supported regimes friendly with Russia, including in the civil wars in Syria, Libya, the Central African Republic, and Mali. In Africa, it has offered regimes security in exchange for the transfer of diamond- and gold-mining contracts to Russian companies. Some Wagner members, including its alleged co-founder Dmitry Utkin, have been linked to the far-right, and the unit has been accused of war crimes including murder, torture, rape and robbery of civilians, as well as torturing and killing accused deserters.

Prigozhin admitted that he was the leader of Wagner in September 2022. He began openly criticizing the Russian Defense Ministry for mishandling the war against Ukraine, eventually saying that the Russian government's stated reasons for the invasion were lies. On 23 June 2023, he led the Wagner Group in an armed rebellion against Russia after accusing the Defense Ministry of shelling Wagner soldiers. Wagner units seized the Russian city of Rostov-on-Don, while a Wagner convoy headed towards Moscow. The mutiny was halted the next day when an agreement was reached: Wagner mutineers would not be prosecuted if they chose to either sign contracts with the Defense Ministry or withdraw to Belarus.

Prigozhin, along with Wagner commanders Dmitry Utkin and Valery Chekalov, died on 23 August 2023 in a plane crash in Russia, leaving Wagner's leadership structure unclear. Western intelligence reported that it was likely caused by an explosion on board, and it is widely suspected that the Russian state was involved. In October 2023, pro-Wagner groups reported that Pavel Prigozhin, son of former leader Yevgeny Prigozhin, had taken over command of the Wagner Group.

== Origins and leadership ==
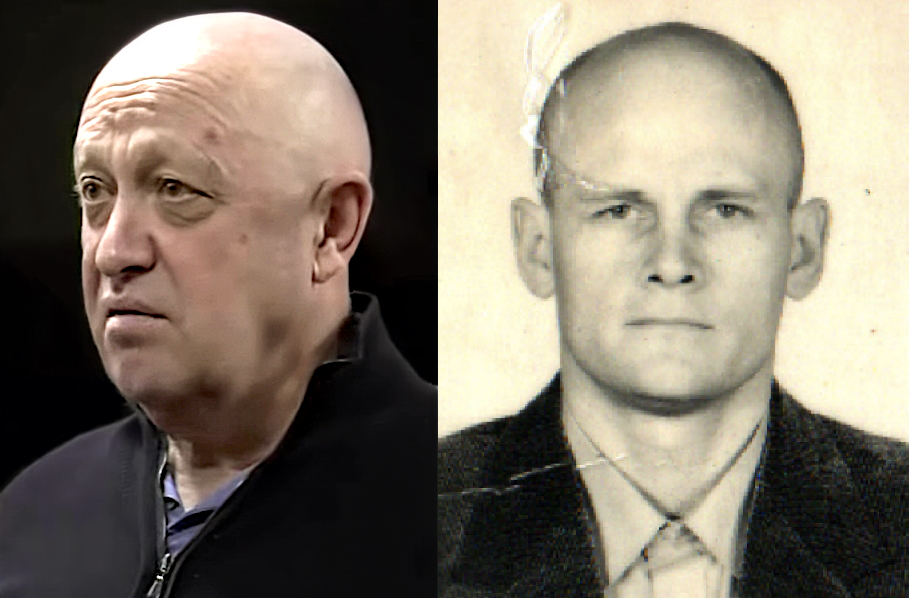
Yevgeny Prigozhin (left) and Dmitry Utkin (right)

The Wagner Group first appeared in 2014, during the Russian annexation of Crimea. Until 2022 it was unclear who founded and led the group. Both Dmitry Utkin and Yevgeny Prigozhin have been named as its founders and leaders. During the Russian invasion of Ukraine, Prigozhin claimed to have founded Wagner and he was referred to as the group's head. Some sources say Prigozhin was its owner and financier while Utkin was its military commander.

=== Yevgeny Prigozhin ===
It was long reported that Prigozhin had links with Wagner and Utkin personally. He was sometimes called "Putin's chef", because of his catering businesses that hosted dinners for Vladimir Putin. The businessman was said to be the main funder and actual owner of the Wagner Group. Prigozhin denied any link with Wagner and had sued Bellingcat, Meduza, and Echo of Moscow for reporting his links to the mercenary group. In September 2022, he claimed to have founded the group, saying "I cleaned the old weapons myself, sorted out the bulletproof vests myself and found specialists who could help me with this. From that moment, on May 1, 2014, a group of patriots was born, which later came to be called the Wagner Battalion". Prigozhin became Wagner's public face and was referred to as its chief, but as he had no military background, he reportedly relied on Utkin to command Wagner's military operations.

=== Dmitry Utkin ===
Utkin was a Russian military veteran. Before his involvement with the Wagner Group, he was a lieutenant colonel and brigade commander of a Spetsnaz GRU unit, and fought in the First and Second Chechen wars. Many sources name Utkin as a founder and the first commander of Wagner. Reportedly, Utkin was an admirer of Nazi Germany and the group was named from his alias "Wagner". The European Union sanctions against the Wagner Group name Utkin as its founder and leader. It is reported that Utkin was Wagner's military commander, responsible for overseeing its military operations, while Prigozhin was its owner, financier and public face. According to Bellingcat, evidence suggests Utkin "was more of a field commander" and "was not in the driver's seat of setting up this private army, but was employed as a convenient and deniable decoy to disguise its state provenance".

In December 2016, Utkin was photographed with Russian president Putin at a Kremlin reception in honour of those who had been awarded the Order of Courage and the title Hero of the Russian Federation, along with Alexander Kuznetsov, Andrey Bogatov and Andrei Troshev. Kuznetsov (alias "Ratibor") was said to be the commander of Wagner's first reconnaissance and assault company, Bogatov was the commander of the fourth reconnaissance and assault company, and Troshev served as the company's "executive director". A few days after, Kremlin spokesman Dmitry Peskov confirmed the presence of Utkin at the reception.

=== Konstantin Pikalov ===
Colonel Konstantin Aleksandrovich Pikalov (alias "Mazay") was said to have been put in charge of Wagner's African operations in 2019. Pikalov served as an officer in Russia's experimental military unit numbered 99795, based in the village of Storozhevo, near Saint Petersburg. The unit was tasked, in part, with "determining the effects of radioactive rays on living organisms". Following his retirement, he continued to live on the military base until at least 2012 and ran a private detective agency. In 2014 he allegedly took part in suppressing opponents of the Russian-backed president of Republika Srpska, Milorad Dodik, during the Republika Srpska general election. Between 2014 and 2017, Pikalov traveled several times to destinations near the Ukrainian border, sometimes on joint bookings with known Wagner officers. Former employees of Prigozhin said Pikalov took part in military operations in Ukraine and Syria.

== Organization ==
Flag of Wagner Group from 2014 to April 2023. (Note: Both the flag and emblem still see unofficial use.)

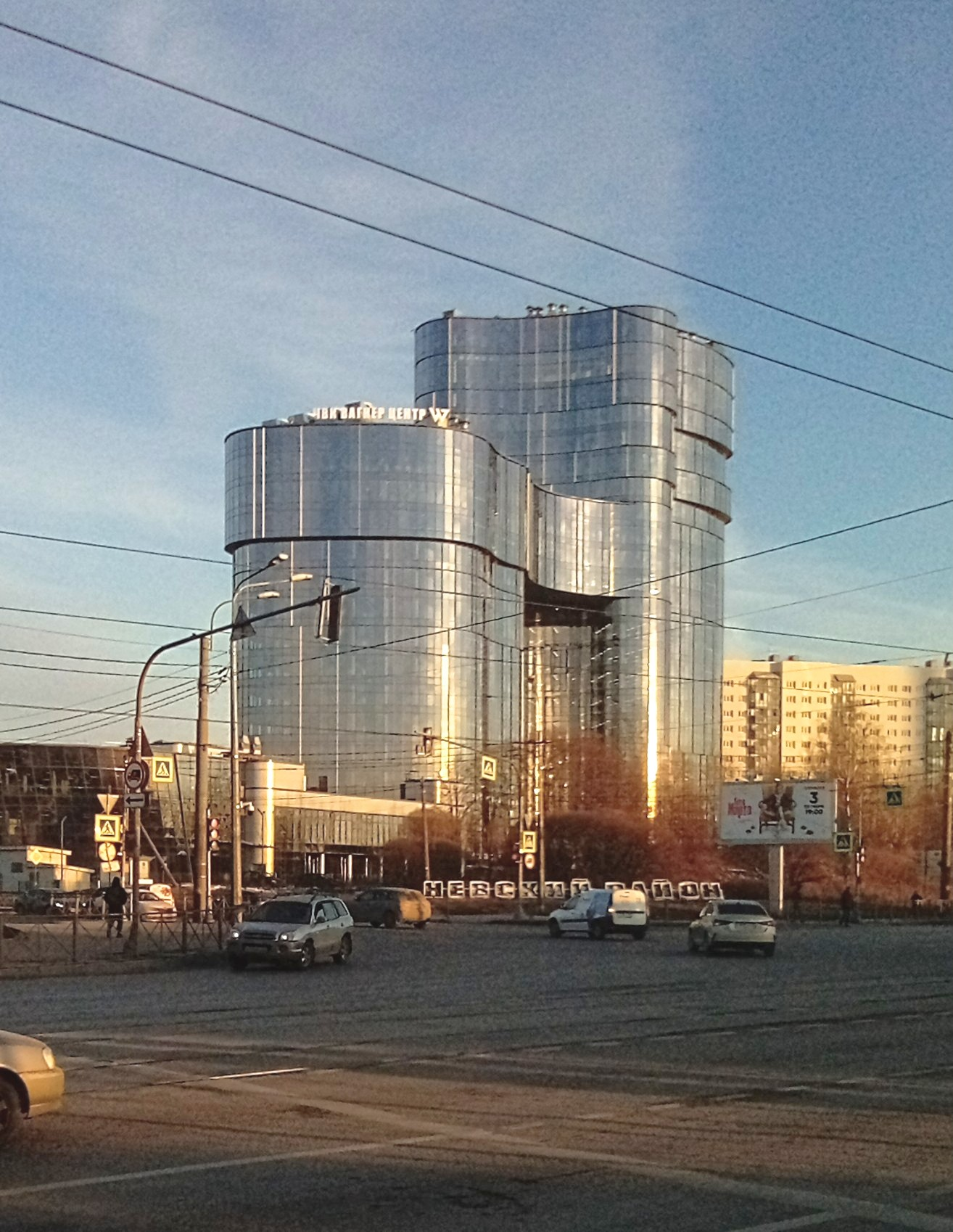
The PMC Wagner Center office in Saint Petersburg

In early 2016, Wagner had 1,000 employees, which later rose to 5,000 by August 2017, and 6,000 by December 2017. The organization was said to be registered in Argentina and has offices in Saint Petersburg and Hong Kong. In November 2022, Wagner opened a new headquarters and technology center at the PMC Wagner Center building in the east of Saint Petersburg.

In early October 2017, the SBU said that Wagner's funding in 2017 had been increased by 185 million rubles ($3.1 million) and that around forty Ukrainian nationals were working for Wagner, with the remaining 95 percent of the personnel being Russian citizens. One Ukrainian was killed in Syria while fighting in the ranks of Wagner in March 2016, and three were reported overall to have died that spring. Armenians, Kazakhs and Moldovans have also worked for Wagner.

Following the deployment of its contractors between 2017 and 2019, to Sudan, the Central African Republic, Madagascar, Libya and Mozambique, the Wagner Group had offices in 20 African countries, including Eswatini, Lesotho and Botswana, by the end of 2019. Early in 2020, Erik Prince, founder of the Blackwater private military company, sought to provide military services to the Wagner Group in its operations in Libya and Mozambique, according to The Intercept. By March 2021, Wagner PMCs were reportedly also deployed in Zimbabwe, Angola, Guinea, Guinea Bissau, and possibly the Democratic Republic of Congo.

According to the Financial Times, the Wagner Group does not exist as a single incorporated entity, but instead as a "sprawling network of interacting companies with varying degrees of proximity to [Prigozhin's] Concord group" – such as Concord Management and Consulting and Concord Catering. This abstruse structure has allegedly complicated efforts by Western governments to restrict Wagner's activities.

Wagner's network of shell companies, reported to be primarily trading in illegally mined and extracted natural resources, has also been shown to have used Western banking systems to process funds without their knowledge. The Washington-based think-tank the Center for Advanced Defense Studies (C4ADS), uncovered leaked documents showing how in 2017 the Sudanese Mining company, Meroe Gold, acting as a shell company for the Wagner Group, was able to use financial services provided by JP Morgan Chase to process a payment to a seller in China. C4ADS's report on the leaked documents showed that without the use of legitimate financial institutions such as JP Morgan Chase and HSBC as intermediaries to move funds, the Wagner Group would not have been able to establish a foothold in Africa.

Based partly on leaked documents provided by the Dossier Center, investigative journalist David Patrikarakos has stated that Wagner has never been under the control of either the GRU or the Ministry of Defense, as has often been claimed, but is instead exclusively run by Prigozhin.

=== Recruitment, training, techniques ===
The company trains its personnel at a Russian MoD facility, Molkino (Молькино), near the remote village of Molkin, Krasnodar Krai. The barracks at the base are officially not linked to the Russian MoD, with court documents describing them as a children's vacation camp. According to a report published by Russian monthly Sovershenno Sekretno, the organisation that hired personnel for Wagner did not have a permanent name and had a legal address near the military settlement Pavshino in Krasnogorsk, near Moscow. In December 2021, New Lines magazine analyzed data about 4,184 Wagner members who had been identified by researchers at the Ukrainian Center of Analytics and Security, finding that the average age of a Wagner private military contractor (PMC) is forty years old and that the PMCs came from as many as fifteen different countries, though the majority were from Russia.

When new PMC recruits arrive at the training camp, they are no longer allowed to use social network services and other Internet resources. Company employees are not allowed to post photos, texts, audio and video recordings or any other information on the Internet that was obtained during their training. They are not allowed to tell anyone their location, whether they are in Russia or another country. Mobile phones, tablets and other means of communication are left with the company and issued at a certain time with the permission of their commander.

Passports and other documents are surrendered and in return company employees receive a nameless dog tag with a personal number. The company only accepts new recruits if a 10-year confidentiality agreement is established and in case of a breach of the confidentiality the company reserves the right to terminate the employee's contract without paying a fee. According to the Security Service of Ukraine (SBU), Russian military officers are assigned the role of drill instructors for the recruits. During their training, the PMCs receive $1,100 per month.

The pay of Wagner PMCs, who are usually retired regular Russian servicemen aged between 35 and 55, is estimated to be between 80,000 and 250,000 Russian rubles a month (667–2,083 USD). One source stated the pay was as high as 300,000 (US$2,500).

In late 2019, a so-called Wagner code of honor was revealed that lists ten commandments for Wagner's PMCs to follow. These include, among others, to protect the interests of Russia always and everywhere, to value the honor of a Russian soldier, to fight not for money, but from the principle of winning always and everywhere. With increasing casualties on both sides in the war in Ukraine, the Russian government used the Wagner Group for recruitment. The NGO Meduza reported that the Russian Defense Ministry had taken control of Wagner's networks and was using its reputation for recruitment, but that the requirements had been reduced, with drug tests also reportedly not being done before duty. According to British intelligence, since July 2022 at the latest, the Wagner Group has been trying to recruit inmates from Russian prisons in order to alleviate the lack of cadets. In return for agreeing to fight in Ukraine, the criminals are promised a shortening of the sentence and monetary remuneration. BBC Russian Service reported that according to jurists, it is not legal to send inmates to war. Captured and retired members report that the Wagner policy of "zeroing out" (summary execution) of fighters who retreat or desert means that in situations where regular Army units would retreat, Wagner continues its assault. "If they move forward, they at least have the chance to live another day. If they go back, they're dead for sure." A Ukrainian battalion commander reported that in intercepted radio traffic on the battlefield, Ukrainians hear "over and over" Wagner commanders giving the order: "Anyone who takes a step back, zero them out."

The Wagner Group reportedly recruited imprisoned UPC rebels in the Central African Republic to fight in Mali and Ukraine. They are reportedly nicknamed the "Black Russians".

In April 2023, The New York Times reported that it had interviewed several HIV-positive former Wagner fighters who said that they had been deprived of effective treatment as convicts unless they agreed to fight in the group.

=== Recruitment of non-Russians ===
Wagner has tried to recruit non-Russians to serve in their units. Among those who were recruited are nationals from the Central African Republic, Iraq, Libya, Mali, Palestine and Syria.

=== Units ===
==== Rusich unit ====
The Wagner Group includes a contingent known as Rusich, or Task Force Rusich, referred to as a "sabotage and assault reconnaissance group", which has been fighting as part of the Russian separatist forces in eastern Ukraine. Rusich are described as a far-right extremist or neo-Nazi unit, and their logo features a Slavic swastika. The group was founded by Alexey Milchakov and Yan Petrovsky, both of them neo-Nazis, in the summer of 2014, after graduating from a paramilitary training program run by the Russian Imperial Legion, the fighting arm of the Russian Imperial Movement. As of 2017, the Ukrainian Prosecutor General and the International Criminal Court (ICC) were investigating fighters of this unit for alleged war crimes committed in Ukraine.

==== Serb unit ====
Wagner is believed to have a Serb unit, which was, until at least April 2016, under the command of Davor Savičić, a Bosnian Serb who was a member of the Serb Volunteer Guard (also known as Arkan's Tigers) during the Bosnian War and the Special Operations Unit (JSO) during the Kosovo War. His call sign in Bosnia was "Elvis". Savičić was reportedly only three days in the Luhansk region when a BTR armored personnel carrier fired at his checkpoint, leaving him shell-shocked. After this, he left to be treated. He was also reported to have been involved in the first offensive to capture Palmyra from the Islamic State (ISIL) in early 2016.

One member of the Serbian unit was killed in Syria in June 2017, while the SBU issued arrest warrants in December 2017, for six Serbian PMCs that belonged to Wagner and fought in Ukraine, including Savičić. In early February 2018, the SBU reported that one Serb member of Wagner, who was a veteran of the conflict in Syria, had been killed while fighting in eastern Ukraine. In January 2023, Serbian president Aleksandar Vučić criticized Wagner for recruiting Serbian nationals and called on Russia to put an end to the practice, noting that it is illegal under Serbian law for Serbian citizens to take part in foreign armed conflicts.

== Relationship with the Russian state ==
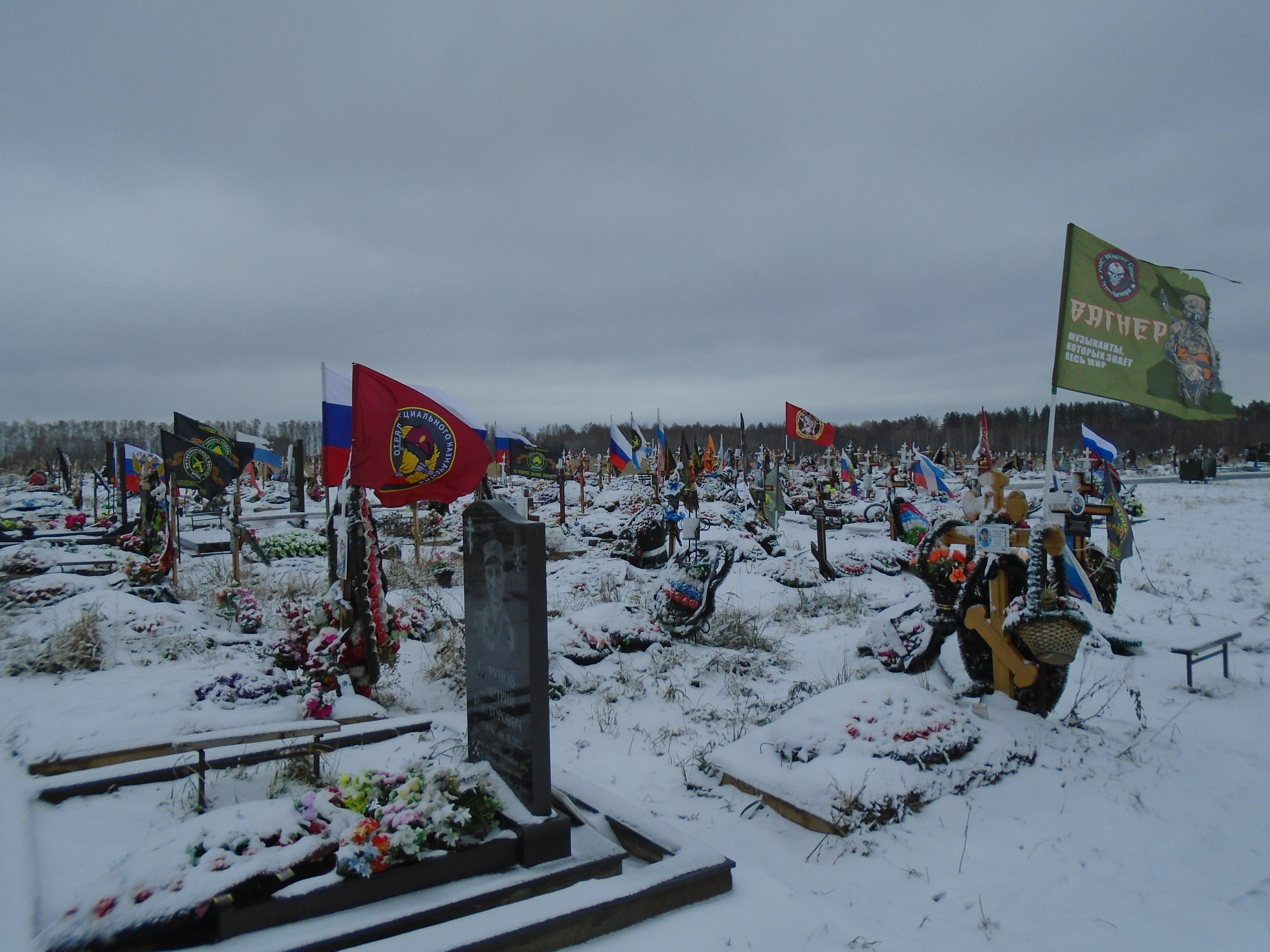
Wagner Group graves among other military graves in the Kurgan cemetery, Sovetsky City District, Kazan

On 27 June 2023, President Putin, while declaring an investigation into Wagner Group spending, confirmed that the Russian state fully funded it from the country's defense budget and state budget. From May 2022 to May 2023 alone, the Russian state paid 86.262 billion RUB to the group, approximately $1 billion. Putin previously repeatedly denied any links between the Russian state and Wagner, stating that Wagner is a "private military company".

Before that, many Russian and Western observers believed that the organization does not actually exist as a private military company but is in reality a disguised branch of the Russian MoD that ultimately reports to the Russian government. The company shares bases with the Russian military, is transported by Russian military aircraft, and uses Russia's military health care services. The Russian state is also documented supporting the Wagner Group with passports.

The legal status of private military companies in Russia is vague: on one hand, Russian legislation explicitly prohibits "illegal armed formations and mercenary groups", but at the same time the Russian state does not prosecute numerous PMCs employing Russians and operating in Russia, including but not limited to Wagner. Viktor Ozerov once hinted that this ban does not apply for companies "registered abroad" and in such case "Russia is not legally responsible for anything". This vagueness was interpreted as a tool that enables the Russian state to selectively allow operations of PMCs it needs, while preventing creation of any PMCs that would create a risk for Putin and at the same time manage plausible deniability for their actions.

As result, a number of PMCs appear to have been operating in Russia, and in April 2012 Vladimir Putin, speaking in the State Duma as Russian prime minister, endorsed the idea of setting up PMCs in Russia. Several military analysts described Wagner as a "pseudo-private" military company that offers the Russian military establishment certain advantages such as ensuring plausible deniability, public secrecy about Russia's military operations abroad, as well as about the number of losses. Thus, Wagner contractors have been described as "ghost soldiers", due to the Russian government not officially acknowledging them.

In March 2017, Radio Liberty characterized the PMC Wagner as a "semi-legal militant formation that exists under the wing and on the funds of the Ministry of Defence". In September 2017, the chief of Ukraine's Security Service (SBU) Vasyl Hrytsak said that, in their opinion, Wagner was in essence "a private army of Putin" and that the SBU were "working on identifying these people, members of Wagner PMC, to make this information public so that our partners in Europe knew them personally". The Wagner Group has also been compared with Academi, the American security firm formerly known as Blackwater.

According to the SBU, Wagner employees were issued international passports in bulk by the GRU via Central Migration Office Unit 770–001 in the second half of 2018, allegations partially verified by Bellingcat.

In an interview in December 2018, Russian president Putin said, regarding Wagner PMC's operating in Ukraine, Syria and elsewhere, that "everyone should remain within the legal framework" and that if the Wagner group was violating the law, the Russian Prosecutor General's Office "should provide a legal assessment". But, according to Putin, if they did not violate Russian law, they had the right to work and promote their business interests abroad. Putin also denied allegations that Prigozhin had been directing Wagner's activities.

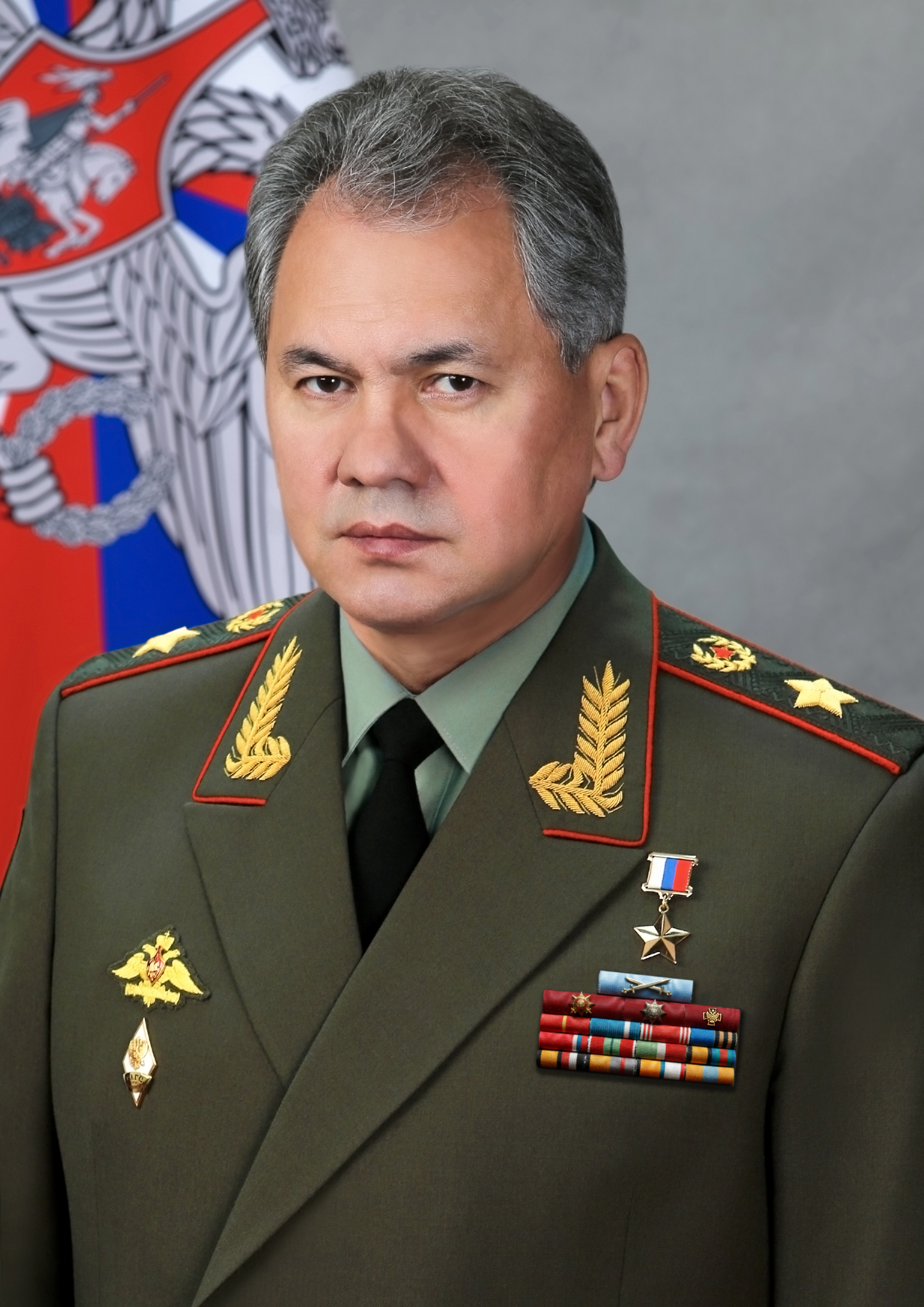
Prigozhin was in a public feud with Russian defense minister Sergei Shoigu.

In September 2022, Prigozhin officially admitted to founding and managing "Wagner Group" which started as a battalion participating from May 2014 on the Russian side in the war in Donbas.

According to a Russia investigative media Russkiy Kriminal, the military command of "Wagner" is held directly by the GRU, including its current head Igor Kostyukov and former head of Russian SSO Aleksey Dyumin, with Prigozhin being responsible for its business administration. "Wagner" is mostly populated by current and former Spetsnaz GRU operatives, and used for operations where direct GRU participation is undesirable. Russian journalists also link Prigozhin to Yuri Kovalchuk and Sergey Kiryenko, both influential figures close to Putin. "Wagner's" interests in the official structures of Russian Ministry of Defense are reportedly represented by general Sergey Surovikin.

Private military companies are still illegal in Russia, but with their heavy participation in the war in Ukraine they have been legitimized by being referred by the Ministry of Defense and Russian government with the umbrella term of "volunteer detachments".

On 5 May 2023, Prigozhin blamed Russian defense minister Sergei Shoigu and Chief of Staff of the Russian Armed Forces Gen. Valery Gerasimov for "tens of thousands" of Wagner casualties, saying "They came here as volunteers and are dying so you can sit like fat cats in your luxury offices." In 2023, the Russian government granted the status of combat veterans to Wagner contractors who took part in Russia's invasion of Ukraine.

In a video released on 23 June 2023, Prigozhin said that Russian government justifications for the Russian invasion of Ukraine were based on lies. He accused the Russian Defense Ministry under Shoigu of "trying to deceive society and the president and tell us how there was crazy aggression from Ukraine and that they were planning to attack us with the whole of NATO."

=== Wagner Group rebellion ===
Map of the Wagner Group rebellion

On 24 June 2023, Prigozhin was accused by the Russian government of organizing an armed uprising after he threatened to attack Russian forces in response to a claimed air strike on his paramilitary soldiers. Russian security forces accused the founder of the Wagner group of launching a coup attempt as he pledged a "march of justice" against the Russian army. Prigozhin posted a voice memo claiming that Wagner had left Ukraine and was advancing on the Russian city of Rostov-on-Don. Senior Russian generals urged Wagner's fighters to withdraw. Meanwhile, Russia's national security service, FSB, said it had filed criminal charges against Prigozhin and moved to arrest him. Prigozhin claimed that Wagner mercenary forces entered Rostov without any resistance. A deal was eventually brokered by Belarusian president Alexander Lukashenko de-escalated the rebellion. According to the agreement, Prigozhin was to leave Russia for Belarus, and the criminal case against him was to be dropped. No legal action was to be taken against his troops, and the Wagner fighters were to sign contracts with the Russian Defense Ministry.

Russian president Putin had stated on 8 February 2022, that the Russian state is not involved and has nothing to do with Wagner's activities in Africa. On 27 June 2023, he said that Wagner is fully funded by Russia, amounting to $1 billion from the defense ministry and state budget for May 2022 to May 2023 alone. In July, Russian state media said Prigozhin's Wagner Group had received the equivalent of $9.8B and his Concord catering business $9.6B from state sources. Two weeks later, Putin once again stated that "legally Wagner Group does not exist".

On 26 August 2023, following Prigozhin's death in a plane crash in Tver Oblast, Putin signed a decree ordering Wagner Group fighters to swear an "oath of allegiance" to the Russian state. This new oath applies to all PMCs, including those fighting in Ukraine.

== Activities ==
A map of Wagner Group activities: Russia Known to operate Suspected or reported but unconfirmed presence

The Wagner Group is known to have operated in at least 11 countries; Russia, Belarus, Ukraine, Syria, Sudan, Mozambique, Central African Republic, Mali, Libya, Venezuela, and Madagascar, spanning four continents, Europe, Africa, South America and Asia. There are unconfirmed reports of activities in other countries.

=== Ukraine ===
Wagner has been heavily involved in the Russian invasion of Ukraine, where it has been reportedly deployed to assassinate Ukrainian leaders, among other activities, and for which it has recruited prison inmates from Russia for frontline combat. In December 2022, United States National Security Council Coordinator for Strategic Communications John Kirby claimed Wagner had 50,000 fighters in Ukraine, including 10,000 contractors and 40,000 convicts. Others put the number of recruited prisoners at more than 20,000, with the overall number of PMC forces present in Ukraine estimated at 20,000. In 2023, Russia granted combat veteran status to Wagner contractors who took part in the invasion.

==== Crimea annexation and War in Donbas ====
Wagner PMCs were first active in February 2014 in Crimea during Russia's 2014 annexation of the peninsula where they operated in line with regular Russian army units, disarmed the Ukrainian Army and took control over facilities. The takeover of Crimea was almost bloodless. The PMCs, along with the regular soldiers, were called "polite people" at the time due to their well-mannered behavior. They kept to themselves, carried weapons that were not loaded, and mostly made no effort to interfere with civilian life. Another name for them was "little green men" since they were masked, wearing unmarked green army uniforms and their origin was initially unknown.

After the takeover of Crimea, some 300 PMCs went to the Donbas region of eastern Ukraine where a conflict started between Ukrainian government and pro-Russian forces. With their help, the pro-Russian forces were able to destabilize government security forces in the region, immobilize operations of local government institutions, seize ammunition stores and take control of towns. The PMCs conducted sneak attacks, reconnaissance, intelligence-gathering and accompanied VIPs. The Wagner Group PMCs reportedly took part in the June 2014 Il-76 airplane shoot-down at Luhansk International Airport and the early 2015 Battle of Debaltseve, which involved one of the heaviest artillery bombardments in recent history, as well as reportedly hundreds of regular Russian soldiers.

Following the end of major combat operations, the PMCs were reportedly given the assignment to kill dissident pro-Russian commanders that were acting in a rebellious manner, according to the Russian nationalist Sputnik and Pogrom internet media outlet and the SBU, (other sources describe those who started to "turn up dead" and whose fate Wagner was suspected of being responsible for as "the most charismatic and ideologically driven leaders". According to the SBU and the Russian media, Wagner also forced the reorganization and disarmament of Russian Cossack and other formations. The PMCs acted mostly in the LPR. The LPR accused Ukraine of committing the assassinations, while unit members of the commanders believed it was the LPR authorities who were behind the killings. Wagner left Ukraine and returned to Russia in autumn of 2015, with the start of the Russian military intervention in the Syrian Civil War.

In late November 2017, a power struggle erupted in the separatist Luhansk People's Republic in Eastern Ukraine between LPR president Igor Plotnitsky and the LPR's interior minister, Igor Kornet, who Plotnitsky ordered to be dismissed. During the turmoil, armed men in unmarked uniforms took up positions in the center of Luhansk. Some of the men belonged to Wagner, according to the Janes company. In the end, Plotnitsky resigned and LPR security minister Leonid Pasechnik was named acting leader "until the next elections." Plotnitsky reportedly fled to Russia and the LPR's People's Council unanimously approved Plotnitsky's resignation. As of October 2018, a few dozen PMCs remained in the Luhansk region, according to the SBU, to kill any people considered "undesirable by Russia".

==== Full-scale invasion of Ukraine since 2022 ====
The Times reported that the Wagner Group flew in more than 400 contractors from the Central African Republic in mid- to late-January 2022 on a mission to assassinate Ukrainian president Volodymyr Zelenskyy and members of his government, and thus to prepare the ground for Russia to take control for the Russian invasion of Ukraine, which started on 24 February 2022. A US official stated that there were "some indications" that Wagner was being employed, but it was not clear where or how much. By 3 March, according to The Times, Zelenskyy had survived three assassination attempts, two of which were allegedly orchestrated by the Wagner Group.

In late March, it was expected that the number of Wagner PMCs in Ukraine would be tripled from around 300 at the beginning of the invasion to at least 1,000, and that they were to be focused on the Donbas region of eastern Ukraine. In late April, a Russian military offensive to take the remainder of the Donbas region dubbed the Battle of Donbas was launched and Wagner PMCs took part in the Battle of Popasna, the capture of Svitlodarsk, the Battle of Sievierodonetsk, and the Battle of Lysychansk. During fighting near Popasna on 20 May, retired Major General Kanamat Botashev of the Russian Air Force was shot down while flying a Sukhoi Su-25 attack aircraft, reportedly for the Wagner Group.

Regions of Ukraine annexed by Russia in 2014 and 2022, with a red line marking the area of actual control by Russia on 30 September 2022

During the invasion, Wagner PMCs also trained Russian servicemen before they were sent to the frontline.

From the beginning of July, inmates recruited by Wagner, including Prighozin personally, in Russian prisons started participating in the invasion of Ukraine. The inmates were offered 100,000 or 200,000 rubles and amnesty for six months of "voluntary service", or 5 million for their relatives if they died. On 5 January 2023, the first group of 24 prisoners recruited by Wagner to fight in Ukraine finished their six-month contracts and were released with full amnesty for their past crimes.

During the Battle of Bakhmut in late September, senior Wagner commander Aleksey Nagin was killed. Nagin previously fought with Wagner in Syria and Libya, and before that took part in the Second Chechen War and the Russo-Georgian War. He was posthumously awarded the title of Hero of the Russian Federation. On 22 December, United States National Security Council Coordinator for Strategic Communications John Kirby claimed that around 1,000 Wagner fighters were killed in fighting at Bakhmut during the previous weeks, including some 900 recruited convicts. Ukrainian soldiers and former convicts prisoners of war described the use of recruited convicts at Bakhmut as "bait", as poorly armed and briefly trained convicts were sent in human wave attacks to draw out and expose Ukrainian positions to attack by more experienced units or artillery.

In 2023, journalist Joshua Yaffa reported that recruited prisoners make up approximately 80% of Wagner's manpower. They are identified with the letter "K" and deployed in waves, in intervals of 15–20 minutes, whereas professional mercenaries are given the letter "A" and "held back, entering the battle only once Ukrainian defenses had been softened." An interviewed former Wagner mercenary who deserted reported a high mortality rate for the prisoners recruited to fight for Wagner in Ukraine: "Once we started using prisoners, it was like a conveyor belt. A group comes – that's it, they're dead." He stopped remembering their names or call signs. "A new person shows up, survives for five minutes, and he's killed. It was like that day after day."

In mid-January 2023, the Wagner Group captured the salt mine town of Soledar after heavy fighting. During the battle, Wagner reportedly surrounded Ukrainian troops in the center of the town. Hundreds of Russian and Ukrainian troops were killed in the Battle of Soledar. Several days later, Wagner captured Klishchiivka, south of Bakhmut, after which they continued advancing west of the settlement.

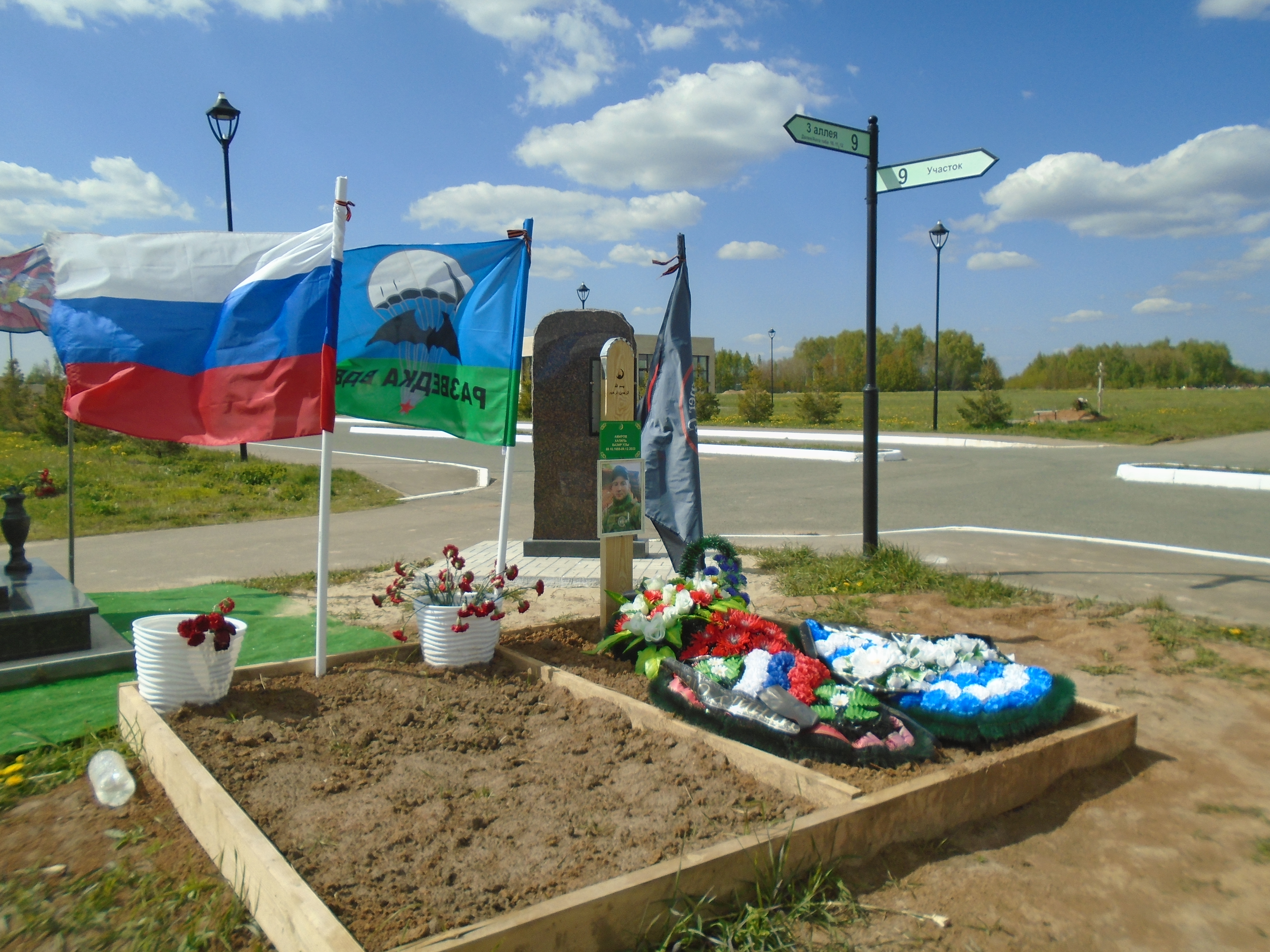
Grave of Wagner Group fighter Khalil Amirov at the Kurgan Cemetery in Kazan, Republic of Tatarstan, Russia, May 2024

A US estimate mid-February 2023, put the number of Wagner PMC casualties in the invasion at about 30,000, of which about 9,000 killed. The US estimated that half of those deaths had occurred in fighting for Bakhmut since the middle of December, with 90 percent of Wagner fighters who had been killed since December being convicts. On 1 May 2023, the US updated its estimate of Wagner casualties, with 10,000 fighters killed and 40,000 wounded since 1 December 2022 alone, again in fighting for Bakhmut. Concurrently, the UK Ministry of Defence estimated that convicts recruited by Wagner had experienced a casualty rate of up to 50 percent.

On 19 July 2023, Prigozhin announced the Wagner Group would no longer fight in Ukraine.

On 27 September 2023, the Ukrainian military reported that around 500 Wagner Group fighters returned to fight in Donetsk Oblast as part of the 2023 Ukrainian counteroffensive and as part of the group's redeployment in Ukraine for the first time since its failed rebellion against the Russian military establishment in June. They are being led by Andrei Troshev, a retired colonel appointed by Russian president Vladimir Putin.

=== Syria ===
Military situation in Syria in August 2015

The presence of the PMCs in Syria was first reported in late October 2015, almost a month after the start of the Russian military intervention in the country's civil war, when between three and nine PMCs were killed in a mortar attack in Latakia province.

Wagner PMCs were involved in both Palmyra offensives in 2016 and 2017, as well as the Syrian Army's campaign in central Syria in the summer of 2017 and the Battle of Deir ez-Zor in late 2017. They were in the role of frontline advisors, fire and movement coordinators, forward air controllers who provided guidance to close air support, and "shock troops" alongside the Syrian Army.

In early February 2018, the PMCs took part in a battle at the town of Khasham, in eastern Syria, which resulted in heavy casualties among Syrian government forces and the Wagner Group as they were engaged by United States air and artillery strikes, due to which the incident was billed by media as "the first deadly clash between citizens of Russia and the United States since the Cold War". Sources said Wagner group losses were anywhere between 10 and 200.

Subsequently, the Wagner Group took part in the Syrian military's Rif Dimashq offensive against the rebel-held Eastern Ghouta, east of Damascus. The whole Eastern Ghouta region was captured by government forces on 14 April 2018, effectively ending the near 7-year rebellion near Damascus.

The PMCs also took part in the Syrian Army's offensive in northwestern Syria that took place in mid-2019. As of late December 2021, Wagner PMCs were still taking part in military operations against ISIL cells in the Syrian desert.

On 15 March 2023, the Syrian Observatory for Human Rights said that 266 Russian PMCs were killed in Syria during the civil war.

=== Africa ===
The Wagner Group has been active in Africa since 2017. It has provided military support, security and protection to several African governments. In return, Russian and Wagner-linked companies have been given privileged access to those countries' natural resources, such as rights to gold and diamond mines, while the Russian military has been given access to strategic locations such as airbases and ports. This has been described as a kind of state capture, whereby Russia gains influence over those states and they become dependent on it.

Wagner Group PMCs arrived in Madagascar to provide security for then-president Hery Rajaonarimampianina in the 2018 Malagasy presidential election. In early August 2019, the Wagner Group received a contract with the government of Mozambique to provide technical and tactical assistance to the Mozambique Defense Armed Forces (FADM). At least 200 PMCs and military equipment arrived in Mozambique to fight an Islamist insurgency in Cabo Delgado Province which started on 5 October 2017.

In a September 2023, New York Times opinion piece, American national security expert, Sean McFate, presented Yevgeny Prigozhin's operation of the Wagner Group in Africa as a template for mercenary money-making or "a blueprint for wannabe mercenary overlords to follow". The model is to find "conflict markets", a state with instability ("political rivalries, post-colonial grievances and short on rule of law") and natural resources. Once Prigozhin's had

spotted an opening, he would pitch it to Mr. Putin, and, if amenable, Mr. Putin would unofficially sanction Wagner's operations, sometimes providing them with military equipment and intelligence. ... With Mr. Putin's blessing in place, Mr. Prigozhin would approach the potential client, typically a head of state or group of putschists, and propose a deal. He would coup-proof them using Wagner muscle and create an elite military unit to serve them. He would use another arm of his business empire, a troll factory called the Internet Research Agency, to smear domestic opposition, popularize the client and further exploit grievances against the West. In exchange, he very likely demanded two things. First, the regime had to abandon the West and support Russia's interests. Second, it had to grant Russia access to natural resources such as oil, natural gas and gold.

In November 2023, it was announced that an "Africa Corps" was being formed as "part of a special structure of the Ministry of Defence"; a US government source said that the Africa Corps was a rival to Wagner that aimed to absorb its personnel and activities in Africa. By the following year, the Wagner Group in Africa was merged into the 'Africa Corps'. According to the French Le Monde newspaper, its name referenced the Nazi German Afrika Korps of World War II.

==== Sudan ====
The earliest reports of PMC Wagner involvement in Sudan came in 2017. The PMCs were sent to Sudan to support it militarily against South Sudan and protect gold, uranium and diamond mines.

Following Omar al-Bashir's overthrow in a coup d'état on 11 April 2019, Russia continued to support the Transitional Military Council (TMC) that was established to govern Sudan, as the TMC agreed to uphold Russia's contracts in Sudan's defense, mining and energy sectors. This included the PMCs' training of Sudanese military officers. The Wagner Group's operations became more elusive following al-Bashir's overthrow. They continued to mostly work with Sudan's Rapid Support Forces (RSF). Wagner was said to be linked to the Deputy Chairman of the TMC and commander of the RSF, Gen. Mohamed Hamdan Dagalo.

In April 2020, the Wagner-connected company "Meroe Gold" was reported to be planning to ship personal protective equipment, medicine, and other equipment to Sudan amid the coronavirus pandemic. Three months later, the United States sanctioned the "M Invest" company, as well as its Sudan subsidiary "Meroe Gold" and two individuals key to Wagner operations in Sudan, for the suppression and discrediting of protesters.

Following the 2021 Sudanese coup d'état, Russian support for the military administration set up in Sudan became more open and Russian-Sudanese ties, along with Wagner's activities, continued to expand even after Russia's invasion of Ukraine in 2022, leading to condemnation by the United States, United Kingdom and Norway. The Wagner Group obtained lucrative mining concessions. 16 kilometres (10 mi) from the town of Abidiya, in Sudan's northeastern gold-rich area, a Russian-operated gold mine was set up that was thought to be an outpost of the Wagner Group. Further to the east, Wagner supported Russia's attempts to build a naval base on the Red Sea. It used western Sudan's Darfur region as a staging point for its operations in other neighbouring countries, the Central African Republic, Libya and parts of Chad. Geologists of the Wagner-linked "Meroe Gold" company also visited Darfur to assess its uranium potential.

In November 2023, the Kyiv Post released drone footage of what it claimed was Ukrainian special forces attacking Wagner PMC soldiers in Sudan with a rocket launcher.

==== Central African Republic ====
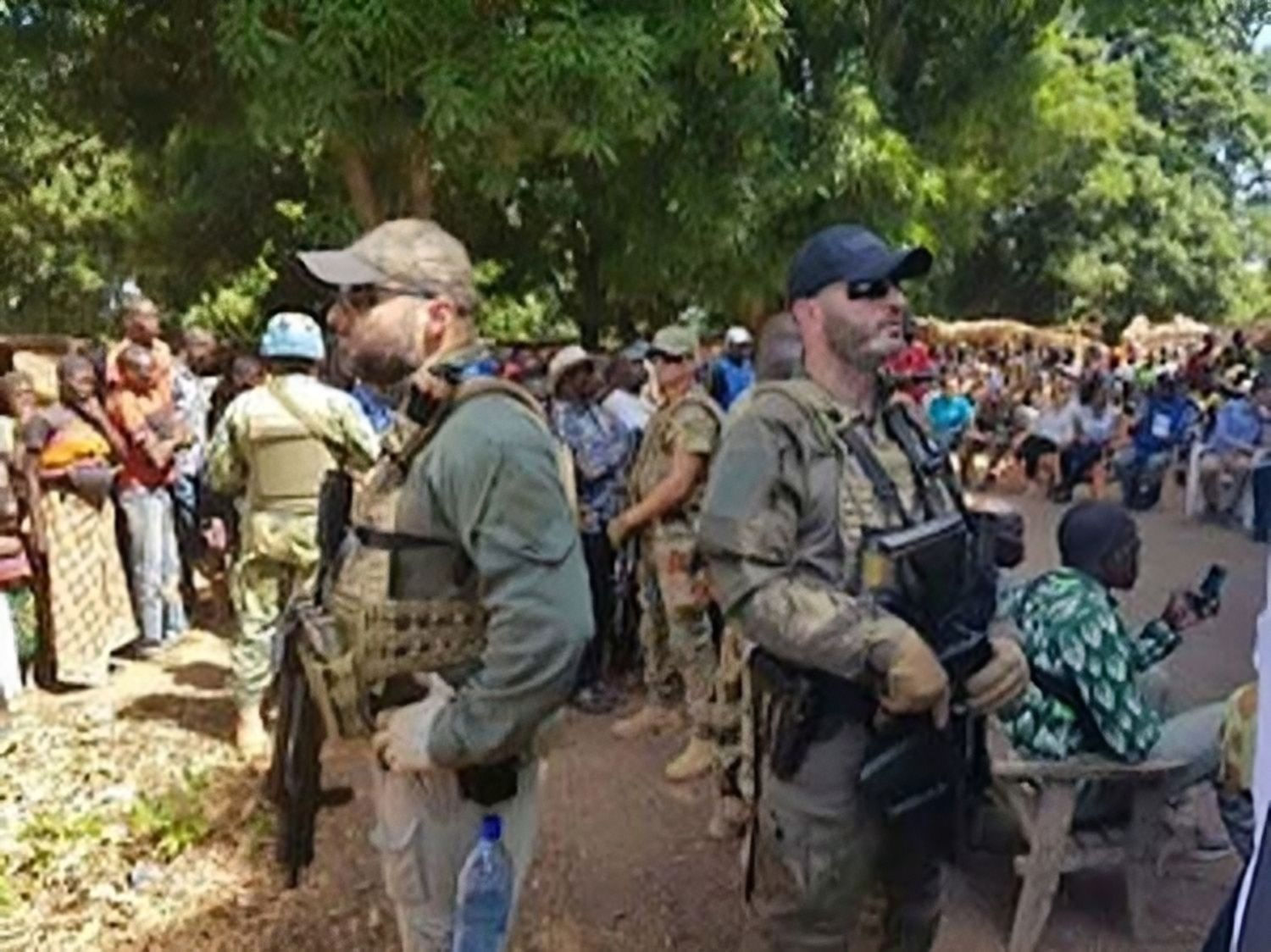
Wagner Group mercenaries in Koundjili, Central African Republic, May 2019

In 2018, the Wagner Group deployed its personnel to the CAR, to protect lucrative mines, support the CAR government, and provide close protection for the president, Faustin-Archange Touadéra.

By May 2018, it was reported that the number of Wagner PMCs in the CAR was 1,400, while another Russian PMC called Patriot was in charge of protecting VIPs.

By 2021, the situation in the CAR had deteriorated further, with rebels attacking and capturing Bambari. In response, Russia sent an additional 300 military instructors to the country to train government forces and provide support. The presence of Wagner and other Russian PMCs in the CAR has raised concerns about Russia's growing influence in Africa and its willingness to flout international law.

In September 2022, The Daily Beast interviewed survivors and witnesses of a massacre committed by the Wagner Group in the village of Bèzèrè in December 2021, which involved torture, killing and disembowelment of a number of women, including pregnant ones.

According to The New York Times, a report "prepared for members of the U.N. Security Council" found Wagner forces complicit in numerous cases in the Central African Republic of "excessive force, indiscriminate killings, occupation of schools and looting on a large scale, including of humanitarian organizations."

Military situation in the Central African Republic in July 2023

In mid-January 2023, the Wagner Group sustained relatively heavy casualties as a new government military offensive was launched near the CAR border with Cameroon and Chad. Fighting also erupted near the border with Sudan. The rebels claimed between seven and 17 Wagner PMCs were among the dozens of casualties. A CAR military source also confirmed seven Wagner contractors were killed in one ambush.

According to a 2022 joint investigation and report from European Investigative Collaborations (EIC), the French organization All Eyes on Wagner, and the UK-based Dossier Center, Wagner Group has been controlling Diamville diamond trading company in Central African Republic since 2019. According to The New Yorker, the group also holds sway over "much of the timber industry and operates a network of gold and diamond mines", and according to "a senior US intelligence official", the CAR is now a "proxy state" of the Wagner Group. At the same time, a "French military official" complained to journalist Joshua Yaffa, "They don't really bring stability, or even fight rebel groups all that successfully. What they do is protect the government in power and their own economic interests." Bohumil Doboš of the Institute of Political Studies in Prague described Wagner's operation in the CAR as a neo-imperialist and neo-colonial kind of state capture, whereby Russia gains sway by helping to keep the ruling government in power and making them reliant on its protection, while generating economic and political benefits for Russia, without benefitting the local population.

==== Libya ====
Military situation in Libya in November 2018

The group's presence in Libya was first reported in October 2018, when Russian military bases had been set up in Benghazi and Tobruk in support of Field Marshal Khalifa Haftar, who leads the Libyan National Army (LNA). The group was said to be providing training and support to Haftar's forces, and Russian missiles and SAM systems were also thought to be set up in Libya. By early March 2019, around 300 Wagner PMCs were in Benghazi supporting Haftar, according to a British government source. The LNA made large advances in the country's south, capturing a number of towns in quick succession, including the city of Sabha and the El Sharara oil field, Libya's largest oil field. Following the southern campaign, the LNA launched an offensive against the Government of National Accord (GNA)-held capital of Tripoli, but the offensive stalled within two weeks on the outskirts of the city due to stiff resistance.

By mid-November, the number of Wagner PMCs in Libya had risen to 1,400, according to several Western officials. The US Congress was preparing bipartisan sanctions against the PMCs in Libya, and a US military drone was shot down over Tripoli, with the US claiming it was shot down by Russian air defenses operated by Russian PMCs or the LNA. An estimated 25 Wagner military personnel were killed in a drone strike in September 2020, although the Russian government denied any involvement. The GNA ultimately recaptured Tripoli in June 2020, leading to a ceasefire agreement in October 2020.

==== Mali ====
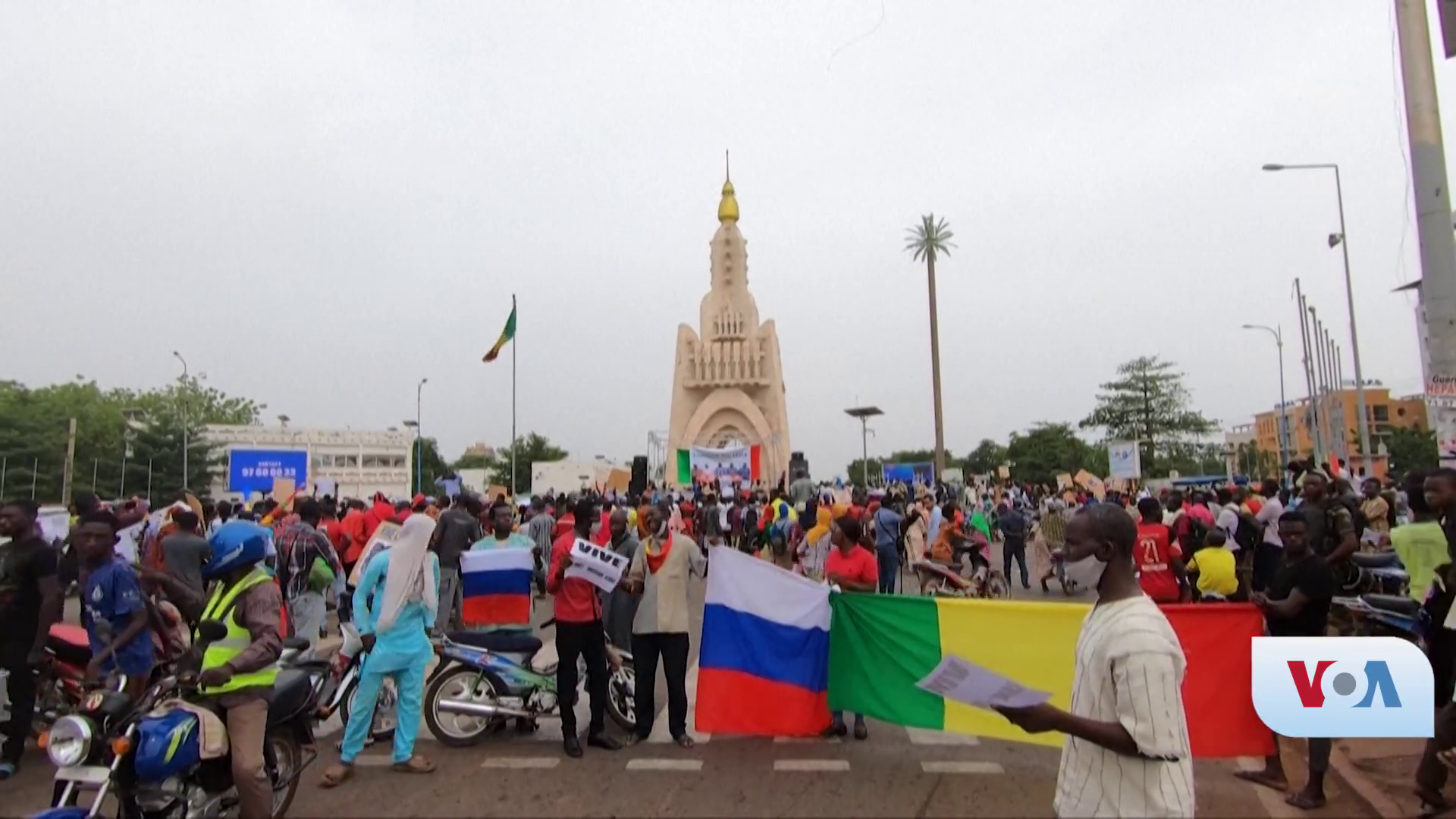
A demonstration in support of the Malian Armed Forces in Bamako after the 2021 Malian coup d'état

In September 2021, reports surfaced that an agreement was close to being finalized that would allow the Wagner Group to operate in Mali. France, which previously ruled Mali as a colony, was making a diplomatic push to prevent the agreement being enacted. Since late May 2021, Mali has been ruled by a military junta that came into power following a coup d'état. The United Kingdom, European Union and Ivory Coast also warned Mali not to engage in an agreement with the Wagner Group. Still, on 30 September, Mali received a shipment of four Mil Mi-17 helicopters, as well as arms and ammunition, as part of a contract agreed in December 2020.

The following months, Russian military advisors arrived in the country and were active in several parts of Mali.

On 5 April 2022, Human Rights Watch published a report accusing Malian soldiers and Russian PMCs of executing around 300 civilians between 27 and 31 March, during a military operation in Moura, in the Mopti region, known as a hotspot of Islamic militants. According to the Malian military, more than 200 militants were killed in the operation, which reportedly involved more than 100 Russians.

On 28 July 2024, it was reported that "dozens" of Wagner mercenaries had been killed or injured by Tuareg rebels in fighting at the commune of Tinzaouaten near the Algerian border in the north of Mali as they were moving in a convoy with Malian government soldiers. The Wagner Group confirmed that it suffered casualties during the battle, but did not give a death toll. On 21 November, at least seven Wagner soldiers were killed by al-Qaeda affiliate JNIM in an ambush on a convoy in the Mopti region.

===== Torture and killings of civilians =====
In November 2025, the BBC published an article recounting the experiences of several eyewitnesses that had come in contact with Wagner mercenaries in Mali who described being tortured, witnessing killings, and random beatings. Some Wagner members shared their atrocities on an invitation only Telegram channel, where the European Council of Foreign Relations said members were regularly posting photos and videos depicting torture, murder, rape, desecration of corpses, and cannibalism of alleged insurgents and civilians until it was shut down in the middle of 2025. The Africa Report said it had ″infiltrated″ the channel in June 2025, finding 322 videos and 647 photos depicting atrocities including severed heads and gouged out eyes as well as posts "laced with racism".

One shopkeeper described being accused by Wagner of colluding with jihadists and being forcibly taken to a hangar where he was repeatedly tortured and encountered other captives, including a Tuareg man who said he had been detained without being told why, and an Arab man who said he had been taken while looking for his camels. The shopkeeper said that both the Tuareg man and the Arab man were beheaded in his presence, after which Wagner mercenaries brought one of the bodies closer to him to smell the blood and threaten him. The shopkeeper was released after a Wagner commander called a Malian army officer who explained that the man was not working with jihadists.

=== Venezuela ===
In late January 2019, Wagner PMCs were reported by Reuters to have arrived in Venezuela during the unfolding presidential crisis. They were sent to provide security for President Nicolás Maduro, who was facing opposition protests as part of the socioeconomic and political crisis that had been gripping Venezuela since 2010. The leader of a local chapter of a paramilitary group of Cossacks with ties to the PMCs reported that about 400 contractors may have been in Venezuela at that point. It was said that the PMCs flew in two chartered aircraft to Havana, Cuba, from where they transferred onto regular commercial flights to Venezuela.

An anonymous Russian source close to the Wagner Group stated that another group of PMCs had already arrived in advance of the May 2018 presidential election. Before the 2019 flare-up of protests, the PMCs were in Venezuela to mostly provide security for Russian business interests like the Russian energy company Rosneft. They assisted in the training of the Venezuelan National Militia and the pro-Maduro Colectivos paramilitaries in 2018. Russian ambassador to Venezuela, Vladimir Zayemsky denied the report of the existence of Wagner in Venezuela.

=== Belarus ===
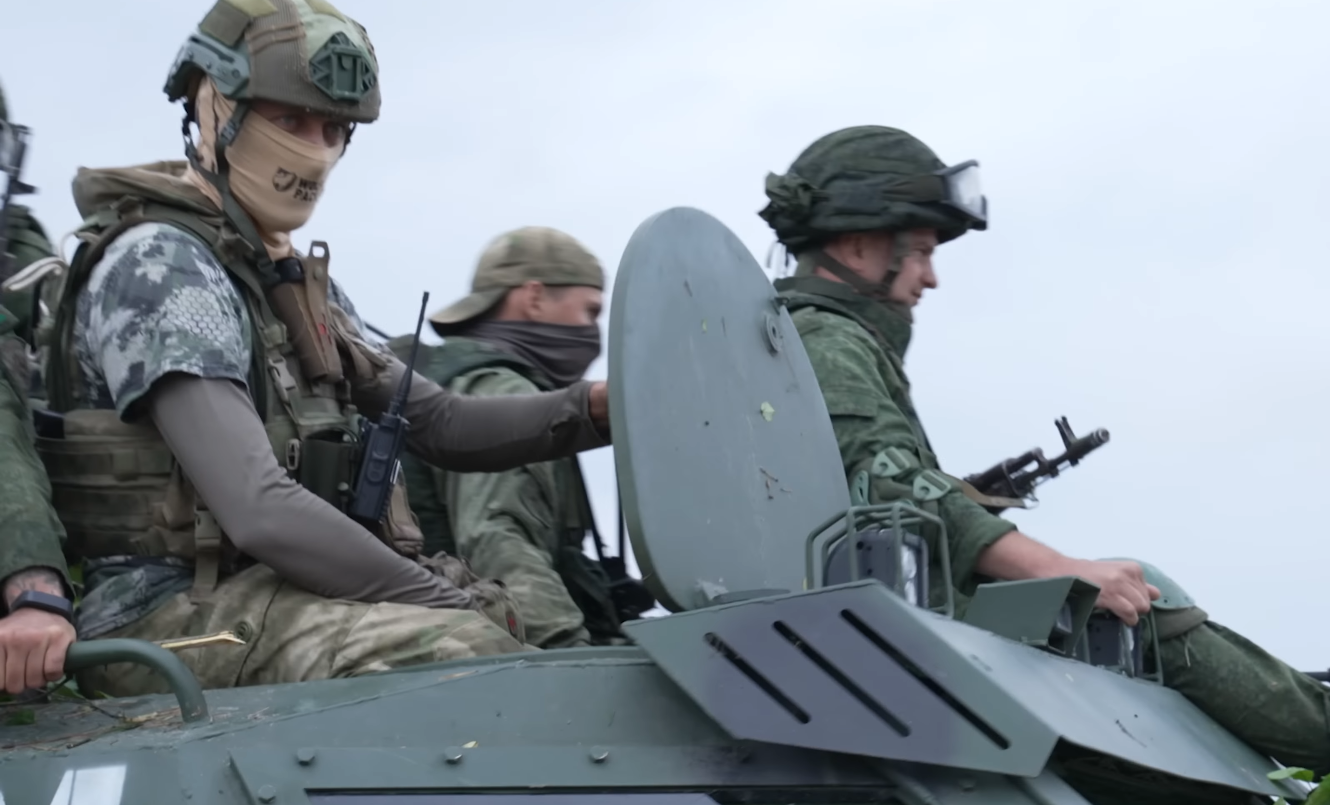
Wagner Group members in Belarus, July 2023

In July 2020, ahead of the country's presidential election, Belarusian law enforcement agencies arrested 33 Wagner contractors. The arrests took place after the security agencies received information about over 200 PMCs arriving in the country "to destabilize the situation during the election campaign", according to the state-owned Belarusian Telegraph Agency (BelTA). The Belarusian Security Council accused those arrested of preparing "a terrorist attack". Radio Liberty reported the contractors were possibly on their way to Sudan, citing video footage that showed Sudanese currency and a telephone card depicting Kassala's Khatmiya Mosque among the belongings of those who had been arrested. Others also believed the contractors were simply using Belarus as a staging post on their way to or from their latest assignment, possibly in Africa, with BBC News pointing out the footage of the Sudanese currency and a Sudanese phone card as well.

Russia confirmed the men were employed by a private security firm, but stated they had stayed in Belarus after missing their connecting flight to Turkey and called for their swift release. The head of the Belarusian investigative group asserted the contractors had no plans to fly further to Turkey and that they were giving "contradictory accounts". The PMCs stated they were on their way to Venezuela, Turkey, Cuba and Syria. Belarusian authorities also said they believed the husband of opposition presidential candidate Sviatlana Tsikhanouskaya may have ties to the detained men and launched a criminal case against him. The detained contractors were returned to Russia two weeks later.

During the contractors' detention, Russian media reported that the Security Service of Ukraine had lured the PMCs to Belarus under the pretext of a contract for the protection of Rosneft facilities in Venezuela. The operation's plan was to force an emergency landing of the contractor's plane from Minsk as it flew through Ukrainian airspace and, once grounded, the PMCs would have been arrested. Later, Russian president Putin also stated that the detained men were victims of a joint Ukrainian-United States intelligence operation. Although the Ukrainian president's chief of staff, Andriy Yermak, denied involvement in the detentions, subsequently, a number of Ukrainian journalists, members of parliament, and politicians confirmed the operation.

The operation was supposedly planned for a year as Ukraine identified PMCs who fought in eastern Ukraine and were involved in the July 2014 shoot down of Malaysia Airlines Flight 17. The operation failed after being postponed by the Office of the President of Ukraine, which was reportedly informed of it only in its final stage. Ukrainian reporter Yuri Butusov accused Andriy Yermak of "betrayal" after he reportedly deliberately released information on the operation to Russia. Butusov further reported that the Turkish intelligence agency MİT was also involved in the operation. The failure of the operation led to firings and criminal proceedings among Ukraine's Security Service personnel, according to a Ukrainian intelligence representative using the pseudonym "Bogdan". Former Ukrainian president Petro Poroshenko also claimed in December 2020 that he sanctioned the operation at the end of 2018.

== Possible activities ==
=== Nagorno-Karabakh ===
Several days after Russian media reported that Russian PMCs were ready to fight against Azerbaijan in Nagorno-Karabakh, a source within the Wagner Group, as well as Russian military analyst Pavel Felgenhauer, reported that Wagner contractors were sent to support the armed forces of the partially recognized Republic of Artsakh against Azerbaijan during the 2020 Nagorno-Karabakh War as ATGM operators. However, Bellingcat reported that the Wagner Group was not present in Nagorno-Karabakh, pointing to the Reverse Side of the Medal (RSOTM) public channel, used by Russian PMCs, including Wagner. RSOTM posted two images and a song alluding to the possibility of Wagner PMCs arriving in Nagorno-Karabakh, but Bellingcat determined the images were unrelated.

Following the end of the war, retired military captain Viktor Zlobov stated Wagner PMCs took a significant role in managing to preserve the territory that remained under Armenian control during the conflict and were the ones mostly responsible for the Armenians managing to keep control of the town of Shusha for as long as they did before it was ultimately captured by Azerbaijan during the major battle that took place. Turkey reported that 380 "blondes with blue eyes" took part in the conflict on the side of Artsakh, while some Russian publications put the number of Wagner PMCs who arrived in the region in early November at 500. 300 of these were said to have taken part in the Battle of Shusha and a photo of a Wagner PMC, apparently taken in front of a church in Shusha during the war, appeared on the internet the following month.

The Russian news outlet OSN reported that the arrival of the PMCs was also one of the factors that led to Azerbaijan's halt of their offensive against Nagorno-Karabakh.

=== Burkina Faso ===
Following more than six years of a Jihadist insurgency in Burkina Faso, a coup d'état took place on 23 January 2022, with the military deposing president Roch Marc Christian Kaboré and declaring that the parliament, government, and constitution had been dissolved. The coup d'état was led by lieutenant colonel Paul-Henri Sandaogo Damiba and came in response to the government's failure to suppress the Islamist insurgency, which has left 2,000 people dead and between 1.4 and 1.5 million displaced. Anger was also directed towards France, which was providing military support to the government.

One day after the coup, Alexander Ivanov, the official representative of Russian military trainers in the CAR, offered training to the Burkinese military. Subsequently, it was revealed that shortly before the military takeover lieutenant-colonel Damiba attempted to persuade President Kaboré to engage the Wagner Group against the Islamist insurgents. In addition, less than two weeks before the takeover, the government announced it had thwarted a coup plot, after which it was speculated that the Wagner Group might try and establish itself in Burkina Faso. The coup found significant support in the country and was followed by protests against France and in support of the takeover, with the protesters calling for Russia to intervene. The United States Department of Defense stated it was aware of allegations that the Wagner Group might have been "a force behind the military takeover in Burkina Faso," but could not confirm if they were true.

On 30 September 2022, a new coup d'état took place that saw Colonel Damiba being deposed by Captain Ibrahim Traoré due to Damiba's inability to contain the jihadist insurgency. According to Traoré, he and other officers had tried to get Damiba to "refocus" on the rebellion, but eventually opted to overthrow him as "his ambitions were diverting away from what we set out to do". Some suspected Traoré of having a connection with Wagner. As Traoré entered Ouagadougou, the nation's capital, supporters cheered, some waving Russian flags. Senior U.S. diplomat Victoria Nuland traveled to Burkina Faso in the wake of Traoré's seizure of power in order to "strongly urge" him not to partner with Wagner.

Still, the Government of Ghana publicly alleged that Traoré began collaborating with the Wagner Group following the coup, enlisting the mercenaries against the jihadist rebels. According to Ghana's president, the ruling junta allocated a mine to the Wagner Group as a form of payment for its deployment, which was denied by Burkina Faso's mines minister. In late January 2023, the ruling junta demanded that France withdraw its troops, numbering between 200 and 400 special forces members, from Burkina Faso, after battling the jihadists for years. France agreed and completed its withdrawal by 19 February 2023.

=== Other ===
A Russian news video claiming to show Serbian "volunteers" being trained by the Wagner Group to fight alongside Russian troops in Ukraine prompted outrage in Serbia. Serbia's president, Aleksandar Vučić, reacted angrily on national TV, asking why the Wagner Group would call on anyone from Serbia when it is against the country's regulations. It is illegal for Serbians to take part in conflicts abroad.

Amid reports in March 2023, claiming Russia was plotting the toppling of the government of Moldova, and a subsequent anti-government demonstration, the Moldovan Border Police reported it had detained and deported an alleged member of the Wagner Group at Chisinau Airport.

The U.S. government shared intelligence with the Chadian government that Wagner is working with rebels in the country to destabilise the government, and is possibly plotting to assassinate the country's president as well as other top government officials. Wagner was allegedly also seeking to forge ties with elements of the Chadian ruling class. An attempt to topple a government represented a watershed for Wagner's influence-building strategy, a U.S. official told The New York Times. The U.S. approach of intelligence sharing to counter Russian threats to sovereign states and subsequent leaks of the intelligence findings reflects a strategy pioneered amid the Russian invasion of Ukraine.

According to information from leaked US intelligence findings, Wagner sought to expand its operations into Haiti, reaching out to the embattled Haitian government with a proposal to combat gangs on behalf of the government.

In June 2023, an email from the Wagner Group suggested that the group had plans involving the Chatham Islands east of the New Zealand mainland, following a television interview with Prigozhin, when a map on the wall behind him had a coloured pin in the position of the islands.

In August 2023, two Russian citizens were detained in Poland after they were spotted placing "Wagner" stickers and other recruitment materials in public places. According to the Polish Police and the Internal Security Agency, the subsequent investigation revealed that these Russian individuals possessed over 3,000 "Wagner" propaganda items and documented placing over 300 of them in various locations in Poland, for which they received 500,000 RUB from Russia.

In September 2024, it was claimed that PMCs from the Wagner Group (now known as “Africa Corps”) had entered Equatorial Guinea at the request of Teodoro Obiang. According to the opposition, the objective of the contractors was to help consolidate a hypothetical succession of Obiang's power to his son, "Teodorín".

== Casualties ==
Conflict	Period	Wagner casualties		Notes
Conflict	Period	Killed	Wounded	Notes
War in Donbas	Jun 2014 – Oct 2015	30–80		The Ukrainian SBU claimed 36 PMCs were killed during the fighting at Luhansk International Airport (15) and the Battle of Debaltseve (21). Four of those who died in the battle for the airport were killed at the nearby village of Khryashchevatoe.
Syrian civil war	Sep 2015 – Dec 2024	346	900+ (Sep 2015 – Dec 2017)	CIT reported a conservative estimate of at least 101 being killed between October 2015 and mid-December 2017. By the end of December 2017, the founder of CIT stated the death toll was at least 100–200, while another CIT blogger said at least 150 were killed and more than 900 were wounded. Fontanka reported a conservative estimate of at least 73 dead by mid-December 2017, 40–60 of which died during the first several months of 2017. A former PMC officer stated no fewer than 100 died by the end of August 2016. BBC News Russian confirmed by names the deaths of 346 PMCs by mid-December 2024, following the Fall of the Assad regime. In addition, three PMCs belonging to the Russian private military company Shield also died mid-June 2019. Two of the three were former Wagner members.
Syrian civil war – Battle of Khasham	7 February 2018	80	100–200	The Ukrainian SBU claimed 80 were killed and 100 wounded, naming 64 of the dead. A source with ties to Wagner and a Russian military doctor claimed 80–100 were killed and 200 wounded. A Russian journalist believed between 20 and 25 died, while similarly CIT estimated a total of between 20 and 30 had died. The Novaya Gazeta newspaper reported 13 dead, while the Baltic separate Cossack District ataman stated no more than 15–20 died. Wagner commanders put the death toll at 14 or 15 at the most. BBC News Russian confirmed by names the deaths of 80 PMCs.
Central African Republic Civil War	Mar 2018–present	33		
Sudanese Revolution	Dec 2018 – Jan 2019	2		
Insurgency in Cabo Delgado	Sep 2019 – Mar 2020	11		
Second Libyan Civil War	Sep 2019 – Oct 2020	21–48		Russian blogger Mikhail Polynkov claimed no less than 100 PMCs had been killed by early April 2020. However, this was not independently confirmed.
Mali War	Dec 2021–present	51–81		The death of one more Russian "mercenary" and two "foreign soldiers", said to be Russian, were also reported in two incidents in January and March 2022.
Russian invasion of Ukraine	24 Feb 2022–present	11,065 (confirmed) 20,000+ (per Prigozhin, in Bakhmut)	20,000+ (per Prigozhin, in Bakhmut)	The Mediazona outlet and BBC News Russian confirmed by names the deaths of 11,065 PMCs, including 8,268 recruited convicts. This number possibly includes members of the PMC Redut, which counts among its members former Wagner commanders, as well as convicts. On 23 May 2024, Prigozhin claimed that 20,000 Wagner fighters were killed in Bakhmut, with as many wounded. However, Russian ultranationalist Igor Girkin claimed that the true figure, based on Prigozhin's claimed strength figures, was over twice as high, estimating a total number of more than 40,000 killed in action.

Families of killed PMCs are prohibited from talking to the media under a non-disclosure that is a prerequisite for them to get compensation from the company. The standard compensation for the family of a killed Wagner employee is up to 5 million rubles (about 80,000 dollars), according to a Wagner official. In contrast, the girlfriend of a killed fighter stated the families are paid between 22,500 and 52,000 dollars depending on the killed PMC's rank and mission. In mid-2018, Russian military veterans urged the Russian government to acknowledge sending private military contractors to fight in Syria, in an attempt to secure financial and medical benefits for the PMCs and their families.

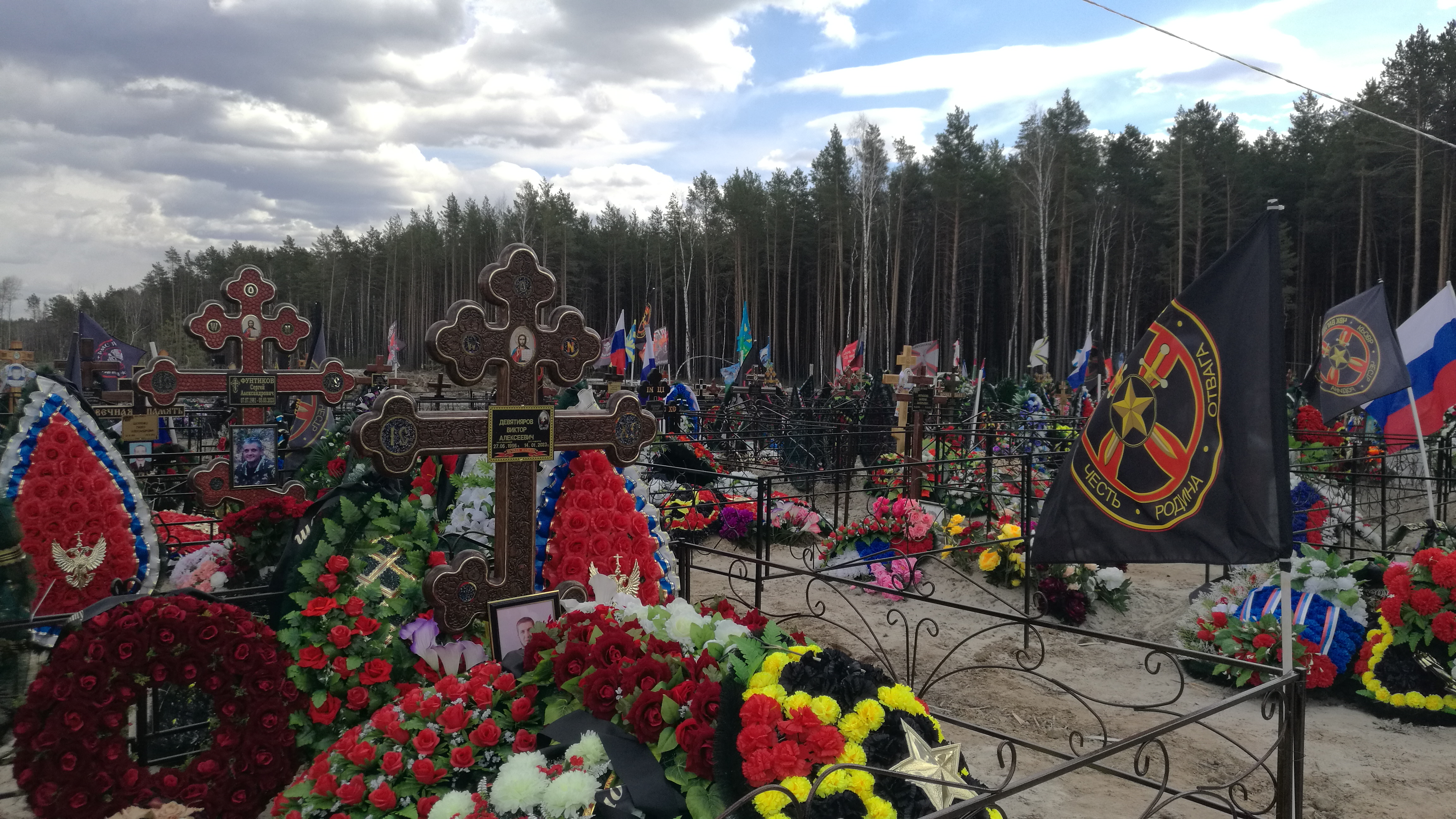
Wagner Group burial section at Chervishevskoye Cemetery, Tyumen, Russia, April 2023

The Sogaz International Medical Centre in Saint Petersburg, a clinic owned by the large insurance company AO Sogaz, has treated PMCs who had been injured in combat overseas since 2016. The company's senior officials and owners are either relatives of Russian president Putin or others linked to him. The clinic's general director, Vladislav Baranov, also has a business relationship with Maria Vorontsova, Putin's eldest daughter.

On 12 April 2018, investigative Russian journalist Maksim Borodin was found badly injured at the foot of his building, after falling from his fifth-floor balcony in Yekaterinburg. He was hospitalized in a coma and died of his injuries three days later on 15 April. In the weeks before his death, Borodin gained national attention when he wrote about the deaths of Wagner PMCs in the battle with US-backed forces in eastern Syria in early February, that also involved US air-strikes.

== Sanctions ==
Prigozhin was sanctioned by the United States Department of the Treasury in December 2016 for Russia's involvement in the war in Ukraine, and by the European Union (EU) and the United Kingdom in October 2020 for links to Wagner activities in Libya.

The US Department of the Treasury also imposed sanctions on the Wagner Group and Utkin personally in June 2017. The designation of the US Department of the Treasury's Office of Foreign Assets Control listed the company and Dmitriy Utkin under the "Designations of Ukrainian Separatists (E.O. 13660)" heading and referred to him as "the founder and leader of PMC Wagner". Further sanctions were implemented against the Wagner Group in September 2018, and July 2020. In December 2021, the EU imposed sanctions against the Wagner Group and eight individuals and three entities connected with it, for committing "serious human rights abuses, including torture and extrajudicial, summary or arbitrary executions and killings, or in destabilising activities in some of the countries they operate in, including Libya, Syria, Ukraine (Donbas) and the Central African Republic."

Following the Russian invasion of Ukraine on 24 February 2022, Canada, Australia, Japan, Switzerland and New Zealand had sanctioned the group. In addition, in late January 2023, the US announced it would designate Wagner as a "significant transnational criminal organization", enabling further tougher sanctions to be implemented against the group.

In early 2023, the US was reported to be working with Egypt and the UAE to put pressure on the military leaders of Sudan and Libya to end their relationship with the Wagner Group and expel them from the countries. The Wagner Group had supported the UAE's and Saudi Arabia's allies in Sudan and Libya. In addition, the Wagner PMCs in Libya were mainly funded by the UAE.

On 4 July 2023, the Parliamentary Assembly of the OSCE recognized Wagner as a terrorist organization and Russia as a state sponsor of terrorism.

On 24 July, the US also sanctioned three Malian officials for facilitating the Wagner Group's operations in their country.

== Far-right elements ==
Various elements of the Wagner Group have been linked to extremism, including white supremacy and neo-Nazism. Some founding members of Wagner belong to the far-right ultranationalist Russian Imperial Movement. Wagner's first commander, Dmitry Utkin, was reportedly a neo-Nazi and had several Nazi tattoos, greeted subordinates by saying "Heil!", wore a Wehrmacht field cap around the unit's training grounds, and occasionally signed his name with the two lightning bolt insignia of the Nazi SS.

In 2021, the Foreign Policy report noted the origin of the name "Wagner" to be unknown. Others say the group's name comes from Utkin's own call sign "Wagner", reportedly after the German composer Richard Wagner, which Utkin is said to have chosen due to his passion for the Third Reich (Wagner being Adolf Hitler's favorite composer). Members of Wagner Group said Utkin was a Rodnover, a follower of Slavic native faith. A Wagner sub-group, "Rusich", was founded by self-proclaimed neo-Nazi Alexey Milchakov and is open about its far-right ideology. Wagner members have also left neo-Nazi graffiti on the battlefield, such as swastikas and the SS emblem.

However, Erica Gaston, a senior policy advisor at the UN University Centre for Policy Research, noted that the Wagner Group is not driven by ideology, but is rather a network of mercenaries "linked to the Russian security state".

== Awards and honors ==
Wagner PMCs have received state awards in the form of military decorations and certificates signed by Russian president Putin. Wagner commanders Andrey Bogatov and Andrei Troshev were awarded the Hero of the Russian Federation honor for assisting in the first capture of Palmyra in March 2016. Bogatov was seriously injured during the battle. Meanwhile, Alexander Kuznetsov and Dmitry Utkin had reportedly won the Order of Courage four times. Family members of killed PMCs also received medals from Wagner itself, with the mother of one killed fighter being given two medals, one for "heroism and valour" and the other for "blood and bravery". A medal for conducting operations in Syria was also issued by Wagner to its PMCs.

In mid-December 2017, a powerlifting tournament was held in Ulan-Ude, capital city of the Russian Republic of Buryatia, which was dedicated to the memory of Vyacheslav Leonov, a Wagner PMC who was killed during the campaign in Syria's Deir ez-Zor province. The same month, Russia's president signed a decree establishing International Volunteer Day in Russia, as per the UN resolution from 1985, which will be celebrated annually every 5 December. The Russian Poliksal news site associated the Russian celebration of Volunteer Day with honoring Wagner PMCs.

In late January 2018, an image emerged of a monument in Syria, dedicated to "Russian volunteers". The inscription on the monument in Arabic read: "To Russian volunteers, who died heroically in the liberation of Syrian oil fields from ISIL". The monument was located at the Haiyan plant, about 50 kilometers from Palmyra, where Wagner PMCs were deployed. An identical monument was also erected in Luhansk in February 2018. In late August 2018, a chapel was built near Goryachy Klyuch, Krasnodar Krai, in Russia in memory of Wagner PMCs killed in fighting against ISIL in Syria. For each of those killed a candle is lit in the chapel. Towards the end of November 2018, it was revealed that a third monument, also identical to the two in Syria and Luhansk, was erected in front of the chapel, which is a few dozen kilometers from the PMC's training facility at Molkin.

The leadership of the Wagner Group and its military instructors were reportedly invited to attend the military parade on 9 May 2018, dedicated to Victory Day.

On 14 May 2021, a Russian movie inspired by the Russian military instructors in the Central African Republic premiered at the national stadium in Bangui. Titled The Tourist, it depicts a group of Russian military advisors sent to the CAR on the eve of presidential elections and, following a violent rebellion, they defend locals against the rebels. The movie was reportedly financed by Prigozhin to improve the Wagner Group's reputation and included some Wagner PMCs as extras. Six months later, a monument to the Russian military was erected in Bangui. In late January 2022, a second movie about the Russian PMCs had its premiere. The film, titled Granit, showed the true story of the contractors' mission to the Cabo Delgado region of Mozambique in 2019, against Islamist militants.

== Death of Yevgeny Prigozhin and aftermath ==
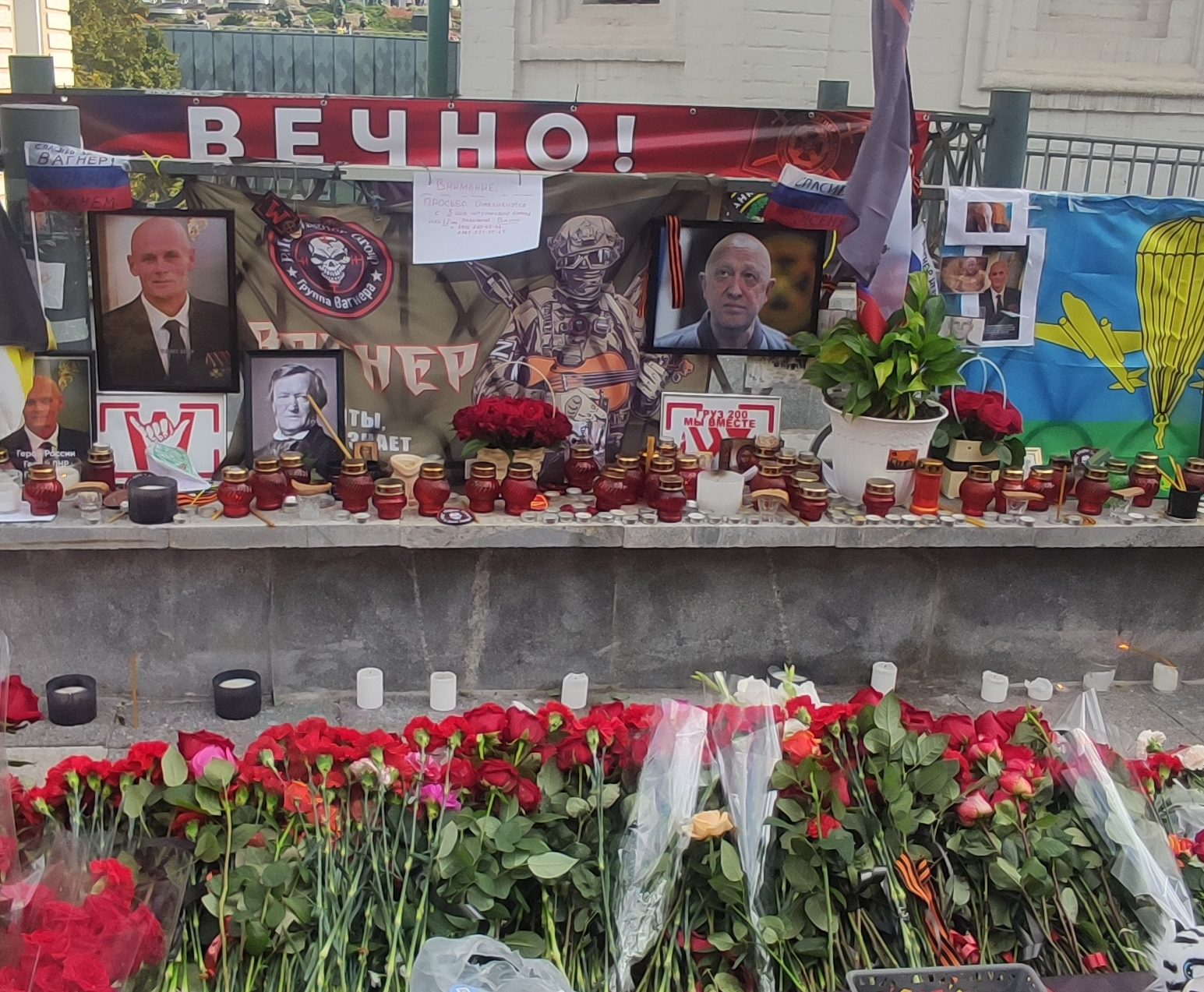
Makeshift memorial to Yevgeny Prigozhin and Dmitry Utkin in Moscow

On 23 August 2023, Wagner leaders Yevgeny Prigozhin and Dmitry Utkin died in a plane crash in Tver Oblast, Russia. While the cause of the crash is unknown, The Wall Street Journal cited sources within the US government as saying that the crash was likely caused by a bomb onboard or "some other form of sabotage". Early reports suggested a missile strike, but the Journal cited three veteran aviation experts who said that the visual evidence indicates a catastrophic structural failure not attributable to a missile. Meduza discounted the possibility of a surface-to-air missile (SAM) strike, saying that the aircraft was flying too high to be hit by a short-range man-portable air-defense system, while a more potent medium-range SAM such as those operated by Russian forces in the area would cause much more severe and readily identifiable damage. The United States Department of Defense press secretary Patrick Ryder said that the Pentagon had no indication that the plane had been shot down by a SAM, calling it false information. Experts consulted by The New York Times said that the size of the debris field – with the fuselage being found some 3 km (2 mi) from the empennage – suggests a catastrophic structural failure that could not be caused by a simple mechanical problem.

On 11 September 2023, Russian media reported that the National Guard, Rosgvardia, had begun recruiting former convicts who served in Ukraine as members of the Wagner Group. On 13 November 2023, it was reported that four former inmates who fought for the Wagner Group in eastern Ukraine, were receiving calls and text messages offering them military contracts. Three of the veterans reported that specifically Rosgvardia was trying to recruit them. A text message said: "Wagner is officially becoming a unit of Rosgvardia...The entire structure, methods of work and commanders remain the same." Other reports indicate that former Wagner fighters have joined Chechen Akhmat units, whilst still wearing Wagner patches.

On 27 September 2023, the Ukrainian military reported that around 500 Wagner Group fighters returned to fight in Donetsk Oblast as part of the group's redeployment in Ukraine for the first time since its failed rebellion against the Russian military establishment in June.

On 29 September 2023, President Putin appointed former Wagner Group commander and retired colonel Andrei Troshev (nom de guerre Sedoi) to oversee volunteer fighter units in Ukraine. In October 2023, pro-Wagner groups reported that Pavel Prigozhin, son of former leader Yevgeny Prigozhin, had been appointed as the new leader of the Wagner Group.

== Notable members ==
- Vladimir Andanov was wanted for a killing in Libya. Andanov was reportedly killed by a Ukrainian sniper in Ukraine.
- Alexey Milchakov
- Andrey Medvedev

== See also ==
- Fakel (company)
- Redut
- List of military units named after people
