= Anton Yelizarov =

Russian military and mercenary leader (born 1981)

- Native name: Антон Олегович Елизаров
- Nickname: Lotos
- Born: Anton Olegovich Yelizarov; 1 May 1981 (age 45); Rostov Oblast, Russian SFSR, Soviet Union
- Allegiance: Russian Armed Forces (1998–2014); Wagner Group (2016–present)
- Branch: VDV (1998–2014)
- Rank: Captain (–2014)
- Commands: Wagner Group (2016–present)
- Conflicts: Second Chechen War; Syrian Civil War; Central African Republic Civil War; Russo-Ukrainian War; Mali War

Anton Olegovich Yelizarov (Note: or Elizarov) (Russian: Антон Олегович Елизаров; born 1 May 1981), also known by his nom de guerre "Lotos" (Russian: Лотос, literally: Lotus), is a Russian mercenary leader and former military officer who serves as one of the senior commanders of the Wagner Group.

Yelizarov is a recipient of several medals for his military service, particularly the Hero of Russia, Donetsk People's Republic and Luhansk People's Republic honorary titles.

== Biography ==
Anton Olegovich Yelizarov was born on 1 May 1981 in the Rostov Oblast, USSR.

In 1998 he graduated from the Ulyanovsk Guards Suvorov Military School. In 2003 he graduated from the Ryazan Guards Higher Airborne Command School. Since 2003, he served as the commander of an airborne platoon in the 7th Guards Air Assault Division.

In 2014, he was dismissed from the army after the verdict of the Krasnodar garrison military court for a crime against property (4.159 CC RF). He received a three-year suspended sentence and paid a fine of one hundred thousand rubles.

After his dismissal, he joined the Wagner Group. He participated in the Russian military intervention in the Syrian civil war. From 2016 to 2019 he was an instructor in the Central African Republic. In 2021, he commanded a stormtrooper detachment in Libya. From the first days of the Russian invasion of Ukraine, he took part in it. Yelizarov led the assault on the city of Soledar and reportedly commanded Wagner forces during the storming of Bakhmut. By a closed decree of Vladimir Putin of 2022 "for courage and heroism" shown in the fighting in Ukraine, he was awarded the title Hero of the Russian Federation.

From 25 February 2023, Yelizarov was under the sanctions of all countries of the European Union.

After the death of Yevgeny Prigozhin in the 23 August 2023 Wagner Group plane crash, a rumor appeared that Yelizarov had become the new commander of Wagner PMC. On 26 August 2023, PMC Wagner denied the appointment of Yelizarov as the new leader. The group's official Telegram channel of "Wagner Orchestra" stated that although Yelizarov actually managed the combat and training work of the company, he was not appointed to the post of head of Wagner. However, at the moment, his position is already the most senior in the organization.

=== Death allegations ===
Some Russian Wagner-affiliated Telegram channels reported that Yelizarov was killed during the battle of Tinzaouaten in July 2024, however his death was not independently confirmed. According to Russian war correspondent Boris Rozhin, known on Telegram as Colonelcassad, Yelizarov was captured and has already been exchanged. There is no reliable and confirmed information about Yelizarov's fate yet.

== Personal life ==
Yelizarov is married and has a daughter.

== Awards ==
- Hero of the Luhansk People's Republic
- Hero of the Donetsk People's Republic
- Hero of the Russian Federation
