= Konstantin Pikalov =

Russian colonel and mercenary (born 1968)

- Константин Александрович Пикалов (Russian)
- Born: Konstantin Aleksandrovich Pikalov; 23 July 1968 (age 58)
- Military career
- Allegiance: Russia; Central African Republic
- Rank: Colonel
- Units: Wagner Group; PMC "Convoy"; Central African Armed Forces (as a mercenary)
- Conflicts: Central African Republic Civil War

Konstantin Aleksandrovich Pikalov (born 23 July 1968), call sign "Mazay", is a Russian colonel and former Wagner Group leader. Head of the group's operations in Africa, he has notably operated in the Central African Republic. He is also the founder of another private military company, "Convoy".

== PMC "Convoy" ==
In 2016, Konstantin Pikalov created "Convoy", a private security company based in Saint Petersburg. "Convoy" has been active primarily in Africa.

In 2023, Pikalov and Sergey Aksyonov founded a new private paramilitary organization separate from Wagner Group, known by the name of a previously existing security company "Convoy". "Convoy" recruits mercenaries for Russian invasion of Ukraine. Following the 2023 Nigerien coup d'état, the Center for Strategic and International Studies reported that the United States could use the fallout of the then-recent Wagner Group rebellion to dislodge "Convoy" control in Africa.
