= Molkin =

Molkin Молькин
- Khutor
- Location within Krasnodar Krai Location within Russia
- Coordinates: 44°48′15″N 39°14′08″E
- Country: Russia
- Region: Krasnodar Krai
- Town: Goryachy Klyuch
- Time zone: UTC+03:00

Molkin (Russian: Молькин) is a rural locality (a (khutor) under the administrative jurisdiction of the Town of Goryachy Klyuch of Krasnodar Krai, Russia. Population: 3,303 (2010 census); 2,196 (2002 census);

== "Molkino" military range ==
To the west of the village there is a military training ground called "Molkino", known for its use for preparation of the Russian military and forces of the Donetsk People's Republic and Luhansk People's Republic for the war against Ukraine. The base is also used as the main training facility for mercenaries of Wagner's PMC.
