= 2023 Wagner Group plane crash =

2023 airliner crash in Russia

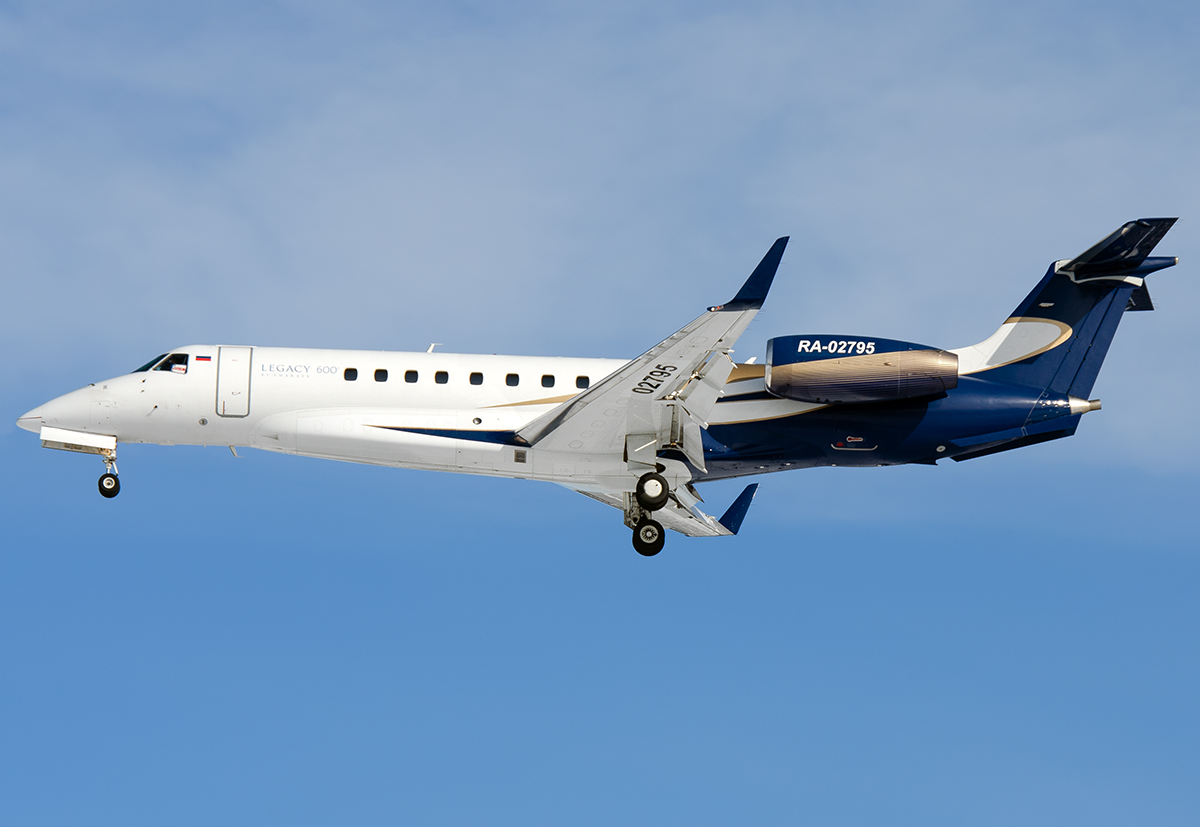
- RA-02795, the aircraft involved, pictured in 2022

Occurrence
- Date: 23 August 2023
- Summary: In-flight breakup
- Site: Kuzhenkino, Tver Oblast, Russia; 57°44′52″N 33°57′15″E

Aircraft
- Aircraft type: Embraer Legacy 600
- Call sign: RA02795
- Registration: RA-02795
- Flight origin: Sheremetyevo International Airport, Moscow, Russia
- Destination: Saint Petersburg, Russia
- Occupants: 10
- Passengers: 7
- Crew: 3
- Fatalities: 10
- Survivors: 0

On 23 August 2023, an Embraer Legacy 600 business jet with ten people on board crashed near Kuzhenkino in Tver Oblast, approximately 100 kilometers (60 mi) north of its departure point in Moscow. Among the victims were Yevgeny Prigozhin, Dmitry Utkin and Valery Chekalov, the key figures of the Wagner Group, a Russian state-funded private military company. The crash prompted speculation that the jet was destroyed on the orders of Russian president Vladimir Putin, after Prigozhin had led the Wagner Group rebellion exactly two months prior.

Tracking data from Flightradar24 showed unusual altitude variations followed by a "dramatic descent" shortly before the plane crashed. Visual evidence suggested structural failure of the aircraft. Western intelligence reported that an explosion likely caused the airplane to crash.

The aircraft, manufactured by Brazilian company Embraer, had been associated with Prigozhin since 2018. It was barred from the United States due to sanctions imposed on Prigozhin after his involvement in the Russian interference in the 2018 United States elections.

While official Russian sources downplayed the crash, some intelligence agencies and international leaders suggested it was a politically motivated assassination. Prigozhin's previous criticism of the Russian Defense Ministry and open rebellion against the Russian government were cited as potential motivations for foul play. The deaths of Prigozhin, Utkin, and Chekalov are among several suspicious Russia-related deaths since 2022.

== Background ==
The Wagner Group, a Russian state-funded private military company led by Yevgeny Prigozhin, had played an important role in the Russian invasion of Ukraine. Prigozhin was a close confidant of Russia's president Vladimir Putin. He began openly criticizing the Russian Defense Ministry for mishandling the war effort, eventually saying their reasons for the invasion were lies. On 23 June 2023, he led the Wagner Group in a one-day rebellion against the Russian Defense Ministry, which was resolved through negotiations that allowed Prigozhin to evade punishment. Some believed that this immunity would not last long, with analysts subsequently regarding him as a "dead man walking". On the day of the crash, Prigozhin was reported to have just returned from a trip to Africa. A posthumously released video of Prigozhin believed to have been filmed days before his death showed him acknowledging threats to his life.

=== Aircraft ===
The Embraer Legacy 600 involved in the crash was produced in 2007 by the Brazilian aircraft manufacturer Embraer. It was originally registered in Slovenia as S5-ALS and then changed operators several times. The aircraft became associated with Prigozhin in 2018 when it was acquired by Autolex Transport of the Seychelles and registered in the Isle of Man as M-SAAN. It was reportedly sold to the Wagner group in September 2020 and transferred to the Russian aircraft register with the tail number RA-02795. The aircraft was barred from entering the United States as part of sanctions, also covering Autolex, imposed by the US Treasury Department on Prigozhin in September 2019 following his participation in Russian interference in the 2018 United States elections. The airplane was also believed to have carried Prigozhin to Belarus following the Wagner Group rebellion.

The aircraft identification codes listed by the US Treasury matched those of the crashed aircraft, with the tail number RA-02795, as listed in the Russian aircraft registry. The Russian Federal Air Transport Agency stated that MNT-Aero LLC, a corporate transportation firm, owned the aircraft.

When asked about the condition of the airplane, Embraer said it had not provided support services for the jet since 2019, citing compliance with sanctions. The crash was the second incident involving a Legacy 600, following a 2006 mid-air collision with Gol Transportes Aéreos Flight 1907 in Brazil, during which the Legacy was damaged but was able to land safely without a casualty, while the commercial airliner crashed, killing all 154 people aboard. That incident was later attributed to human and communication errors. There is no record of any Legacy 600, of which about 300 were built before production stopped in 2020, suffering an accident due to mechanical failure.

== Incident ==
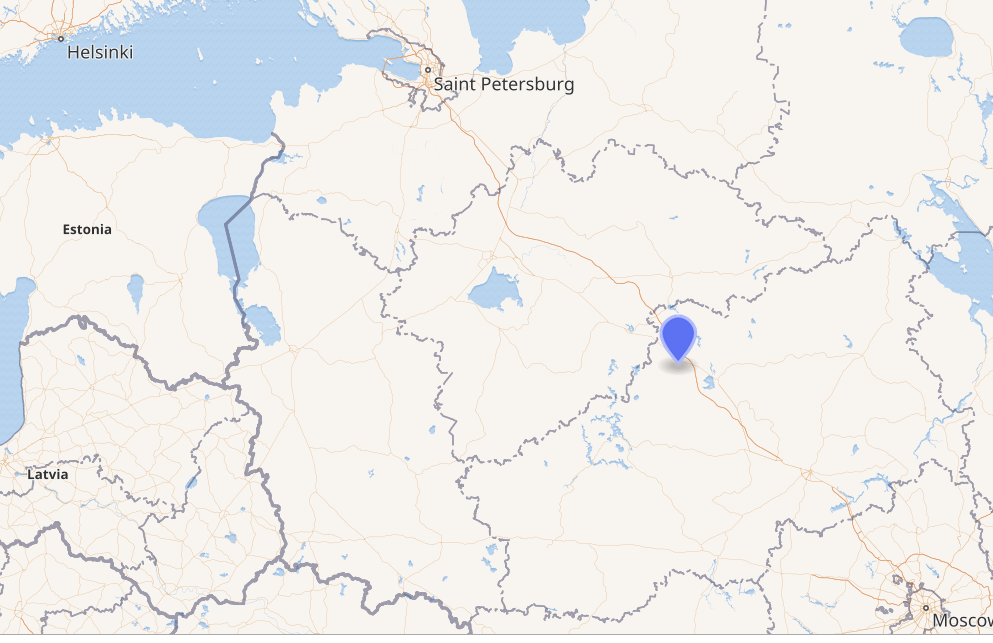
500 km scale map of Tver Oblast, western Russia, showing the orientation of Kuzhenkino to several other political units; Moscow was the origin of the flight, and Saint Petersburg its destination

According to data from Flightradar24, the flight was airborne by 15:00 UTC. By approximately 15:11, it had reached an altitude of 28,000 ft (8,500 m). The aircraft maintained this altitude until 15:19, when it climbed to 30,100 ft (9,200 m). Subsequently, it descended to around 27,500 ft (8,400 m) before ascending again to 29,300 ft (8,900 m). At 15:20:14, when data transmission ceased, the aircraft had descended to 19,725 ft (6,012 m). The airplane crashed near Kuzhenkino in Tver Oblast, about 100 kilometres (62 mi) north of its departure point at Sheremetyevo International Airport in Moscow. Video footage of the incident revealed a vapor trail, a puff of white smoke, and then tilts down to the aircraft in free fall before impact. The airplane appeared to be missing part of its tail and one of its wings. Experts said that the large debris field, with the fuselage being found 3 km (2 mi) from the empennage and a third significant debris site, indicated that the aircraft sustained a catastrophic structural failure that could not be explained by a simple mechanical problem. The left wing was found 3 km (2 mi) from where the main portion of the aircraft fell.

Initial evidence pointed to either a bomb detonating in the aircraft or a surface-to-air missile (SAM) explosion. A Telegram channel linked to the Wagner Group, named Grey Zone, reported that Russian air defenses brought down the jet. The channel claimed that residents near the crash site heard two distinct loud noises before the incident and observed two vapor trails. A source from the Russian government told The Moscow Times that the possibility of a shootdown was being considered due to the crash site's proximity to Vladimir Putin's residence in Valdai. This area hosted multiple divisions of S-300 missile systems, and the nearby Khotilovo and Migalovo airbases were equipped with Pantsir systems. Meduza discounted the possibility of a SAM strike, saying that the reported twin exhaust trails and explosions would suggest that two missiles were fired, a common air-defense tactic intended to guarantee a hit, but Flightradar24 data indicates that the aircraft was flying too high to be hit by a short-range man-portable air-defense system, while a hit from a more potent medium-range SAM – and particularly two of them – would cause much more severe and readily identifiable damage. According to US intelligence, an intentional explosion caused the airplane to crash, and reports of the use of SAMs were inaccurate.

== Passengers and crew ==
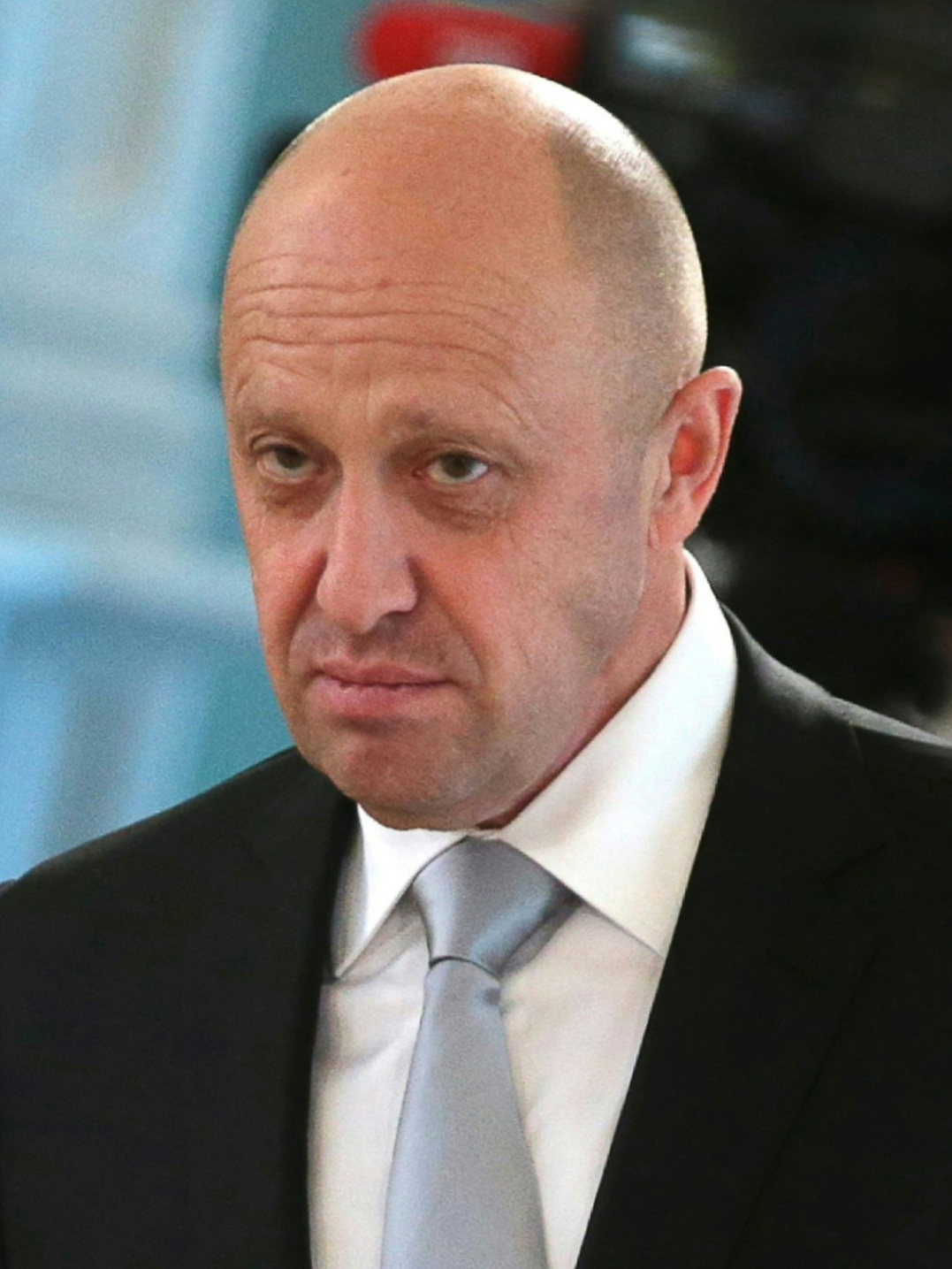
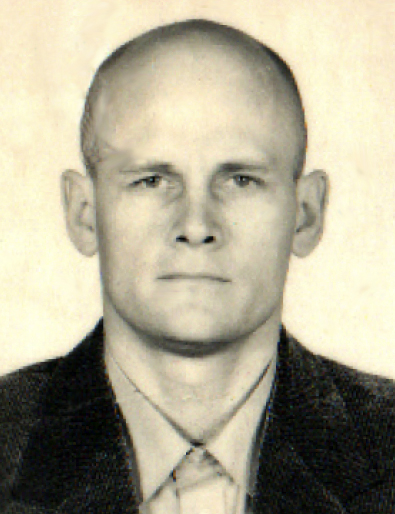
Yevgeny Prigozhin (left) and Dmitry Utkin (right) were among those killed in the crash.

According to the passenger list released by the Federal Air Transport Agency, the airplane carried ten people: seven passengers and three crew members. The passengers were Yevgeny Prigozhin, founder of the Wagner Group; Dmitry Utkin, the Wagner Group's co-founder and leader of military operations; Valery Chekalov, head of security and foreign logistics for the Wagner Group; as well as two Wagner veterans and two of Prigozhin's bodyguards. The flight crew comprised pilot Alexey Levshin, co-pilot Rustam Karimov, and flight attendant Kristina Raspopova.

On 27 August 2023, the Russian Investigative Committee verified the identities of all crash victims through DNA analysis.

== Investigation ==
Following the crash, the remains of all ten people were recovered and were transported to a morgue in Tver for further examination. Other biological materials were taken to Moscow. The extent of their injuries hindered visual identification of the victims, with the bodies being described as charred and mangled. Authorities also reportedly recovered Prigozhin's phone from the crash site. On 25 August, it was reported the flight recorders had been recovered. The Ministry of Emergency Situations initiated an investigation into the incident. Additionally, authorities "opened a criminal case on violation of the rules of traffic safety and operation of air transport." The governor of Tver Oblast, Igor Rudenya, was placed in charge of the investigation.

The Center for Research and Prevention of Aeronautical Accidents (CENIPA) of Brazil (where the aircraft was manufactured) offered assistance to the Russian Interstate Aviation Committee - Commission on Accident Investigation (IAC) under the aegis of Annex 13 of the Convention on International Civil Aviation, commonly known as the 1944 Chicago Convention. Russia declined the offer on 29 August as the flight was a domestic one, which meant that Russia was not obliged to comply with international rules, and left the matter to the Investigative Committee of Russia.

On 5 October, Putin told a meeting of the Valdai Discussion Club in Sochi that the Wagner leaders on the flight may have been using alcohol or drugs and implied that they blew up the jet themselves with their own weapons. He said that hand grenade fragments were found in the bodies; there was no sign of "external impact" to the aircraft; that 10 billion rubles and 5 kilograms (11 lb) of cocaine were found in Prigozhin's office; and that in his opinion, investigators should have performed alcohol and drug tests while autopsying the victims. Putin pointed to foreign intelligence assessments denying a SAM strike as an implicit confirmation of this hypothesis. The Institute for the Study of War (ISW) described Putin's narrative as "bizarre" and said he was blaming the victims to discredit Prigozhin's supporters and deflect blame away from the Russian government.

=== Assessments outside Russia ===
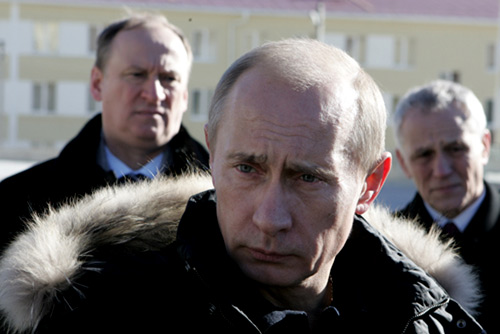
Putin's right-hand man Nikolai Patrushev (left) is believed to have orchestrated the assassination of Yevgeny Prigozhin.

On 24 August, United States Department of Defense press secretary Patrick Ryder stated that the Pentagon had no indication that the airplane carrying Prigozhin had been shot down by a surface-to-air missile, calling it false information. The Wall Street Journal cited sources within the US government as saying that the crash was likely caused by a bomb on board or "some other form of sabotage". The paper also cited three veteran aviation experts who said that given their analysis of the visual evidence available there was no missile strike, but rather a catastrophic structural failure.

On 22 December 2023, The Wall Street Journal cited sources within the Western and Russian intelligence agencies as saying that the crash was orchestrated by Nikolai Patrushev, the head of the Security Council of Russia, who had reportedly warned Putin several times over Prigozhin's outspokenness and had helped secure Belarusian president Aleksandr Lukashenko's assistance in mediating an end to the Wagner Group rebellion in June. The paper alleged that Patrushev presented to Putin a plan to assassinate Prigozhin in August, which led to intelligence officials inserting a bomb under the wing of Prigozhin's plane during pre-departure safety checks.

== Effect on the Wagner Group ==
The ISW assessed that the targeted assassinations would ultimately eliminate the Wagner Group as a substantial threat to Putin.

Shortly before the aircraft crash, Redut, a rival Russian private military outfit, began preparation to enter Africa, focusing recruitment efforts on this area. iStories found posts on social networks urging people to join Redut with this message: "Wagner is in the past. If you are really interested in real work in Africa, the Ministry of Defence and PMC Redut is your choice!".

On 25 August, Belarusian President Aleksandr Lukashenko, who brokered a deal between Putin and Prigozhin to relocate Wagner forces to Belarus in exchange for ending the Wagner Group rebellion, announced that the group would continue to stay in the country and denied reports of its departure.

== Aftermath ==
On 29 August, Prigozhin was buried beside his father in a private ceremony at Porokhovskoye Cemetery in Saint Petersburg. Putin did not attend the funeral. On the same day, Valery Chekalov was buried in Saint Petersburg's Severnoye Cemetery. Sources from the Russian government said that the Russian presidential administration and security services directly interfered with the funeral preparations to minimize publicity and prevent mass gatherings. After memorabilia were stolen from his grave, the site was placed under a 24-hour guard and a surveillance camera was installed nearby. On 31 August, Dmitry Utkin was buried at the Federal Military Memorial Cemetery in Moscow Oblast.

== Reactions ==
=== Domestic ===
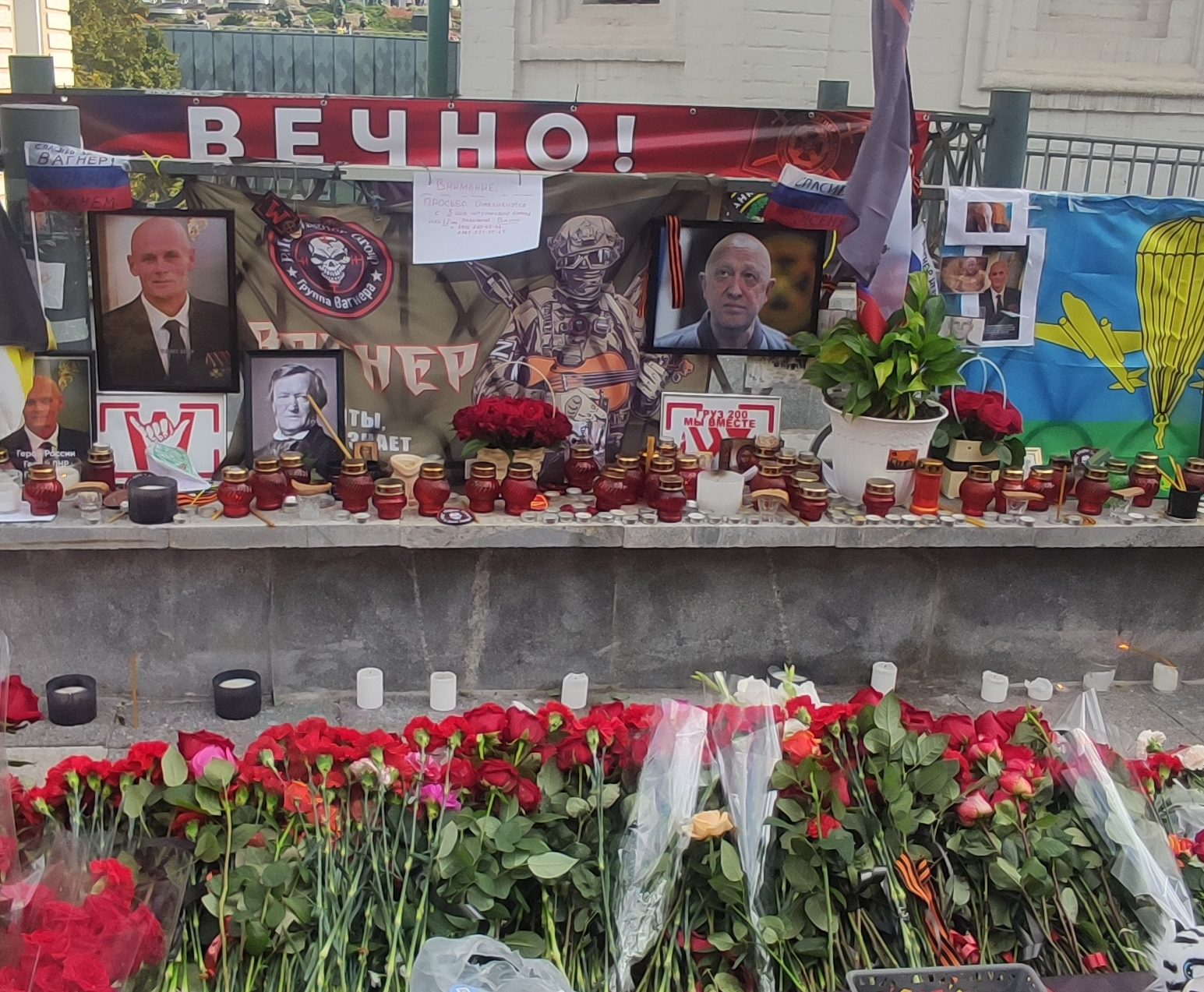
Makeshift memorial to Yevgeny Prigozhin and Dmitry Utkin in Moscow

On Vremya, the flagship news program of the state-controlled Channel One, the disaster's coverage was confined to a 30-second report on that evening's edition. Other state media reported the incident sparingly, voicing the official version of "violation of flight safety procedures". At Wagner Center in Saint Petersburg, flowers and candles were placed at a makeshift shrine, and the building's windows were lit up in the shape of a cross. Grey Zone declared Prigozhin a hero and a patriot who it said had died at the hands of unidentified people whom it called "traitors to Russia". Other makeshift memorials appeared in Moscow, Novosibirsk and Rostov-on-Don, which was occupied by Prigozhin and his forces during the Wagner Group rebellion.

There was no immediate comment regarding the crash from the Kremlin or from Putin, who was at an event commemorating the 80th anniversary of the Battle of Kursk when news of the incident broke out. Prigozhin's press secretary declined to comment on the incident, as did surviving members of the Wagner Council of Commanders. On 24 August, Putin issued a statement which called Prigozhin "a person with a complicated fate", adding that "he made some serious mistakes in life, but also achieved necessary results". On 25 August, Russian presidential spokesperson Dmitry Peskov dismissed speculation over Putin's culpability in the crash as an "absolute lie". He later said that the possibility that the crash was premeditated was not being ruled out.

Pro-Kremlin journalist and RT chief editor Margarita Simonyan said she was "leaning toward the most obvious" version, also alluding to intentional downing. Rossiya-24 host Vladimir Solovyov accused Ukraine and its allies of spreading false news of Prigozhin's death but later retracted his statements. Asked by a journalist for a reaction at the sidelines of the 15th BRICS summit in South Africa, Russian foreign minister Sergei Lavrov refused to comment.

A poll conducted by Alexei Venediktov, former head of the Echo of Moscow radio station, found that 60% of respondents believed Prigozhin's airplane was either shot down or blown up on board, and 17% believed he had staged his own death. Only 1% believed the aircraft crash was accidental.

=== International ===
In response to news of Prigozhin's death, United States president Joe Biden and United States National Security Council spokeswoman Adrienne Watson both stated that the incident came as no surprise. When asked about the attribution of responsibility, Biden added, "There is not much that happens in Russia that Putin is not behind, but I don't know enough to know the answer." White House press secretary Karine Jean-Pierre later said that the Kremlin had "a long history of killing opponents", and that it was "very clear what happened" to Prigozhin.

Mykhailo Podolyak, an adviser to Ukrainian president Volodymyr Zelenskyy, called Prigozhin's death a "demonstrative elimination" and a signal from Putin to Russian elites against disloyalty ahead of the 2024 presidential elections, adding that "Putin does not forgive anyone for his own bestial terror." Zelenskyy denied any involvement by Ukraine in the crash but said "everyone understands" who did it.

Estonian prime minister Kaja Kallas called the crash a reminder of Putin's ability to eliminate opponents and scare off dissent, while Polish foreign minister Zbigniew Rau said that those who threatened Putin's power do not "die naturally" and expressed strong doubts about the crash being accidental. The French government expressed "reasonable doubts" about the cause of the crash, and added that Prigozhin was "the man who did Putin's dirty work" and left behind "mass graves" in Africa, Ukraine, and Russia. Moldovan president Maia Sandu also commented on Prigozhin's death, saying it only confirmed the risks coming from Russia, "a country that has no justice", which extend to its neighboring countries.

Belarusian president Alexander Lukashenko stated he could not "imagine" Putin being responsible for Prigozhin's death, calling a supposed assassination to be "too rough and unprofessional".

== Memorials ==
In April 2024, a monument depicting Prigozhin and Utkin was unveiled outside the Wagner Group's chapel in Goryachy Klyuch, Krasnodar Krai, which contains the largest cemetery for Wagner mercenaries. The municipal government said that the monument was built on private property and did not need authorization from their side.

== See also ==
- 2023 Gao Ilyushin Il-76 crash, the crash of another plane with suspected Wagner ties one month later
- Lin Biao incident (13 September 1971), a suspicious aircraft crash which killed Vice Chairman of the Chinese Communist Party Lin Biao after he allegedly tried to assassinate Mao Zedong
