= Pavel Prigozhin =

Russian businessman and mercenary (born 1998)

- Павел Пригожин

Leader of the Wagner Group
- Incumbent
- Assumed office 1 October 2023
- Preceded by: Yevgeny Prigozhin

Personal details
- Born: 18 June 1998 (age 28) Saint Petersburg, Russia
- Spouse: Yekaterina Sergeyevna Inkina
- Parent: Yevgeny Prigozhin (father)
- Awards: Black Cross (PMC Wagner)

Military service
- Allegiance: Russia
- Rank: General Commander
- Commands: Wagner Group
- Battles/wars: Russo-Ukrainian War; Russian invasion of Ukraine
- Business information
- Organizations: Wagner Group; Concord Management and Consulting

Pavel Yevgenyevich Prigozhin (Note: In this name that follows East Slavic naming customs, the patronymic is Yevgenyevich and the family name is Prigozhin.) (Russian: Павел Евгеньевич Пригожин, born 18 June 1998) is a Russian businessman and mercenary who has led the Wagner Group since 2023. The son of prominent oligarch and mercenary leader Yevgeny Prigozhin, he succeeded his father as the leader of the Wagner Group a month and a half after the 2023 Wagner Group plane crash.

== Early life ==
Pavel Prigozhin was born on 18 June 1998 (or in 1996, according to other sources) in the family of businessman Yevgeny Prigozhin. He is the middle child in the family, growing up with his sisters Polina and Veronika.

The Prigozhin family avoided publicity for a long time; Yevgeny Prigozhin did not disclose details of the personal lives of his relatives. Episodes from Pavel's biography rarely appeared in the media; sometimes his father talked about him.

According to Yevgeny Prigozhin, his son served in draft military service, then signed a contract with his father's company. Several photographs of Pavel in American military equipment have been published; his business trips included Syria and Russian-occupied parts of Ukraine. As part of Wagner Group, he performed the functions of a reconnaissance officer and drone operator, and was awarded the Black Cross medal.

== Business career ==
Pavel Prigozhin's entrepreneurial career started in 2018, when he became the founder of the Beta company. Gradually his business expanded, and since 2020 he has headed Lakhta Plaza. Prigozhin Jr. has connections with the Colors of Life art gallery, headed by Violetta Prigozhina, mother of Yevgeny Prigozhin.

Yevgeny Prigozhin placed Pavel on charge of real estate owned by the family holding company when Pavel was 20 years old.

Pavel Prigozhin cooperates with the oil and gas corporation Gazprom; his companies are involved in the construction of luxury real estate in Saint Petersburg. He is also the owner of Lakhta Park, a large housing complex.

== Wagner Group leadership ==
On 23 August 2023, a business jet crashed near Kuzhenkino in Tver Oblast. Among the ten victims were Yevgeny Prigozhin, Dmitry Utkin, and Valery Chekalov, the key figures of the Wagner Group. After the crash, Wagner's leadership structure became unclear.

On 1 October 2023, the contents of Yevgeny Prigozhin's will became known, in which he bequeathed all property to his son, Pavel Prigozhin. Pavel Prigozhin became the sole heir to his father's business.

According to the Institute for the Study of War (ISW), in early October, Pavel Prigozhin took command of the Wagner Group and was negotiating with the National Guard of Russia to have the group return to combat in Ukraine. ISW said the alleged events surrounding Pavel Prigozhin indicate that "some Wagner employees are interested in rallying around a Prigozhin-linked alternative to the Kremlin and MoD-backed Andrei Troshev, even if that alternative is not an independent organization". An ISW source connected to Wagner added that the group's fighters will not have to sign contracts with the Russian Ministry of Defense and that the mercenary group will retain its name, symbols, ideology and commanders under the leadership of Pavel Prigozhin.

== International sanctions ==
On 3 March 2022, the European Union introduced personal sanctions against Pavel Prigozhin.

== Personal life ==
Pavel Prigozhin is married to Yekaterina Inkina, the daughter of Sergey Inkin, a restaurateur and owner of a concert venue. The family lives in the elite village of Northern Versailles near Saint Petersburg.

His social media content depicts an extravagant lifestyle, with Prigozhin on private jets and the family's superyacht.
