= Criminal charges brought in the Mueller special counsel investigation =

People and organizations charged

The Special Counsel investigation was a United States law enforcement and counterintelligence investigation of the Russian government's efforts to interfere in United States politics and any possible involvement by members of the 2016 Trump presidential campaign. It was primarily focused on the 2016 presidential election.

The Special Counsel initiated criminal proceedings against 34 people—seven U.S. nationals, 26 Russian nationals, and one Dutch national—and three Russian organizations. The charges were brought in three different jurisdictions: the District of Columbia (D.D.C.), the Eastern District of Virginia (E.D. Va.), and the Southern District of New York (S.D.N.Y.). Several cases were also referred to other prosecutors, resulting in charges against two individuals. The Special Counsel indictments have resulted in convictions, plea deals, and jail time in several cases.

== Table of charges ==
Accused	Date first charged	Charge(s)	Case status	Jurisdiction + Indictment
George Papadopoulos	October 3, 2017	1 count: false statements	Pleaded guilty on October 5, 2017. Sentenced to 14 days in prison, a $9,500 fine, 200 hours of community service and 12 months probation on September 7, 2018. Released from prison on December 7, 2018, after serving 12 days of the 14-day sentence. Pardoned by Trump on December 22, 2020.	D.D.C.
Rick Gates	October 27, 2017 (Note: An 8-count indictment issued on October 27, 2017, was superseded by the current information on February 23, 2018.)	2 counts: conspiracy against the United States and false statements	Pleaded guilty on February 23, 2018. Sentenced to 45 days in prison, three years of probation, 300 hours of community service, and a $20,000 fine, on December 17, 2019.	D.D.C.
Rick Gates	February 22, 2018	23 counts: assisting in the preparation of false tax returns (×5), subscribing to false tax returns (×5), filing a false amended return, failure to report foreign bank and financial accounts (×3), bank fraud conspiracy (×5), and bank fraud (×4)	Charges dismissed without prejudice on February 27, 2018.	E.D. Va.
Paul Manafort	October 27, 2017 (Note: A 9-count indictment issued on October 27, 2017, a 5-count indictment issued on February 23, 2018, and a 7-count indictment issued on June 8, 2018, were superseded by the current information on September 14, 2018.)	2 counts: conspiracy against the United States and conspiracy to obstruct justice	Pleaded guilty on September 14, 2018. Sentenced to 73 months in prison on March 13, 2019. (Note: 30 months will be served concurrently with his E.D. Va. sentence. Manafort's total prison time will be 90 months.) Released early on May 13, 2020, to spend the remainder of the sentence in home confinement. Pardoned by Trump on December 23, 2020.	D.D.C.
Paul Manafort	February 22, 2018	18 counts: filing false tax returns (×5), failure to report foreign bank and financial accounts (×4), bank fraud conspiracy (×5), and bank fraud (×4)	Found guilty on 8 counts, mistrial declared on 10 counts on August 21, 2018. Sentenced to 47 months in prison on March 7, 2019. (Note: 30 months will be served concurrently with his D.D.C. sentence. Manafort's total prison time will be 90 months.) Released early on May 13, 2020, to spend the remainder of the sentence in home confinement.	E.D. Va.
Michael Flynn	November 30, 2017	1 count: false statements	Pleaded guilty on December 1, 2017. Charges dismissed on May 7, 2020 (Flynn had previously requested a withdrawal of his guilty plea), but reinstated on August 31, 2020. Pardoned by Trump on November 25, 2020.	D.D.C.
Richard Pinedo	February 7, 2018	1 count: identity fraud	Pleaded guilty on February 12, 2018. Sentenced to six months in prison, followed by six months of home confinement on October 10, 2018. Released from prison on May 13, 2019.	D.D.C.
Alex van der Zwaan	February 16, 2018	1 count: false statements	Pleaded guilty on February 16, 2018. Sentenced to 30 days in prison and a $20,000 fine on April 3, 2018. Released from prison on June 4, 2018; deported to the Netherlands on June 5, 2018. Pardoned by Trump on December 22, 2020.	D.D.C.
Dzheykhun Aslanov; Gleb Vasilchenko; Internet Research Agency LLC	February 16, 2018	8 counts: conspiracy to defraud the United States, conspiracy to commit wire fraud and bank fraud, and aggravated identity theft (×6)	At large outside U.S. jurisdiction	D.D.C.
Irina Kaverzina; Vladimir Venkov	February 16, 2018	7 counts: conspiracy to defraud the United States, and aggravated identity theft (×6)	At large outside U.S. jurisdiction	D.D.C.
Anna Bogacheva; Maria Bovda; Robert Bovda; Mikhail Burchik; Mikhail Bystrov; Aleksandra Krylova; Vadim Podkopaev; Sergey Polozov; Yevgeny Prigozhin; Concord Catering	February 16, 2018	1 count: conspiracy to defraud the United States	At large outside U.S. jurisdiction	D.D.C.
Concord Management and Consulting LLC	February 16, 2018	1 count: conspiracy to defraud the United States	Pleaded not guilty on May 9, 2018. Charges dismissed with prejudice on March 16, 2020.	D.D.C.
Konstantin Kilimnik	June 8, 2018	2 counts: obstruction of justice and conspiracy to obstruct justice	At large outside U.S. jurisdiction	D.D.C.
Boris Antonov; Dmitriy Badin; Nikolay Kozachek; Aleksey Lukashev; Artem Malyshev; Sergey Morgachev; Viktor Netyksho; Aleksey Potemkin; Ivan Yermakov; Pavel Yershov	July 13, 2018	10 counts: conspiracy to commit an offense against the United States, aggravated identity theft (×8), and conspiracy to launder money	At large outside U.S. jurisdiction	D.D.C.
Aleksandr Osadchuk	July 13, 2018	11 counts: conspiracy to commit an offense against the United States (×2), aggravated identity theft (×8), and conspiracy to launder money	At large outside U.S. jurisdiction	D.D.C.
Anatoliy Kovalev	July 13, 2018	1 count: conspiracy to commit an offense against the United States	At large outside U.S. jurisdiction	D.D.C.
Michael Cohen	November 29, 2018	1 count: false statements	Pleaded guilty on November 29, 2018. Sentenced to 2 months in prison on December 12, 2018. (Note: His sentence will be served concurrently with his 3-year sentence for campaign finance, tax evasion, and other charges.) Released early on May 21, 2020, to spend the remainder of the sentence in home confinement.	S.D.N.Y.
Roger Stone	January 24, 2019	7 counts: obstruction of proceeding, false statements (×5), witness tampering	Found guilty on all counts on November 15, 2019. Sentenced to 40 months in federal prison, a $20,000 fine, and two years of supervised release on February 20, 2020. Sentence commuted on July 10, 2020. Pardoned by Trump on December 23, 2020.	D.D.C.

== Parties charged ==
=== George Papadopoulos ===
On October 30, 2017, it was revealed that Trump campaign foreign policy advisor George Papadopoulos had pleaded guilty earlier in the month to making a false statement to FBI investigators, a felony. The guilty plea was part of a plea bargain in which he agreed to cooperate with the government and "provide information regarding any and all matters as to which the Government deems relevant."

On December 30, 2017, The New York Times reported that Papadopoulos had in May 2016 disclosed to the Australian High Commissioner to the United Kingdom Alexander Downer in Kensington Wine Rooms, a London wine bar, that the Russians possessed a large trove of stolen Hillary Clinton emails that could potentially damage her presidential campaign. Australia officials initially did not convey this information to the American counterparts but did so after WikiLeaks and DCLeaks released stolen Democratic National Committee emails in June/July 2016, which American intelligence has concluded with "high confidence" originated from Russian hackers. The hacking, and the revelation that a member of the Trump campaign apparently had inside information about it, were driving factors that led the FBI in July 2016 to open an investigation into Russia's attempts to disrupt the election and whether any of President Trump's associates conspired. The Nunes memo confirmed that the Papadopolous matter triggered the investigation—and not the Steele dossier, which some Republicans had alleged to have been the trigger. Indeed, Papadopoulos was surveilled by Stefan Halper and Jeff Wiseman, the first worked for Steele.

Papadopoulos was recruited to the Trump campaign in early March 2016. In a court document filed as part of Papadopoulos's guilty plea, prosecutors asserted that later in March while traveling in Italy he met Joseph Mifsud, a London-based academic with contacts in the Russian Ministry of Foreign Affairs. Mifsud showed little interest in Papadopoulos until Mifsud learned Papadopoulos was a member of the Trump campaign. Several days later, Papadopoulos met in London with Mifsud and "Olga Polonskaya", a Russian national whom Papadopoulos initially but falsely believed was Vladimir Putin's niece. Papadopoulos then emailed his Trump campaign supervisor Sam Clovis about his meetings, which he said included the Russian Ambassador, and which had been about a "meeting between us and the Russian leadership to discuss U.S.-Russia ties under President Trump." Clovis was non-committal but replied "Great work." In subsequent days Papadopoulos worked with Mifsud and Polonskaya to arrange contacts between the Russian Ministry of Foreign Affairs and the Trump campaign. In late April 2016, Papadopoulos emailed an unnamed Trump campaign "Senior Policy Advisor," stating "The Russian government has an open invitation by Putin for Mr. Trump to meet him when he is ready." At about the same time, Mifsud told Papadopoulos that the Russian government had "dirt" on Hillary Clinton in the form of "thousands of emails," which Papadopoulos then shared with Alexander Downer in a London bar days later. Mifsud dropped from sight after his name appeared in published reports in October 2017 and has not been heard from through May 2018. Stephan Roh, a German national who is a close associate of Mifsud, asserts he was detained, questioned and surveilled by FBI agents after he arrived on a flight to New York in 2017. The BBC reported on March 21, 2018, that Roh and another man named Ivan Timofeev were also involved in Papadopoulos's efforts to contact Russian officials.

For several weeks prior to his scheduled sentencing, his wife had been saying publicly that he might reconsider his guilty plea and its agreement to cooperate with prosecutors. On August 17, Mueller recommended to the judge that Papadopoulos be sentenced to up to 6 months in prison for lying to the FBI. The recommendation commented that "The defendant's crime was serious and caused damage to the government's investigation into Russian interference in the 2016 presidential election", adding that he did not provide "substantial assistance" to the prosecution, but instead withheld information. On August 29, his wife said he has decided to stick with his plea agreement. On September 7, 2018, Papadopoulos was sentenced to 14 days in jail, plus 200 hours of community service, one year of probation and a $9,500 fine. He began serving his 14-day sentence on November 26, 2018, at FCI Oxford in Oxford, Wisconsin, and was released 12 days later on December 7, 2018.

=== Paul Manafort and Rick Gates ===
Plea agreement by Paul Manafort providing full cooperation with the Special Counsel

The two criminal trials of Paul Manafort are the first cases brought to trial by the special counsel's investigation into Russian interference in the 2016 presidential election. Manafort served as campaign chair for the Donald Trump 2016 presidential campaign from June 20 to August 19, 2016.

In July 2017, the FBI conducted a raid of Manafort's home, authorized by search warrant under charges of interference in the 2016 election. Manafort and his business assistant Rick Gates were both indicted and arrested in October 2017 for charges of conspiracy against the United States, making false statements, money laundering, and failing to register as foreign agents for Ukraine. Gates entered a plea bargain in February 2018.

Manafort's first trial on 18 criminal counts began on July 31, 2018. In that trial, Gates testified that he committed tax-evasion and embezzlement crimes with Manafort. Under cross examination, Gates also admitted to an extramarital relationship funded with money embezzled from Manafort. Manafort was found guilty on eight counts (covering filing false tax returns, bank fraud, and failing to disclose a foreign bank account), but a mistrial was declared on the remaining 10 counts due to a single juror harboring reasonable doubts.

During his second trial, Manafort pleaded guilty to two counts: conspiracy to defraud the United States and witness tampering. He further admitted to the remaining charges against him, agreed to forfeit several properties and accounts, and agreed to full cooperation with the prosecution. Manafort has reportedly met with prosecutors nearly a dozen times. But in November 2018 it was reported that Manafort is not being as forthcoming as FBI investigators want and that they are "not getting what they want" from him. The reported breakdown in cooperation followed the firing of Jeff Sessions as attorney general and the appointment of Matthew Whittaker, a critic of the Mueller investigation, as acting attorney general.

Mueller's office stated in a November 26, 2018, court filing that Manafort had repeatedly lied about a variety of matters, breaching the terms of his plea agreement. Manafort's attorneys disputed the assertion. Both sides agreed they were at an impasse and asked Judge Amy Berman Jackson to set a sentencing date for Manafort's trial convictions and guilty pleas.

The New York Times reported on November 27, 2018, that Manafort attorney Kevin Downing continued sharing information about Manafort's legal matters with Trump's attorneys, pursuant to a joint defense agreement, for two months after Manafort had entered a plea and cooperation agreement with Mueller prosecutors. Although such joint defense agreements are not unusual or unlawful, they must be stopped if they create a conflict of interest, as it would be unethical for attorneys to collaborate when one of their clients is cooperating with prosecutors while another client is the subject of a continuing investigation. Legal experts noted that under joint defense privilege rules, once attorneys cease sharing a "common interest" of mutual defense, as in Manafort's case, attorney–client privilege is forfeited and the attorneys can be compelled to testify about what they discussed, opening the possibility of obstruction of justice or witness tampering. Attorneys for Michael Flynn had ended their joint defense agreement with Trump's attorneys when Flynn entered plea negotiations with Mueller.

On March 7, 2019, Manafort was sentenced to 47 months in prison for the charges stemming from the trial held in the Eastern District of Virginia. Trump said he felt "very badly" for Manafort and praised him for resisting the pressure to cooperate with prosecutors. According to Rudy Giuliani, Trump's personal attorney, Trump had sought advice about pardoning Manafort but was counseled against it.

Nine months later, on December 17, 2019, Gates was sentenced to 45 days in prison, 300 hours of community service, and a $20,000 fine, as well as three years of probation, significantly lower than the advisory sentencing guidelines.

=== Michael Flynn ===
As part of the investigation, Mueller assumed control of a Virginia-based grand jury criminal probe into the relationship between retired general Michael Flynn and Turkish businessman Kamil Ekim Alptekin. Flynn Intel Group, an intelligence consultancy, was paid $530,000 by Alptekin's company Inovo BV to produce a documentary and conduct research on Fethullah Gülen, an exiled Turkish cleric who lives in the United States. The special prosecutor is investigating whether the money came from the Turkish government, and whether Flynn kicked funds back to a middleman to conceal the payment's original source. Investigators are also looking at Flynn's finances more generally, including possible payments from Russian companies and from the Japanese government. White House documents relating to Flynn have been requested as evidence. The lead person within Mueller's team for this investigation is Brandon Van Grack. Flynn's son, Michael G. Flynn, is also a subject of the investigation. He worked closely with his father's lobbying company, the Flynn Intel Group, and accompanied his father on his 2015 visit to Moscow.

On November 5, 2017, NBC News reported that Mueller had enough evidence for charges against Flynn and his son. NBC News reported on November 22, 2017, that former Flynn business partner Bijan Kian is a subject of the Mueller investigation. In late November 2017, Flynn's defense team stopped sharing information with Trump's team of lawyers, which was interpreted as a sign that Flynn was cooperating and negotiating a plea bargain with the special counsel team. On December 1, 2017, Michael Flynn agreed to a plea bargain with Mueller. He appeared in federal court to plead guilty to a single felony count of "willfully and knowingly" making "false, fictitious and fraudulent statements" to the FBI and to confirm his intention to cooperate with Mueller's investigation, including "participating in covert law enforcement activities." As part of Flynn's plea bargain, his son Michael G. Flynn is not expected to be charged. On January 31, 2018, the Mueller team advised a federal court that they will not be ready to request sentencing of Flynn until at least May 1, 2018; and on that day, the special counsel requested an extension to June 29, 2018. On that date, Mueller requested another extension, to August 24, 2018. Another postponement was requested on August 21, 2018, to September 17. On that date, the Mueller and Flynn legal teams requested Flynn be sentenced in late November 2018.

In a sentencing memorandum released on December 4, 2018, the Mueller investigation stated Flynn "deserves credit for accepting responsibility in a timely fashion and substantially assisting the government" and should receive little or no jail time.

Flynn's attorneys submitted a sentencing memo on December 11, 2018, requesting leniency and suggesting FBI agents had tricked him into lying during a White House interview on January 24, 2017, and did not advise him that lying to federal agents is a felony. The memo also asserted that Flynn's relaxed behavior during the interview indicated he was being truthful. Trump echoed this assertion two days later on Twitter and Fox News, asserting, "They convinced him he did lie, and he made some kind of a deal." Mueller's office rejected these assertions the next day, stating agents had told Flynn portions of what he had discussed with Russian ambassador Sergei Kislyak to jog his memory, but Flynn did not waver from his false statements. FBI agents concluded that Flynn's relaxed behavior during the interview was actually because he was fully committed to his lies and therefore could be compromised by the Kremlin. Mueller's office also documented instances when Flynn lied about the Kislyak conversation during the days before the FBI interview. Presiding judge Emmet Sullivan ordered documents related to the interview be provided to him prior to Flynn's December 18 sentencing, and could ask Flynn why he chose to raise this issue so late into his prosecution, after Mueller's office had recommended he receive little or no jail time. The New York Times reported that Flynn's "decision to attack the FBI in his own plea for probation appeared to be a gambit for a pardon from Mr. Trump, whose former lawyer had broached the prospect last year with a lawyer for Mr. Flynn."

At Flynn's scheduled sentencing on December 18, Sullivan sharply rebuked him, stating, "I cannot assure that if you proceed today you will not receive a sentence of incarceration," offering to delay the sentencing until Flynn's cooperation with investigators was complete. After conferring with his attorneys, Flynn accepted the offer. During the hearing, Sullivan indicated he was offended by the suggestion in the sentencing memo submitted by Flynn's attorneys that the FBI had misled Flynn, as it created an appearance that Flynn wanted to both accept a generous plea deal from prosecutors while also contending he had been entrapped. Sullivan asked several questions of Flynn's attorney, Robert Kelner, to determine if the defense was maintaining that the FBI had acted improperly in its investigation of Flynn, including whether he had been entrapped. Kelner responded, "No, your honor" to each question. Flynn acknowledged to Sullivan that he was aware that lying to federal investigators was a crime at the time of his initial FBI interview in January 2017.

On May 7, 2020, following the revelation that FBI officials were attempting to coerce Flynn into lying, the DOJ controversially motioned to drop the case with prejudice. The federal judge, however, refused to grant the motion as Flynn had already pled guilty. Flynn's counsel, with assistance from the DOJ, later filed a mandamus in an attempt to force the Judge to dismiss the case. Ultimately, the United States Court of Appeals for the District of Columbia Circuit granted the mandamus and ordered the judge to dismiss the case. Soon afterward, the United States Court of Appeals for the District of Columbia Circuit agreed to re-hear the case en banc to either affirm the dismissal or reject it, which was considered notable by observers as en banc reviews are rarely granted.

On August 31, 2020, the appellate court ruled the mandamus was improperly granted and reversed it. Flynn's appeal was rejected, and the initial federal judge was given leeway on whether to drop or uphold the charges.

Trump pardoned Flynn on November 25, 2020.

=== Richard Pinedo ===
On February 16, 2018, Mueller's office unsealed an indictment which revealed that Richard "Ricky" Pinedo Jr., of Santa Paula, California, accepted a plea agreement on February 2, in which he pleaded guilty to identity fraud, and using the identity of other persons for "unlawful activity", both felonies. Pinedo also agreed to cooperate with the investigation, but faced up to fifteen years in federal prison and a fine of $250,000. Pinedo had operated Auction Essistance, a web-based business that brokered bank account numbers, enabling people who had been barred from websites like eBay and PayPal to return to those websites under a different identity. He does not have a prior criminal history. On October 10, 2018, Pinedo was sentenced by United States District Judge Dabney L. Friedrich to six months in prison, followed by six months of home confinement.

Pinedo was released from prison in May 2019.

=== Alex van der Zwaan ===
On February 16, 2018, Mueller charged attorney Alex van der Zwaan with one count of making false statements to the FBI with respect to van der Zwaan's communications with Gates and another individual identified as "Person A", believed to be Konstantin Kilimnik, in addition to deleting email sought by investigators. Van der Zwaan has worked with Manafort and Gates in 2012 on Ukraine-related matters. Van der Zwaan is the son-in-law of German Khan, who owns Russia's Alfa-Bank along with Mikhail Fridman and Petr Aven, three men named in the Steele dossier.

Van der Zwaan pleaded guilty on February 20, 2018; the guilty plea did not include an agreement to cooperate with the Mueller investigation. On March 27, 2018, Mueller's office asked a judge to consider jail time for van der Zwaan. His sentencing hearing was held on April 3, 2018, and he was sentenced to 30 days in prison followed by two months of supervised release, and fined $20,000. Judge Amy Berman Jackson stated that van der Zwaan, whose pregnant wife is due to give birth in August, can have his passport back after his 30-day sentence, at which point he can self-deport back to Europe if Immigrations and Customs Enforcement allows.

Van der Zwaan was released from prison on June 4 to ICE custody and was deported the next day.

=== Internet Research Agency, et al. ===
Deputy Attorney General Rod Rosenstein announces indictments of 13 Russian individuals and three Russian companies.

On February 16, 2018, special counsel Robert Mueller's team announced it had filed an indictment of 13 Russian nationals and three Russian organizations. The indictment alleges that Yevgeny Prigozhin, a businessman with close ties to Russian President Vladimir Putin, funneled significant funds to Internet Research Agency, a Kremlin-linked company headquartered in Saint Petersburg and described as a "troll factory", for the purposes of carrying out a secret operation to influence the outcome of the 2016 United States presidential election while obstructing the enforcement of federal elections laws. The indictment alleges that members of the conspiracy travelled to the United States to conduct research; created social media accounts impersonating Americans; opened financial accounts with the stolen identities of Americans; bought advertisements on social media platforms; organized and financed political rallies; and posted and promoted material favorable to Donald Trump, while saying not to denigrate Jill Stein, and Bernie Sanders because "they liked them", while disparaging candidates like Hillary Clinton, Marco Rubio, and Ted Cruz. The indictment cites one case in which the defendants and their co-conspirators paid a U.S. person to build a cage on a flatbed truck and paid another U.S. person to wear a costume portraying Hillary Clinton in a prison uniform for a pro-Trump political rally in Florida. Reporters have since contacted some of those "unwitting" Americans. The man who built the cage says he often spoke on the phone with the group that paid him for it, and he never suspected he was dealing with Russians until the FBI contacted him months later.

The indictment's allegations that Russians were actively interfering in the 2016 election process contradict President Trump's repeated assertions that Russian interference was a "hoax" devised by Democrats or perpetrated by others, such as China. Historically, Russia is second only to the United States in foreign election intervention and is therefore statistically the most probable perpetrator against the United States.

=== Konstantin Kilimnik ===
A long-time associate of Paul Manafort, Konstantin Kilimnik was charged on June 8, 2018, on two counts, both relating to obstruction of justice. A Russian national, he is believed to be in Moscow, where he may have ties to Russian intelligence. Per a 2018 classified State Department assessment Ukraine's former Prosecutor General Yuri Lutsenko allowed Kilimnik to escape from Ukraine to Russia after the US federal grand jury charged Kilimnik with obstruction of justice.

The New York Times reported on August 31, 2018, that an unnamed Russian political operative and a Ukrainian businessman had illegally purchased four tickets to the inauguration of Donald Trump on behalf of Kilimnik. The tickets, valued at $50,000, were purchased with funds that had flowed through a Cypriot bank account. The transaction was facilitated by Sam Patten, an American lobbyist who had related work with Paul Manafort and pleaded guilty to failing to register as a foreign agent. Patten agreed to cooperate with Mueller's office and other law enforcement authorities.

=== Viktor Netyksho, et al. ===
Deputy Attorney General Rod Rosenstein announces indictments of 12 Russian individuals.

On July 13, 2018, Rod Rosenstein, the United States Deputy Attorney General, announced indictments of twelve Russian GRU officers for their efforts in the 2016 Democratic National Committee email leak, through the establishment of false identities as DCLeaks and Guccifer 2.0, as well as charges of money laundering using bitcoin. The indictment also alleged that an unnamed congressional candidate requested and received stolen documents about his/her opponent from Guccifer 2.0, and that the Russians were in contact with a "friendly reporter". Combined with the findings of the intelligence community in January 2017, and endorsed by the Senate Intelligence Committee in July 2018, the indictments appeared to decisively debunk a number of alternate theories by Trump and his allies about who perpetrated the hacks, and came three days before Trump was to meet with Russian president Vladimir Putin for a summit in Helsinki, Finland. After the indictments were announced, White House spokeswoman Lindsay Walters stated "Today's charges include...no allegations that the alleged hacking affected the election result."

Bloomberg News reported that Trump permitted the indictments to be announced prior to the 2018 Russia–United States Summit hoping it would strengthen his position in negotiations with Vladimir Putin.

=== Michael Cohen ===
Former Trump attorney Michael Cohen pleaded guilty on November 29, 2018, to lying to the Senate Intelligence Committee in September 2017 regarding matters relating to the proposed development of a Trump Tower Moscow. In December 2018, he was sentenced to three years in federal prison and ordered to pay a $50,000 fine. He reported to the federal prison near Otisville, New York, on May 6, 2019.

=== Roger Stone ===
On January 25, 2019, Roger Stone was arrested by the FBI and charged with seven counts, including witness tampering and lying to investigators.

His jury trial, in November 2019, resulted in a conviction on all counts on November 15, 2019. He was sentenced to forty months in federal prison in February 2020, as well as a fine and two years of supervised release. His sentence was commuted on July 10, 2020, before he had served any prison time.

== Referrals to other prosecutors ==
=== Michael Cohen ===
Before the charges brought by the Special Counsel were filed, Michael Cohen had pleaded guilty on August 21, 2018, in the United States District Court for the Southern District of New York, to five counts of tax evasion, one count of bank fraud and two counts related to campaign finance law violations. Cohen says he paid Stormy Daniels "at the direction of" Donald Trump for the purpose of "influencing the election". The Cohen investigation was referred to the New York investigators by the Special Counsel's Office.

=== Sam Patten ===
On August 31, 2018, Sam Patten, a Republican lobbyist, pleaded guilty to violating FARA in his unregistered work for a Ukrainian politician and a Ukrainian oligarch — and agreed to cooperate with the government. On April 12, 2019, Patten was sentenced to three years' probation, 500 hours of community service and a $5,000 fine.

=== Greg Craig ===
Gregory Craig, former White House counsel for President Barack Obama, was indicted on April 11, 2019, on two counts of lying to federal investigators — including Special Counsel Robert Mueller's team — in connection with his work, at the law firm Skadden, on behalf of Russia-backed former President of Ukraine Viktor Yanukovych. He was arraigned the next day, and pleaded not guilty in the United States District Court for the District of Columbia.

After a quick trial, Craig was found not guilty on all counts.

=== Maria Butina ===
Russian spy Maria Butina was interviewed by Special Counsel investigators but prosecuted by the National Security Law Unit. In April 2018, Butina told the Senate Intelligence Committee that Konstantin Nikolaev, a Russian billionaire, provided funding for her work with the National Rifle Association. In July 2018, while residing in Washington, D.C., Butina was arrested by the Federal Bureau of Investigation (FBI) and charged with acting as an agent of the Russian Federation "without prior notification to the Attorney General". In December 2018, she pled guilty to felony charges of conspiracy to act as an unregistered foreign agent of the Russian state under 18 U.S.C. §951.

=== George Nader ===
George Nader was interviewed by the Special Counsel in January 2018, and, pursuant to a warrant, his phones were searched; this search revealed images and videos of child pornography.

On June 4, 2019, Nader was arrested in New York City on charges of possession and transportation of child pornography, and bestiality. He remains in federal custody.

=== Stephen Calk ===
Stephen Calk was indicted by a grand jury in the Southern District of New York for financial institution bribery. It was also alleged that he conspired with Paul Manafort. Calk pleaded not guilty.

=== Paul Manafort ===
Immediately after Paul Manafort was sentenced in the District of Columbia, Cyrus Vance Jr. announced that a Manhattan grand jury indicted Manafort in New York County for 16 counts of mortgage fraud, attempted mortgage fraud, criminal conspiracy regarding mortgage fraud, falsifying business records and scheming to defraud investors.[citation needed]

After being transferred from his previous prison in Lorreto Pennsylvania a seemingly disheveled Manafort, pleaded not guilty to all charges. He is currently in the Manhattan detention facility (aka the tombs) awaiting trial.[citation needed]

=== Bijan Kian ===
In December 2018, Bijan Kian was charged in the Eastern District of Virginia with espionage, FARA violations and conspiracy to violate FARA. Kian was accused in trial and in the indictments for working for the Turkish government to gain information and compromise Michael Flynn while on the Trump transition and campaign team, to meet the needs of the Turkish government, including the extradition of Fethullah Gülen, whom the Turkish government blames for the 2016 Turkish coup d'état attempt.

Kian was convicted. The conviction was temporarily thrown out in September 2019 for lack of evidence, but reinstated by the U.S. 4th Circuit Court of Appeals on March 18, 2021.

=== Kamil Ekim Alptekin ===
As part of his investigation of Russian interference in the 2016 United States elections, special prosecutor Robert Mueller assumed control of a Virginia-based grand jury criminal probe into the relationship between Flynn and Alptekin's Inovo BV.

In December 2018, Alptekin was indicted on charges of a conspiracy to violate federal lobbying rules, FARA violations, espionage and making false statements to FBI investigators.

In April 2019, Alptekin was referred to in the Report on the Investigation into Russian Interference in the 2016 Presidential Election, otherwise known as the Mueller Report. The report cited the result of the United States v. Bijan Rafiekian and Kamil Ekim Alptekin as a part of the criminal conduct of Michael Flynn.

=== Elena Khusyaynova ===
Russian accountant Elena Khusyayovna was charged in September 2018 with conspiracy to defraud the United States by interfering in the 2016 and 2018 U.S. elections. She is accused of managing the finances of "Project Lakhta", a $35 million social media operation that used fake Twitter, Facebook and other profiles to spread misinformation and discord. The crimes are alleged to have occurred from 2014 to 2018. Khusyaynova reacted to the indictment with irony about the ability of "a simple Russian woman" to "help the citizens of a superpower to elect their president".

Project Lakhta was conducted by the Internet Research Agency and funded by various Concord Catering affiliates, under the direction of Russian oligarch Yevgeny Prigozhin. All were previously charged with related offenses as part of the Mueller investigation. The case was filed in the District Court for the Eastern District of Virginia by the United States Department of Justice with assistance from the Federal Bureau of Investigation (FBI). The charges were not filed by the Special Counsel's office because the associated activities also related to the 2018 elections, which were out of Mueller's jurisdiction.

=== Natalia Veselnitskaya ===
On January 8, 2019, Russian lawyer Vesilnitskaya was indicted for obstruction of justice. She fled to Russia to escape prosecution.

=== Paul Erickson ===
Paul Erickson, Butina's boyfriend and Republican operative from South Dakota, was charged on February 6, 2019, in relation to laundering money to Butina and wire fraud. On November 18, 2019, he pleaded guilty.

== See also ==
- Mueller report
