= Wagner Group–Russian Ministry of Defence conflict =

2022–23 Russian political and military rivalry

- Part of the Russian invasion of Ukraine
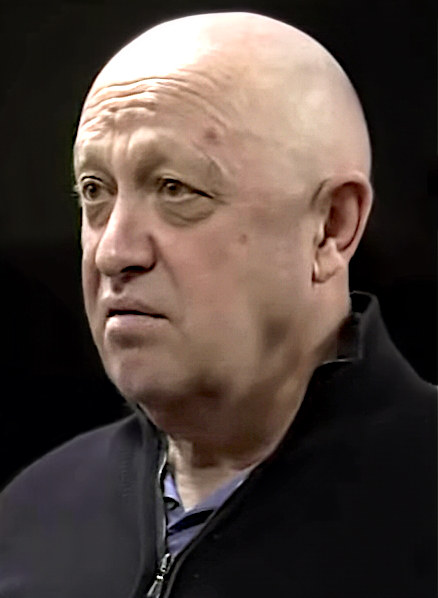
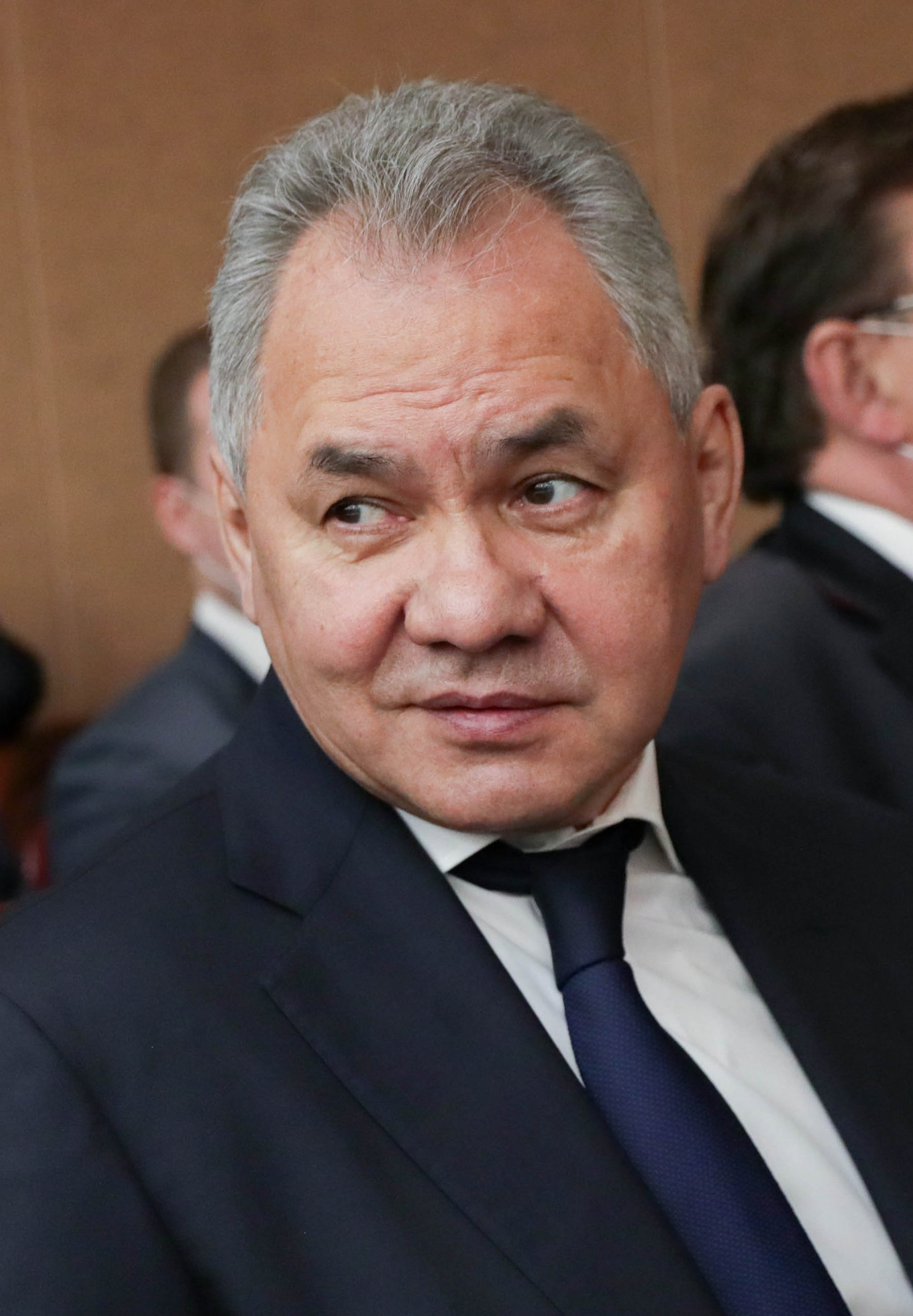
- The main participants in the conflict, Yevgeny Prigozhin (left) and Sergei Shoigu (right)
- Date: 26 December 2022 – 23 August 2023 (7 months and 4 weeks)
- Location: Russia, Russian-occupied Ukraine
- Caused by: Disagreements between Yevgeny Prigozhin and the Ministry of Defence
- Goals: Removal of Defence Minister Sergei Shoigu and Chief of General Staff Valery Gerasimov
- Result: Wagner Group suppressed: Wagner Group rebellion; Assassination (speculated) of key Wagner leaders, including Yevgeny Prigozhin and Dmitry Utkin

Parties
Wagner Group	Ministry of Defence

Lead figures
Yevgeny Prigozhin X Dmitry Utkin X	Sergei Shoigu; Valery Gerasimov

Casualties
- Deaths: 15–31 killed during rebellion. Prigozhin died in a plane crash on 23 August 2023.
- Injuries: Some injured during clashes between Russian Armed Forces and Wagner Group
- Arrested: Many of Prigozhin's sympathizers arrested

The rivalry between Yevgeny Prigozhin, the then-head of the Wagner Group, and Sergei Shoigu, a member of the leadership of the Russian Federation Ministry of Defence (MoD), began in 2022 during the Russian invasion of Ukraine which ultimately led to the Wagner Group rebellion on 23 and 24 June 2023. According to United States officials, there were longstanding disputes between Prigozhin and Shoigu "for years" prior to the invasion of Ukraine. These tensions escalated with further public visibility during this stage of the Russo-Ukrainian War. Following significant casualties of the Russian Ground Forces in the initial stages of the invasion, authorities sought to enlist mercenaries after President Vladimir Putin delayed a mobilization for reservists. Prigozhin and the Wagner Group were allocated significant resources and gained the authority to recruit inmates from Russian prisons in exchange for their freedom.

Despite lacking any official position or legal authority, Prigozhin gained international recognition with the Wagner Group soon being perceived as his own private army. Dissatisfaction arose within the MoD and the General Staff, leading to efforts to curtail Prigozhin's growing influence. In early 2023, Prigozhin announced that Wagner had ceased recruiting prisoners, which the British Defence Ministry interpreted as a governmental ban on such practices. It was expected to diminish Wagner's fighting capacity.

Conversely, Prigozhin portrayed himself as a populist figure confronting the military establishment. At several points throughout the invasion, he criticized the Russian command, and was one of the few who complained to Putin about the military commanders, due to his increased influence. Prigozhin primarily targeted the MoD, denoting its officials as corrupt. However, he also criticized other segments of the Russian elite, criticizing them for enjoying a luxurious life while ordinary people die in the war. He gained particular influence for his statements within the ultranationalist Russian milblogger community, according to the Institute for the Study of War. Tensions between the Wagner Group and MoD reached a critical juncture during the battle of Bakhmut, with increasing isolation afterwards. Prigozhin repeatedly voiced his dissatisfaction with the Kremlin's inadequate ammunition supply, threatening to withdraw his forces unless his demands were fulfilled. He particularly blamed Shoigu and Chief of the General Staff Valery Gerasimov for significant casualties among Wagner fighters.

Following the Russian proclamation of victory in Bakhmut in late May 2023, Wagner began to withdraw, giving way to regular troops. Internal conflicts persisted between Wagner and the military during this transition. Prigozhin claimed repeatedly that the Russian military assaulted his forces. A major surge in popularity came after he publicly accused influential individuals of actively sabotaging his highly profitable catering enterprise in association with the Russian military. This marked a notable shift in his public perception from a non-political to a political persona. In May 2024, Putin replaced Shoigu with Andrey Belousov as defence minister, appointing the former secretary of the Security Council of the Russian Federation.

== Background ==
=== Growing influence of Wagner Group ===
According to Meduza, on the eve of the Russian invasion of Ukraine, Prigozhin developed tense relations with the Russian leadership. According to its sources, Prigozhin was in conflict with both the MoD and the Presidential Administration. Prigozhin criticized Shoigu for the actions of the Russian army in Syria, saying that the Russian military was operating with "outdated methods". In turn, Shoigu did not like the provision of food for the Russian army by Prigozhin's companies.

Between 2022 and 2023 during the invasion, Prigozhin and Wagner experienced a sharp rise in their influence. During 2017 and 2018, Wagner's membership numbers were estimated at several thousand. By January 2023, the number had reached 50,000 according to Western intelligence estimates.

The growth of Wagner's influence was attributed to the failure of the Russian leadership's initial plans to quickly defeat Ukraine. In the first months of the invasion, the Russian army suffered significant losses, but Putin delayed the announcement of mobilization for a significant period. Under such conditions, Russian authorities began to actively recruit mercenaries to participate in the hostilities. Thus, a large number of heterogeneous Russian silovik forces began to take part in the invasion, apart from the main military branches and the Donbas republics' militias: the National Guard, Kadyrovites, the Federal Security Service (FSB) and various private military companies. Internal competition began to emerge between these forces.

According to Prigozhin, the Russian leadership approached him on 16 March 2022 when the Russian invasion of Ukraine "did not go according to plan". On 19 March, his mercenaries arrived from Africa and immediately engaged in the battle of Popasna. During 2022, Wagner received significant resources including its own aviation, heavy artillery and the right to recruit Russian prisoners. Wagner functioned as a Prigozhin's private army, acting outside of Russian law and the military hierarchy of the Russian Federation. The MoD and the Russian General Staff were unhappy with this situation and began to try to limit Prigozhin's growing influence. In turn, he began to publicly criticize the MoD in harsh terms, including calling Russian commanders who allowed Russian forces to retreat in the Kherson and Kharkiv regions "bastards".

On 24 October 2022, the Institute for the Study of War wrote that Prigozhin and his Wagner were gaining strength, creating parallel military structures to the MoD, which posed a future threat to Putin's power. In the fall of 2022, Prigozhin sarcastically said that he was building the "Wagner line" so that, according to him, the Russian armed forces that were hiding behind the backs of Wagner would feel safe.

=== Prigozhin's rise to fame ===
Prigozhin became well known after the Russian invasion of Ukraine. Prior to that, he long denied his ties with the Wagner Group and would sue journalists who claimed otherwise; only in the fall of 2022 did he admit that he was the founder of Wagner. Wagner existed outside of the legal framework of Russia, and back in 2018, the Kremlin Press Secretary Dmitry Peskov said, "De jure we do not have such legal entities as private military companies". Regardless, in the course of the war with Ukraine, Wagner started to become a recognized entity. The Russian state media began to mention Wagner more often; billboards began to appear in Russian cities advertising Prigozhin's military company and members would even come to Russian schools to participate in "Important conversations" classes. By January 2023, a legal entity named "PMC Wagner Centre" of the same name appeared in Saint Petersburg. Prigozhin also gained international recognition and abandoned his previously secluded personal life, frequently reporting news from the line while wearing military fatigues. Prior to that, there was not a single legal entity with Wagner in its name in Russia.

After a video of Yevgeny Nuzhin's execution with a sledgehammer appeared on the Internet in November 2022, Prigozhin made the sledgehammer one of Wagner's symbols. Prigozhin created an image of a military leader who is ready to deal with traitors and refuseniks in the most brutal way. However, according to the Vyorstka Media publication, Prigozhin's reputation among Russian participants in the invasion of Ukraine was ambiguous. Some of the military supported him and even some wrote reports on their transfer to Wagner. For example, one of the officers interviewed by journalists said, "I can say for our guys that almost everyone is for him. The guy is serious. Shoigu is an asshole, it's a fact". According to a Russian mobilizer, support for Prigozhin was due to the incompetence of the commanders of the Russian regular army and the lies of the MoD's top officials. However, part of the military sharply criticized Prigozhin and Wagner, in particular for the practice of extrajudicial executions. Former Wagner employees told reporters on condition of anonymity that their attitude towards Prigozhin was changed by the publication of the video of Nuzhin's execution They became frightened that Wagner had become a "beaten down" organization, and they saw Prigozhin as "crazy", "out of control" and not saving other people's lives.

A source for the iStories publication said:

Prigozhin is a popular theory among the siloviks: He is the sword of Damocles hanging over the elite, and is needed to curb it and maintain an atmosphere of fear. In his opinion, Prigozhin's activity was coordinated with Putin, who, knowing the doubts of the Russian elites about the necessity of war with Ukraine, threatened them with Prigozhin, whose activity is not limited by the law. It has been suggested that Prigozhin's activity was necessary for Putin to "keep defence minister Sergei Shoigu and his subordinates in line".

Another iStories source close to the MoD said that Wagner was fully dependent on the ammunition supply, logistics, medical and other military infrastructure that without which Prigozhin's army would have quickly become ineffective. Although Prigozhin was an irritant to many in the FSB and the MoD, Wagner continued to operate at the instigation of the president. Another journalist source from among former security services suggested that the Kremlin was preparing Prigozhin to fill the political niche of the deceased Liberal Democratic Party of Russia (LDPR) leader Vladimir Zhirinovsky and that Prigozhin could also be assigned the role of "supervisor" of war veterans in Ukraine after their return to Russia, so that combat veterans would not create problems for authorities. According to the iStories interlocutor, none of the "systemic politicians" that existed in Russia were suitable for this role since combat veterans did not recognize such politicians while they all knew Prigozhin. At the same time, Putin needed a personally dedicated politician which Prigozhin seemed to fit the role. Given a hypothetical negative development of events for the Putin regime, according to the interlocutor of journalists, it was Prigozhin who could be assigned the role of "Putin's guardsman" who would be able to carry out a demonstrative beating of the Russian elite: repression and execution. Many political observers also compared Prigozhin and his PMC to the oprichnina of Ivan the Terrible. At the same time, a businessman close to Putin's entourage said that Prigozhin was "more about money than politics", and that according to him, Prigozhin was a member of Putin's inner circle, being personally loyal to the Russian president and "tied to him by blood".

== Conflict ==
=== Tensions enter the public sphere ===
==== First public accusations ====
In December 2022, Wagner first sounded out loud accusations against the MoD. Videos circulating on Telegram alleged that Wagner fighters had appealed to the Gerasimov because of the problems in providing their units with shells, with fighters calling Gerasimov a "faggot" and a "devil". Prigozhin himself said about the statement at the time: "As for the appeal to Gerasimov, I agree that the wording should be more correct. However, the problems that exist should be dealt with jointly". In an interview with the BBC, one of the former Wagner fighters said, "I think it's a conflict between the Defence Ministry and Prigozhin. And it is escalating". The BBC journalists noted that although various public conflicts between Russian siloviks have occurred repeatedly since the start of the invasion of Ukraine, citing an example in the conflict between Alexander Khodakovsky and Kadyrovites, no one had previously publicly called the Chief of the Russian General Staff a "faggot".

In January 2023, Prigozhin and the MoD had a dispute in absentia over whose merit was the capture of Soledar. The head of Wagner claimed that Soledar was captured only by his fighters, while the MoD did not mention the Wagnerites in its reports on the battle of Soledar for a long time. Then Putin's press secretary Dmitry Peskov said the conflict between Prigozhin and the MoD exists only in the information field.

==== Criticism of Sergei Shoigu's family ====
Family members of Shoigu also became an object of mockery by Prigozhin. On 20 February 2023, in his address to the MoD, Prigozhin said, "I am not poking you in the nose with the fact that you sit down to breakfast, lunch and dinner from gold dishes, and send your daughters, granddaughters and dogs on vacation in Dubai. Not embarrassed by anything. At a time when a Russian soldier is dying at the front. I'm just asking – give me ammunition!" In February 2023, Shoigu's son-in-law Alexei Stolyarov liked Yuri Dud's anti-war post on Instagram. After it gained media attention, Stolyarov even got into a skirmish with one of his critics, calling him a "Z-scum", but Stolyarov claimed that he was "not liking anything". Prigozhin stated, "we have to catch Stolyarov and bring him to me. I will train him for six weeks, and since I am a Z-scum myself, I will help him to reform by sending him to combat".

In May 2023, Prigozhin spoke out once more against the Shoigu family:

Shoigu's son-in-law walks around shaking his buttocks, meaning his buttocks, and his daughter opens the Kronstadt forts. Did you earn money for these forts?! You spend your money on these forts? Spend it on fucking ammunition. And when the Minister of Defence shakes his little daughter and shakes some motherfucker who's a blogger, and also bends his fingers that he doesn't like the special operation... We didn't come up with this special operation, but we took a visor and said: 'If we went to fuck with our neighbors, we should fuck all the way'".[1] Criticizing the idle lifestyle of the children of the Russian elite, Prigozhin noted, "and it turns out that men are fighting, while some people just like to have fun. How can Shoigu's son-in-law go to the Arab Emirates and shake his 'booty'? Obviously, it's a bit gay. It's so fucking gay, but that's okay, it's their family's choice"

=== Escalation during the battle of Bakhmut ===
==== Complaints over ammunitions shortages ====
In February 2023, the competition between the MoD and Wagner began to intensify against the background of the Russian winter offensive, with the only success Russian forces managed to achieve being in the direction of Bakhmut, which was accomplished by Wagner forces at the cost of heavy losses. In February 2023, Prigozhin began to complain about the "shell hunger" of Wagner during the heavy fighting for Bakhmut. On 16 February, Wagner fighters published a video, where, in an emphatically polite manner, they addressed the MoD with a request to give them ammunition. Then Prigozhin confirmed that it was his soldiers and reported that the appeal had some effect. Soon a video surfaced on the Internet where soldiers with a Wagner insignia fired machine guns at the portraits of General Gerasimov and the Chief of Staff of the Ground Forces General Alexander Lapin with the words "Fucking awesome machine gun, fucking generals". Prigozhin called this video a "Ukrainian fake". On 20 February, Prigozhin published a new appeal in which he stated that although there is ammunition in military depots, the MoD deliberately does not issue it to Wagner. On 21 February, the ministry said that despite the "exaggerated statements appearing on certain information resources" about a shortage of ammunition, all requests for ammunition are fulfilled for the assault troops in the shortest possible time". On 22 February, Prigozhin published another audio message where he accused Shoigu and Gerasimov personally of not providing ammunition to Wagner detachments. He said, "the Wagner PMC kind of does not exist. We used to be given ammunition formally for some military units, which like to take Bakhmut instead of us". According to Prigozhin, "the Wagner PMC is walking around like a beggar, from the world by a thread, asking unit commanders to help in some way".

Prigozhin then published a photo with the bodies of dead Wagner fighters, saying that because of the lack of ammunition, his squads are suffering heavy losses. He said, "we're just going to die twice as much until everyone runs out. And when all the Wagnerites run out, then most likely Shoigu and Gerasimov will have to take the machine guns. Prigozhin's media companies launched the #DayShellsToWagners media campaign which was active all spring 2023. On 23 April 2023, the General Staff of Ukraine and the Luhansk Regional Military Administration reported that there had been a firefight between soldiers of the Russian army and members of Wagner in the occupied village of Stanytsia Luhanska in Luhansk Oblast. According to them there were deaths on both sides.

Military expert Yuri Fedorov noted that Prigozhin "simply uses" the problem of ammunition shortage for his confrontation with the MoD since other units of the Russian forces also had a shortage of shells, as former commander of the Vostok battalion Alexander Khodakovsky said in particular.

According to political analyst Abbas Gallyamov, Prigozhin tried to show himself as "the main saviour of the Fatherland" which displeased the MoD, while Wagner, according to Gallyamov, was not much more effective than the Russian army—and that, because of his intemperance, Prigozhin began to cause Putin many political problems.

==== Prigozhin intensifies rhetoric ====
At the end of April, Prigozhin began stating that he was ready to withdraw his forces from Bakhmut. In May 2023, he said, "we have been put on an artificial shortage of ammunition that is in storage. We were receiving no more than 30% of our needs. So our losses were much higher than they should have been, but we were getting ahead. A month ago they stopped giving us ammunition, and we're getting no more than 10%".

On 5 May, Prigozhin published a video in which he expressed significant anger while standing in front of bodies of Wagner fighters killed in Bakhmut: "Now listen to me, you fucking bitches, these are somebody's fucking fathers and somebody's sons. And those scum who don't give us ammunition, bitch, will eat their guts in hell. We have an ammunition shortage - 70%! Shoigu! Gerasimov! Where the fuck is the ammunition?! Fucking look at them, bitches!" Prigozhin said to the Russian military commanders: "you sit in expensive clubs, your children enjoy life, you make videos on YouTube. You think that you are the masters of this life, and that you have the right to dispose of their lives". In the same video, he stated that on 10 May he would withdraw his forces from Bakhmut to the rear camps to "lick their wounds", since "in the absence of ammunition they are doomed to senseless death". Prigozhin addressed Gerasimov and Shoigu personally and said, "you will be responsible for tens of thousands of deaths (...) And I will achieve it!"

On 6 May, Prigozhin, in his next address, revealed for the first time publicly that he was banned from recruiting from among inmates, although information about this appeared as early as February 2023. According to the head of Wagner, the Russian military command took such a step "to compensate for their failures, because of envy". According to Prigozhin, the Russian military department also stopped issuing awards to dead fighters of his PMCs and did not allow Wagner to use special communications and transport aircraft.

On 7 May, Prigozhin said that he received a military order which included an order to provide Wagner with everything necessary, and General Sergei Surovikin was to be responsible for interaction with the army and Wagner. However, in his 9 May video message, Prigozhin said that this never happened. Prigozhin accused Gerasimov of allegedly ordering him to give ten percent of the required number of shells. Prigozhin said, "if there is no ammunition, then we will leave the position and ask the question – who is cheating on the motherland after all". In a video published shortly before the start of the Victory Parade in Moscow, he berated the Russian military command and added: "The happy grandpa thinks he's happy. But what is the country to do if suddenly it turns out that grandpa is a complete asshole?" According to Meduza, the Kremlin negatively reacted to Prigozhin's words about "grandpa": "of course, he can then say that this is about Shoigu or about an abstract layman, but people draw understandable conclusions.

Observers have noted the ambiguity of Wagner Group's reputation. Although Prigozhin tried to position Wagner as an effective military structure, this image has been criticized including by Russian pro-war bloggers. They noted that up to 80% of the assault teams of Wagner consisted of former prisoners, and that Wagner created results on the battlefield by conducting "meat assaults", during which Wagner suffered heavy losses. A number of pro-war bloggers noted that despite Prigozhin's public criticism of the MoD, Wagner received ammunition at the expense of other parts of the front, and "shell hunger" was observed in general along the entire battle line, from both the Russian and from the Ukrainian side.

==== Wagner withdrawal announced ====
On 2 June, Prigozhin announced the withdrawal of Wagner forces from Bakhmut. At the same time, Prigozhin accused representatives of the MoD that they had allegedly mined the escape routes of Wagner forces from Bakhmut.

On 3 June, reacting to the 2023 Belgorod Oblast incursions, Prigozhin strongly attacked the military, claiming military leaders were "ceding" Russian land. He threatened to deploy his troops to the oblast without permission or asking for anything except ammunition if the MoD didn't solve the situation, which he said they were in no position to as they "de facto didn't exist".

On 5 June, the Prigozhin press service published a video in which Wagner members interrogated the commander of the Russian 72nd Brigade, Lieutenant Colonel Roman Venevitin. Venevitin, with traces of beatings on his face, said on the video that he "in a state of alcoholic intoxication" due to personal animosity fired at a Wagner car. However, according to the documents published on the Prigozhin channel, the incident with the capture of Venevitin occurred as early as 17 May. According to a lawyer interviewed by BBC journalists: "the capture of a lieutenant colonel of the Russian Armed Forces by Wagnerites is an armed kidnapping of a public servant in the line of duty, committed by an organized group". In addition, Wagner's actions fell under a number of related articles, including Article 318, Part 2 of the Criminal Code "threatening to use violence dangerous to life or health", which could result in up to 10 years in prison.. Journalists also noted that back in late May 2023 a video surfaced where Storm-Z fighters accused Venevitin of giving "criminal orders" and complained about death threats from Venevitin. Venevitin himself published his own video on 8 June, in which he claimed that he had been kidnapped, beaten, and threatened with execution. According to him, Wagner members also behaved this way towards other Russian servicemen.

=== Prigozhin as a populist critic ===
Within a few months, Prigozhin underwent a metamorphosis, beginning to position himself as a "truth teller", ready to speak the unpleasant truth and to criticize the Russian leadership in the harshest terms. On 1 October 2022 during Ukraine's Kharkiv counteroffensive which expelled Russia from most of the region, Prigozhin criticized the Russian command stating that "all these bastards ought to be sent to the front barefoot with just a submachine gun". He also criticized members of the Russian parliament and oligarchy, accusing them of attempting to "steal everything that belongs to the people" during the war. In one of his statements, he compared the elite and ordinary people dying in the war, drawing parallels between this "division in society" and the preceding 1917 Russian Revolution, warning of potential uprisings by "soldiers and their loved ones" against such injustice. The Institute for the Study of War noted that Prigozhin's statements increased his influence within the ultranationalist Russian milblogger community. In addition to his rhetoric against the MoD, Prigozhin also had a conflict with the leadership of the Chechen Republic and personally with its Head, Ramzan Kadyrov. On June 3 2023 however, Prigozhin claimed that he and Kadyrov had solved their differences and implied that a group within the Kremlin had purposefully instigated the conflict between their military formations, adding that the Kremlin commonly plays "dangerous games" that risks destabilizing relations between different ethnic groups inside Russia.

By June 2023, Prigozhin was aiming for the image of the "people's hero of the Special Military Operation". In May 2023, according to Russian opinion polls, Prigozhin's approval rating reached 4%, equaling that of Speaker of the State Duma Vyacheslav Volodin and Communist Party of the Russian Federation (CPRF) leader Gennady Zyuganov. The sociological service Russian Field noted that Prigozhin "is fighting not only on the external front, but also on the internal front, actively earning recognition and a rating. And he converts the former into the latter very well. According to Russian sociologists and political scientists, Prigozhin increased his visibility "through a combination of aggressive marketing and specific achievements". In particular, he tried to "sell" the battle of Bakhmut to the public as his personal merit, and since Bakhmut was the only major capture of the Russian army in many months, the public could not ignore such an achievement".

On 27 May 2023, milblogger and former defence minister of the Donetsk People's Republic, Igor "Strelkov" Girkin accused Prigozhin of conspiring to employ the Wagner Group to orchestrate a coup within Russia. Girkin further claimed that Prigozhin was actively flouting the Russian 2022 war censorship laws by openly pillorying the Russian high command and that his forces were effectively in a state of mutiny. Prigozhin refuted these allegations, asserting that the Wagner Group did not possess a sufficiently large army to execute a coup. By June 2023, Prigozhin had begun making regular statements that were not allowed to any other public figure in Russia. Journalists noted that many of his statements would have resulted in criminal charges against other people. At this time, Prigozhin witnessed a surge in popularity among the Russian populace, particularly amongst nationalists. In a May survey conducted by the Levada Centre, respondents were asked to identify the politicians they trusted the most, and for the first time, Prigozhin emerged as one of the top ten names on the list, marking a notable shift in his public perception from non-political to political persona.

The Dutch political scientist Cas Mudde described Prigozhin's "programme" as a radical populist movement. The general principles of such a movement: a rigid division of society into "good people" and "bad elite", a demand (and promise) to save the nation, and authoritarian methods of implementing these slogans.

=== Wagner Group rebellion ===
On the afternoon of 23 June, Yevgeny Prigozhin released a large interview with harsh accusations against the MoD leadership, in which he stated that the MoD deliberately deceived the Russian public and Putin about the upcoming NATO-backed offensives of the Armed Forces of Ukraine (AFU) in 2022 and about the increase of "Ukrainian military aggression" before Russia launched an invasion of Ukraine on 24 February 2022. Prigozhin said that Ukrainian President Volodymyr Zelenskyy was ready for negotiations with the Kremlin, but the Russian leadership refused due to its "maximalist positions". Prigozhin also accused the oligarchs and the Russian military leadership of launching a full-scale invasion to obtain assets of the occupied Ukrainian territories, higher military ranks, military awards and for "self-promotion".

On 23 June 2023, Prigozhin said that there were missile strikes by the Russian military against Wagner rear camps. In response to Shoigu, Prigozhin said: "This creature will be stopped". The Russian Defence Ministry said that all the messages and videos spread in social networks on behalf of Prigozhin about the Russian military strikes on the positions of Wagner do not correspond to reality and are an "informational provocation". After that, the FSB opened a criminal case against Yevgeny Prigozhin under Article 279 of the Criminal Code, suspecting him of committing an armed insurgency.

After the rebellion led by Prigozhin failed, the Wagner Group began withdrawing its forces from Russia and began moving them to Belarus as part of a deal signed with Belarusian President Alexander Lukashenko that ended the rebellion.

=== 2023 Wagner Group plane crash ===
On 23 August, Prigozhin and nine others including fellow founder Dmitry Utkin were killed in a plane crash as his private were en route from Moscow to Saint Petersburg. Russian state-owned media agency TASS reported that Prigozhin had been on the passenger list of the flight. A Wagner-associated Telegram channel claimed the jet that Prigozhin was in was shot down by Russian air defences over Tver Oblast.

The Institute for the Study of War assessed that the crash, which they described as a targeted assassination, would ultimately eliminate the Wagner Group as a substantial threat to Putin.

== See also ==
- Angry patriots, another loose group of pro-war nationalists who have criticized Putin
- 2022–2023 western Russia attacks, a list of incidents of attacks on Russian soil during the war
  - 2023 Bryansk Oblast raid
  - 2023 Belgorod Oblast incursions
