= Yevgeny Prigozhin =

Russian oligarch and mercenary leader (1961–2023)

- Евгений Пригожин
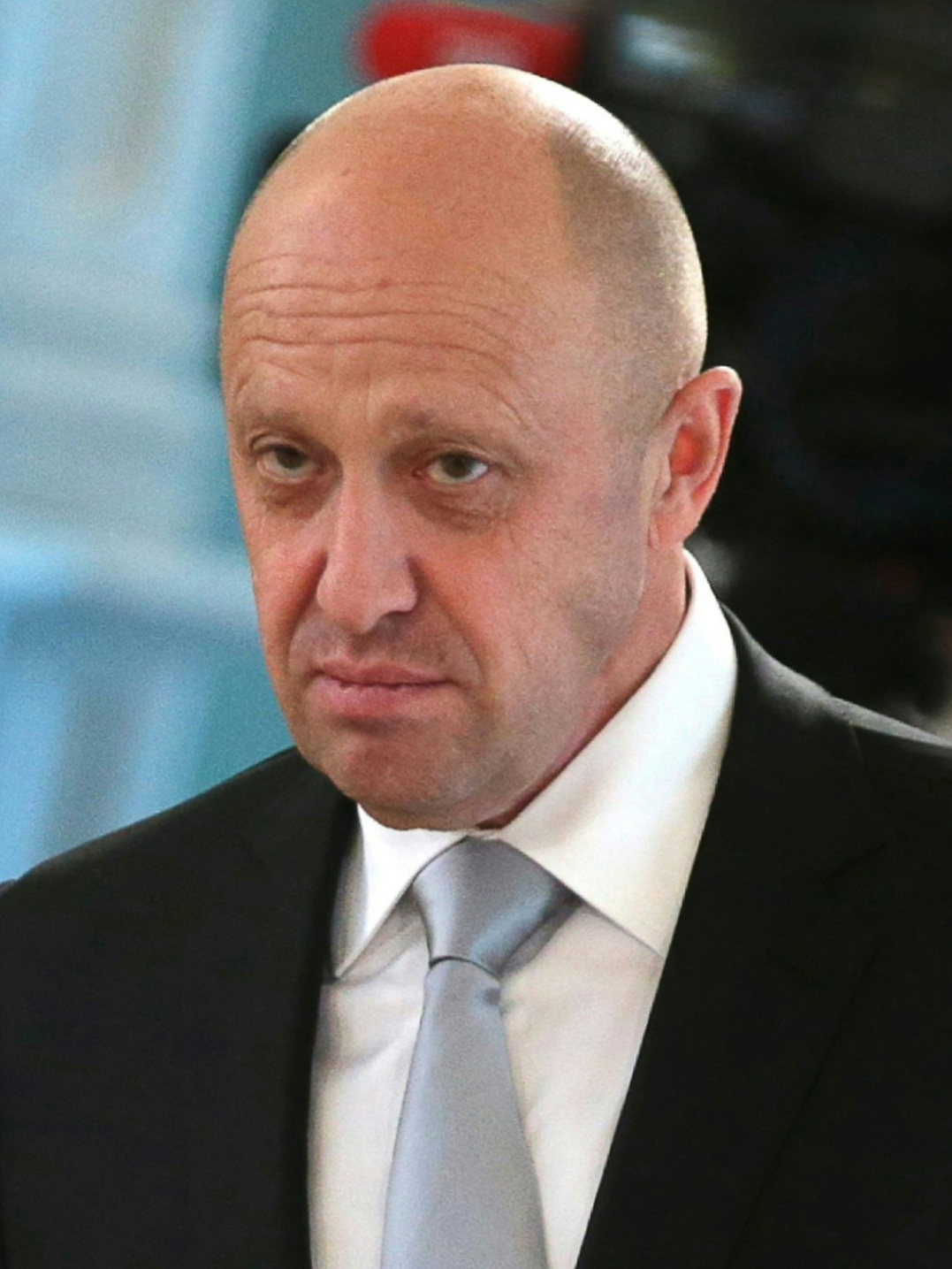
- Prigozhin in 2016

Leader of the Wagner Group
- In office 22 February 2014 – 23 August 2023
- Military commander: Dmitry Utkin
- Preceded by: Position established
- Succeeded by: Pavel Prigozhin

Personal details
- Born: 1 June 1961 Leningrad, Soviet Union
- Died: 23 August 2023 (aged 62) Kuzhenkino, Tver Oblast, Russia
- Cause of death: Airplane crash
- Resting place: Porokhovskoye Cemetery
- Spouse: Lyubov Valentinovna Prigozhina
- Children: 3, including Pavel
- Education: Leningrad Chemical and Pharmaceutical Institute (dropped out)
- Awards: Hero of the Russian Federation; Order of the Republic (Sudan); Order of the Two Niles
- Nickname: Putin's chef

Military service
- Allegiance: Russia
- Commands: Wagner Group
- Battles/wars: Russo-Ukrainian war; Battle of Bakhmut; Battle of Soledar; Wagner Group rebellion
- Organizations: Wagner Group; Internet Research Agency; Concord Management and Consulting
- Criminal information
- Status: Wanted by the FBI for electoral interference
- Criminal charges: 1979: theft; 1981: robbery, fraud, involving minors in crime; 2018: conspiracy to defraud the United States; 2023: incitement to armed rebellion in Russia (dropped)
- Penalty: Suspended sentence (1979); 12 years' imprisonment (served 1981–1990)

Yevgeny Viktorovich Prigozhin (Note: In this name that follows East Slavic naming customs, the patronymic is Viktorovich and the family name is Prigozhin.) (Note: Russian: Евгений Викторович Пригожин, romanized: Yevgeniy Viktorovich Prigozhin, IPA: [jɪvˈɡʲenʲɪj ˈvʲiktərəvʲɪtɕ prʲɪˈɡoʐɨn]) (1 June 1961 – 23 August 2023) was a Russian mercenary leader, rebel commander, and oligarch. He led the Wagner Group, a private military company, and was a close confidant of Russian president Vladimir Putin until he launched a one-day rebellion in June 2023 and died in a plane crash two months later. Prigozhin was sometimes referred to as "Putin's chef" because he owned restaurants and catering businesses that provided services to the Kremlin. Once a convict in the Soviet Union, Prigozhin controlled a network of influential companies whose operations, according to a 2020 investigation, were "tightly integrated with Russia's Defence Ministry and its intelligence arm, the GRU".

In 2014, Prigozhin reportedly founded the Wagner Group, which was used to support Russian separatist forces in Ukraine. Funded by the Russian state, it played a significant role in Russia's invasion of Ukraine and supported Russian interests in Syria and in Africa. In November 2022, Prigozhin acknowledged his companies' interference in United States elections. In February 2023, he confirmed that he was the founder and long-time manager of the Internet Research Agency, a Russian company running online propaganda and disinformation campaigns.

Prigozhin's companies and associates, and formerly Prigozhin himself, are subject to economic sanctions and criminal charges in the United States and the United Kingdom. In October 2020, the European Union (EU) imposed sanctions against Prigozhin for his financing of the Wagner Group's activities in Libya. In April 2022, the EU imposed further sanctions on him for his role in the Russian invasion of Ukraine. The FBI offered a reward of up to $250,000 for information leading to Prigozhin's arrest.

Prigozhin openly criticized the Russian Defense Ministry for corruption and mishandling the war against Ukraine. Eventually, he said the reasons they gave for invading were lies. On 23 June 2023, he launched a rebellion against the Russian military leadership. Wagner forces captured Rostov-on-Don and advanced toward Moscow. The rebellion was called off the following day, and the criminal charges against Prigozhin were dropped after he agreed to relocate his forces to Belarus. On 23 August 2023, exactly two months after the rebellion, Prigozhin was killed along with nine other people when a business jet crashed in Tver Oblast, north of Moscow. The Wall Street Journal cited sources within the US government as saying that the crash was likely caused by a bomb on board or "some other form of sabotage". Since then, researchers and other analysts have reached the conclusion that an on-board bomb or explosive likely downed the plane.

== Early life and education ==
Yevgeny Viktorovich Prigozhin was born an only child on 1 June 1961 in Leningrad, Soviet Union (now Saint Petersburg, Russia). His mother, Violetta Kirovna Prigozhina, was a hospital nurse. His father, Viktor Yevgenyevich Prigozhin, was a mining engineer who died when Yevgeny was nine. His grandfather, Yevgeny Ilyich Prigozhin, was a captain in the Red Army during World War II, who fought in the Battles of Rzhev and received a medal "For Courage". Prigozhin sponsored the 2020 war film Rzhev, based on a 1991 novel by Vyacheslav Kondratyev that mentions his grandfather.

His father and stepfather are believed to be of Jewish descent. Prigozhin's great-uncle was Soviet scientist Yefim Ilyich Prigozhin. He settled with Yefim for several years during his childhood in the Ukrainian city of Zhovti Vody, where he worked in an open-pit uranium mine. His stepfather, Samuil Fridmanovich Zharkoi, was a ski instructor and introduced Prigozhin to cross-country skiing. Aspiring to be a professional skier, he graduated from Leningrad Sports Boarding School No. 62 in 1977. However, he abandoned his sports career after an injury. He later worked as a fitness trainer at a children's sports school.

=== Criminal history and imprisonment ===
In 1979, 18-year-old Prigozhin was caught stealing and was given a suspended sentence of two years and six months in prison. He served his sentence working at a chemical plant in Veliky Novgorod. In 1980, he returned to Leningrad and joined a gang. He participated in a burglary spree in Leningrad, before being caught after choking a woman on the street during a robbery, with him and accomplices then stealing the woman's earrings and boots. In 1981, he was sentenced to twelve years' imprisonment in a high-security penal colony for robbery, theft, fraud, and involving minors in criminal activity.

According to Prigozhin, he violated the terms of his solitary confinement "on a regular basis" until he was sent to general population in 1985, where he started to "read intensively" and worked as a lathe operator, tractor driver, and cabinet maker after receiving training at a vocational school. In 1988, the Supreme Court of the Soviet Union reduced his sentence to ten years on good behavior, noting that he had begun "corrective behavior". He was sent to a medium-security penal colony and was released in 1990. In total, Prigozhin spent nine years in detention. Immediately after his release, he started attending the Leningrad Chemical and Pharmaceutical Institute to get a pharmaceutical degree, but failed to complete his studies. Prigozhin would later flaunt his prison past to convince prisoners to join the Wagner Group.

== Early career and rise to prominence ==
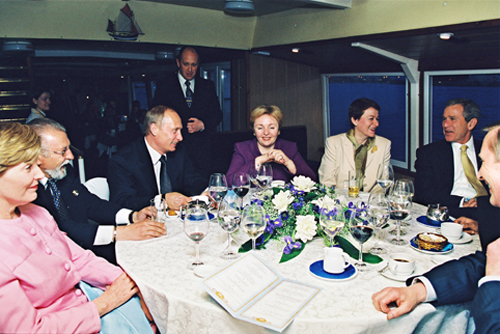
Prigozhin (standing in background) hosted Russian President Putin and US President George W. Bush on his floating restaurant New Island in Saint Petersburg on 25 May 2002.

After his release from prison in 1990, Prigozhin began selling hot dogs alongside his mother and stepfather at the Apraksin Dvor open-air market in Leningrad. Soon, according to a New York Times interview with him, "the rubles were piling up faster than his mother could count them". From 1991 to 1997, Prigozhin was heavily involved in the grocery store business. He became 15% stakeholder and manager of Contrast, which was the first grocery store chain in Saint Petersburg and founded by his former classmate Boris Spektor.

Around the same time, Prigozhin became involved in the gambling business. Spektor and Igor Gorbenko brought Prigozhin on as CEO of Spectrum CJSC (Russian: ЗАО «Спектр»), which founded the first casinos in Saint Petersburg. This trio went on to create many other businesses together throughout the 1990s across various industries, including construction, marketing research, and foreign trade. Novaya Gazeta notes that this may be when Prigozhin met Vladimir Putin for the first time, as Putin had been chairman of the supervisory board for casinos and gambling since 1991. (Note: Beginning in 1991, Putin was Saint Petersburg's chairman of the supervisory board for casinos and gambling (Russian: Председатель наблюдательного совета по казино и азартным играм), and in 1993 began issuing gambling licenses in which shares were gained by the city of Saint Petersburg in the company 'Neva Chance (Russian: Нева-Шанс) which owned the first Saint Petersburg casino AOZT Casino (Russian: АОЗТ «Казино») because it had the same address and phone numbers as city hall, but later it became JV Casino Neva (Russian: СП «Казино Нева») and opened on 19 August 1991. In 1992 or 1993 it changed its name to Laguna, then in 1997 to Admiral Club or more simply known as Admiral. According to the Yakuza Kinichi Kamiyasu who supplied slot machines with cash prizes to St Petersburg casinos in the 1990s from his Stockholm, Sweden, company Dyna Computer Service AB which was a subsidiary of the Masimichi Iida (the brother of Chef Kinichi from Osaka, Iida Misamichi) owned Osaka firm, Dyna Company Ltd., the criminals Gennady Petrov (Russian: Геннадий Петров), Alexander Malyshev (Russian: Александр Малышев), and Sergey Kuzmin (Russian: Сергей Кузьмин) operated the casino through a Vladimir Putin issued license to establish JV Petrodin (Russian: СП «Петродин») in 1991. JV Petrodin, which Kamiyasu owned a 35% stake and Gennady Petrov and Sergey Kuzmin owned a 65% stake through their company BXM (Russian: «БХМ»), used the money from the casinos to provide capital for Bank Rossiya.)

In 1995, Prigozhin entered the restaurant business. When revenues of his other businesses began to fall, Prigozhin persuaded a director at Contrast, Kirill Ziminov, to open a restaurant with him. They opened Prigozhin's first restaurant: Old Customs House (Russian: Старая Таможня) in Saint Petersburg. In 1997, they founded a second restaurant, New Island, a floating restaurant that became one of the most fashionable dining spots in the city. Inspired by waterfront restaurants on the Seine in Paris, Prigozhin and Ziminov created the restaurant by spending US$400,000 to remodel a rusting boat on the Vyatka River. He said his patrons "wanted to see something new in their lives and were tired of just eating cutlets with vodka". Before Prigozhin decided to focus on upscale dining, one of his dining establishments initially featured a striptease show. Prigozhin was reportedly known to punish poor performance or misconduct of employees of his catering businesses with physical violence.

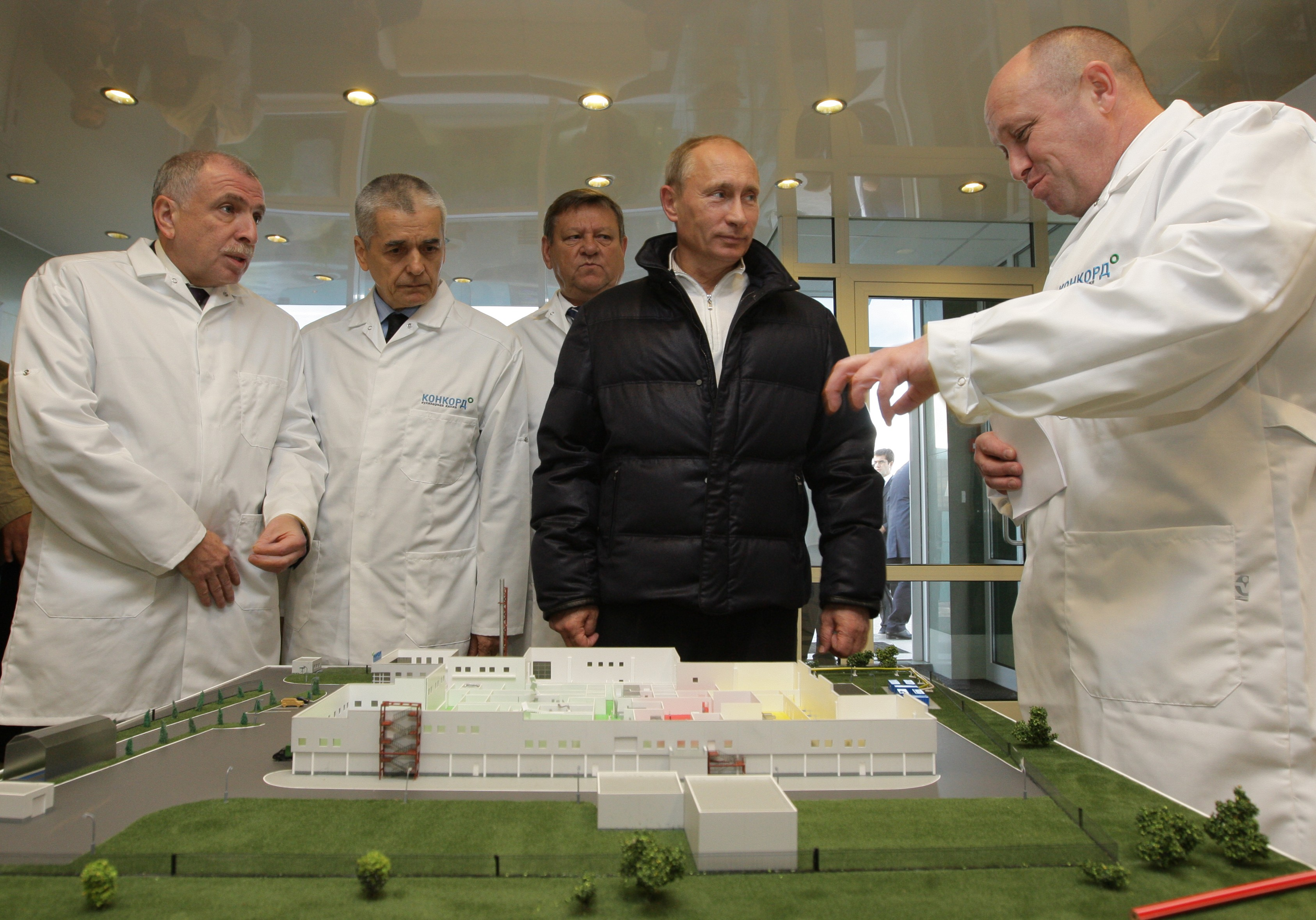
Touring the Concord Catering factory in 2010. Left to right: Presidential envoy to the Northwestern Federal District Ilya Klebanov, Chief Sanitary Inspector Gennady Onishchenko, Leningrad Oblast Governor Valery Serdyukov, Prime Minister Vladimir Putin, Concord factory director Yevgeny Prigozhin

In 2001, Prigozhin personally served food to Vladimir Putin and French president Jacques Chirac when they dined at New Island. He hosted US president George W. Bush in 2002. In 2003, Putin celebrated his birthday at New Island. Over the course of the 2000s, Prigozhin grew closer to Vladimir Putin. By 2003, he left his business partners and established his own independent restaurants. Notably, one of Prigozhin's companies, Concord Catering, began winning numerous government contracts. He received hundreds of millions in government contracts for feeding school children and government workers. In 2012, he received a contract to supply meals to the Russian military worth US$1.2 billion over one year. Some of the profits from this contract are alleged to have been used to start and fund the Internet Research Agency.

In 2012, Prigozhin moved his family into a Saint Petersburg compound with a basketball court and a helicopter pad. By this point he owned a private jet and a 115-foot (35 m) yacht. Prigozhin was later linked to several aircraft, including two Cessna 182s as well as Embraer Legacy 600, British Aerospace 125, and Hawker 800XP jets. The Anti-Corruption Foundation accused Prigozhin of corrupt business practices. In 2017, they estimated his illegal wealth to be worth more than one billion rubles. Alexei Navalny alleged that Prigozhin was linked to a company called Moskovsky Shkolnik (Moscow Schoolboy) that had supplied poor-quality food to Moscow schools, which had caused a 2019 dysentery outbreak. On 11 December 2018, a company claimed to be unaffiliated with Concord Catering called Msk LLC (Russian: ООО "Мск") was paid 2.5 million rubles for an annual "Heroes of the Fatherland Day" banquet held at the Kremlin. However, Msk LLC shared the same contact phone number with Concord. On 11 December 2019, the company received another 4.1 million rubles for another banquet. Prigozhin was declared the 2022 Corrupt Person of the Year by the Organized Crime and Corruption Reporting Project.

== Wagner Group ==
The Wagner Group is a Russian state-funded private military company (PMC) formed in 2014. It initially supported Russian separatist forces in Ukraine during the Donbas War, and later played a significant role in Russia's 2022 invasion of Ukraine. It has also supported regimes friendly with Putin's Russia in the Middle East and in Africa. Prigozhin repeatedly denied links to the Wagner Group, but during the 2022 Russian invasion he travelled to Ukraine to oversee the group's progress and was pictured at the frontline wearing military fatigues alongside Russian Duma member Vitaly Milonov. In September 2022 he said that he had founded Wagner in 2014 to "protect the Russians" when "the genocide of the Russian population of Donbas began". He explained that he played a personal role from the start, claiming that he "found specialists who could help" after "[cleaning] the old weapons and [sorting out] the bulletproof vests" himself. Prigozhin also confirmed allegations, previously denied by the Russian government, that the group had been involved in other countries aligned with Russian overseas interests, saying the Wagner mercenaries who "defended the Syrian people, other people of Arab countries, destitute Africans and Latin Americans, have become the pillars of our motherland".

The Wagner Group was founded to support Russian interests in Africa and other parts of the world, allowing the Russian government to have plausible deniability for military operations abroad. The plan was pushed forward by Valery Gerasimov, who took over as Chief of the General Staff in 2012. Prigozhin was chosen to run the company and he was tasked with operational and logistical aspect due to his pre-existing service relationship with the Defense Ministry (in 2012, he received a contract to supply meals to the Russian military worth US$1.2 billion over one year) and close ties with Russian President Vladimir Putin. Three different sources claim that initially Prigozhin objected to such a high-risk role, although he could not refuse it. Dmitry Utkin, a Russian military veteran, was also named as a founder and commander of Wagner. As Prigozhin had no military background, he reportedly relied on Utkin to oversee Wagner's military operations. Utkin was once head of security for Prigozhin and was also listed as director general of Concord Management.

=== Russo-Ukrainian war ===
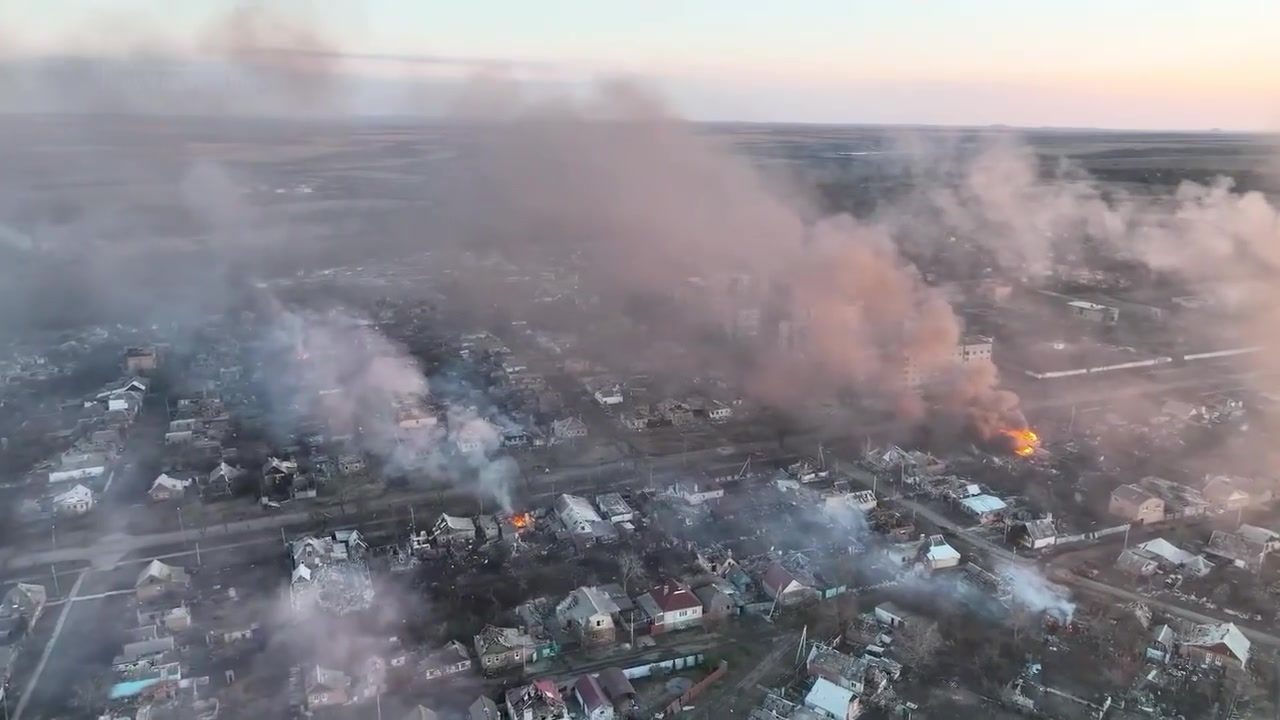
Bakhmut in April 2023. At the end of April, Prigozhin said that his forces were losing around 100 men a day.

Prigozhin rose to prominence after the 2022 Russian invasion of Ukraine. During the invasion, the Russian Ground Forces suffered significant casualties, but the announcement of mobilization for reservists was delayed by Putin. As a result, authorities actively sought to enlist mercenaries for the invasion, which led to a heightened influence and power for Prigozhin and the Wagner Group. Prigozhin was allocated substantial resources, including his own aviation assets. Additionally, starting in the summer of 2022, he gained the authority to recruit inmates from Russian prisons into the Wagner Group in exchange for their freedom. Western intelligence estimated that the number of Wagner mercenaries increased from "several thousand" fighters around 2017–2018 to approximately 50,000 fighters by December 2022, with the majority comprising criminal convicts recruited from prisons.

On 13 November 2022, Wagner Group released a video depicting its mercenaries using a sledgehammer to execute Yevgeny Nuzhin, a deserter who had reportedly been returned to the Russians in a prisoner exchange. Prigozhin commented, "It seems to me that this film should be called: 'a dog dies a dog's death'" and "It was an excellent directional piece of work, watched in one breath. I hope no animals were harmed during filming." On 4 May 2023, Prigozhin cautioned against the use of nuclear weapons in response to the 2023 Kremlin drone attack, saying that "We look like clowns threatening to use nuclear weapons in response to a child's drone".

=== Conflict with Russian Ministry of Defense ===
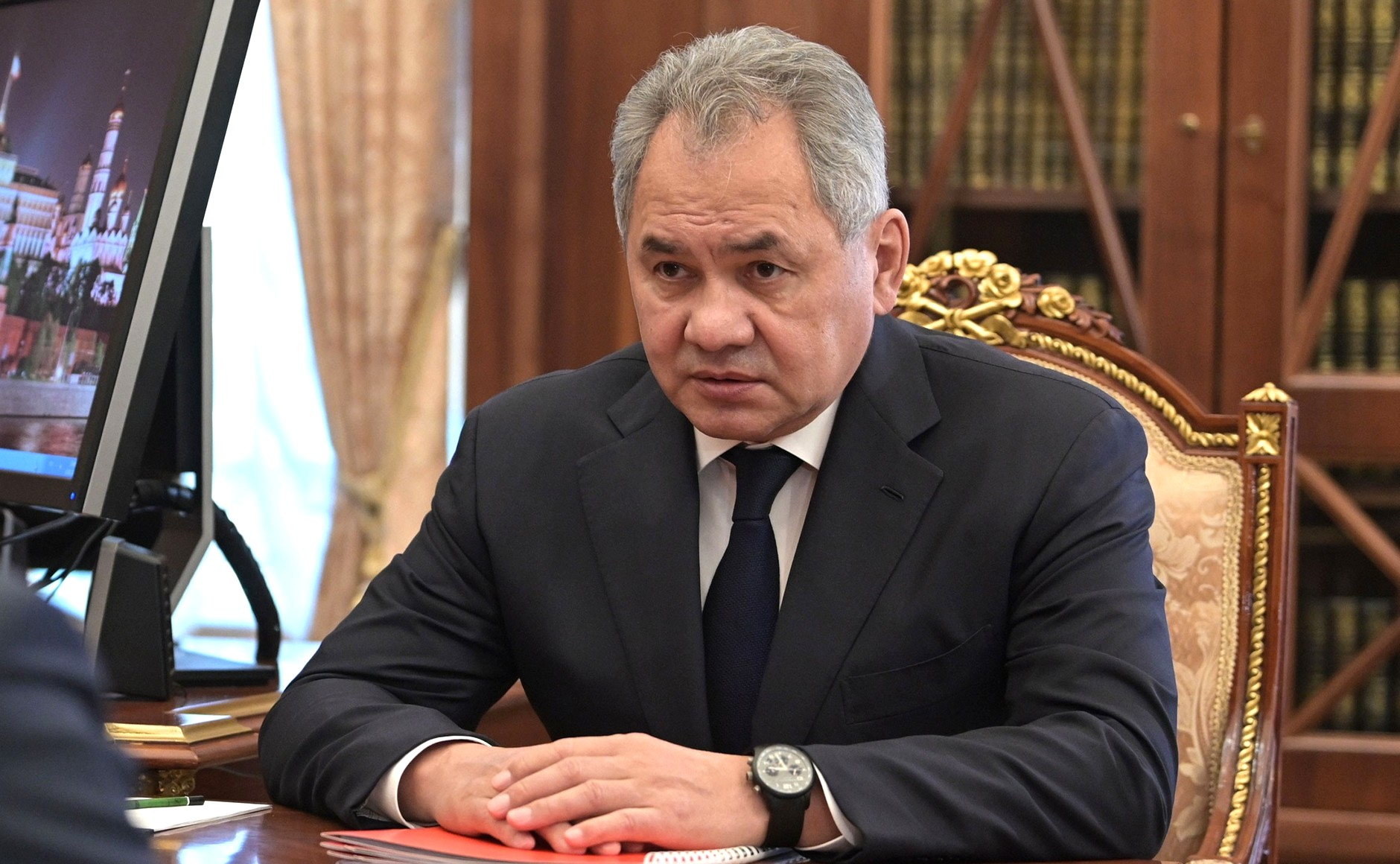
Prigozhin was in a public feud with Russian Defense Minister Sergei Shoigu.

Although the government provided the Wagner Group with increasingly large resources, Wagner had no legal authority. Prigozhin held no official position and was neither appointed nor elected, meaning that he technically had no authority to answer to. Furthermore, Prigozhin gained international recognition and abandoned his previously secluded personal life. He frequently reported news from the frontline while wearing military fatigues. Wagner began to be perceived as Prigozhin's private army, operating beyond the boundaries of Russian legislation and the country's military hierarchy. Dissatisfaction arose within the Ministry of Defense (MoD) and the General Staff, leading to heavy squabbles between Wagner leadership and Russian high command.

On 1 October, during Ukraine's 2022 Kharkiv counteroffensive, which expelled Russia from most of the region, Prigozhin said about the commanders of the Russian army that "All these bastards ought to be sent to the front barefoot with just a submachine gun". He called members of the Putin-controlled Russian parliament "useless" and said that the "deputies should go to the front", adding that "Those people who have been talking from tribunes for years need to start doing something". The Washington Post reported that Prigozhin was one of the few people who dared to tell Putin about the "mistakes" of Russian military commanders in the war in Ukraine. One of the former Wagner fighters, in an interview with the BBC said: "I think it's a conflict between the Defense Ministry and Prigozhin. And it is escalating." Putin's press secretary Dmitry Peskov said that the conflict between Prigozhin and the Russian Ministry of Defense exists only in the information field.

In February 2023, the tensions began to escalate between Prigozhin and Russia's military establishment. This came against the background of the Russian winter offensive, with Russia's only success accomplished by Wagner forces at the cost of heavy losses. In February 2023, Prigozhin began to complain about the "shell hunger" of Wagner during the battle for Bakhmut. On 22 February, in another audio message, Prigozhin said, "The Wagner PMC kind of does not exist. We used to be given ammunition formally for some military units, which like to take Bakhmut instead of us". According to Prigozhin, "the Wagner PMC is walking around like a beggar, from the world by a thread, asking unit commanders to help in some way". Prigozhin then published a photo with the bodies of dead Wagner fighters, saying that, lack of ammunition meant that his squads were suffering heavy losses. He said: "We're just going to die twice as much until everyone runs out. And when all the Wagnerites run out, then most likely Shoigu and Gerasimov will have to take the machine guns". Prigozhin's media companies launched the #DayShellsToWagners media campaign, which was active that spring.

Family members of Russian Defense Minister Sergei Shoigu became an object of mockery by Yevgeny Prigozhin. On 20 February 2023, in his address to the Ministry of Defense, Prigozhin said, "I am not poking you in the nose with the fact that you sit down to breakfast, lunch and dinner from gold dishes, and send your daughters, granddaughters and dogs on vacation in Dubai. Not embarrassed by anything. At a time when a Russian soldier is dying at the front. I'm just asking—give me ammunition!". In May 2023, Prigozhin spoke out again about the Shoigu family: "Shoigu's son-in-law walks around shaking his buttocks, meaning his buttocks, and his daughter opens the Kronstadt forts. Did you earn money for these forts?! You spend your money on these forts? Spend it on fucking ammunition. And when the Minister of Defense shakes his little daughter and shakes some motherfucker who's a blogger, and also bends his fingers that he doesn't like the special operation... We didn't come up with this special operation, but we took a visor and said: "If we went to fuck with our neighbors, we should fuck all the way". Prigozhin condemned the luxurious lifestyle of the children of Russia's top officials and in particular singled out Shoigu's son-in-law Alexey Stolyarov for not joining the Russian army. Prigozhin complained that "the children of the elites smother themselves with creams and show this on Instagram, YouTube and so on, while ordinary people's kids return home torn apart in zinc-lined coffins".

Prigozhin intensified his rhetoric against the Ministry of Defence in April. In May 2023, he said: "We have been put on an artificial shortage of ammunition that is in storage. We were receiving no more than 30% of our needs. So our losses were much higher than they should have been, but we were getting ahead. A month ago they stopped giving us ammunition, and we're getting no more than 10%". On 5 May 2023, Prigozhin announced that, due to a lack of ammunition, his fighters would leave Bakhmut on 10 May 2023 and hand over their positions to units of the Russian Defense Ministry if they did not receive more ammunition. Prigozhin published a video in which he shouted with a face distorted with anger against the bodies of the murdered Wagnerites: "Now listen to me, bitches, these are somebody's fathers and somebody's sons. And those scum who don't give ammunition, bitch, will eat their guts in hell. We have a shortage of ammunition - 70%! Shoigu! Gerasimov! Where the fuck is the ammunition?! Look at them, bitches"! Prigozhin said to the Russian military commanders: "You sit in expensive clubs, your children enjoy life, you make videos on YouTube. You think that you are the masters of this life, and that you have the right to dispose of their lives".

On 6 May, Prigozhin, in his next address, revealed for the first time publicly that he was banned from recruiting mercenaries among inmates, although information about this appeared as early as February 2023. According to the head of Wagner, the Russian military command took such a step "to compensate for their failures, because of envy". According to Prigozhin, the Russian military department also stopped issuing awards to dead fighters of his PMCs, and did not allow Wagner to use special communications and transport aircraft. Prigozhin accused the head of the Russian General Staff Valery Gerasimov of allegedly ordering him to give 10% of the required number of shells. Prigozhin said: "If there is no ammunition, then we will leave the position and ask the question—who is cheating on the motherland after all?". In a video published shortly before the start of the Victory Parade in Moscow, he berated the Russian military command and added: "The happy grandpa thinks he's happy. But what is the country to do if suddenly it turns out that grandpa is a complete asshole?". According to Meduza, the Kremlin negatively reacted to Prigozhin's words about "grandpa". "Of course, he can then say that this is about Shoigu or about an abstract layman, but people draw understandable conclusions". Since the 2022 Russo-Ukrainian war, "Grandpa in his bunker" has become an insulting nickname for Vladimir Putin, implying incompetence and irrationality.

On 9 May, Prigozhin accused the regular Russian army forces of "[running] away" from their positions, while his own Wagner forces were allegedly forbidden from retreating. According to him, any Wagner "withdrawal from the positions would be considered high treason." He also accused the Ministry of Defense of only giving his troops 10% of what was promised, causing high Wagner casualties, and threatened that if he did not receive ammunition, his forces would withdraw from their positions. He said that the Ministry of Defense was more focused on internal power struggles and "intrigues" than actually fighting. The Ukrainians themselves later supported this account, with their 3rd Separate Assault Brigade stating on Telegram that the 72nd Separate Motorized Rifle Brigade had "escaped" from the city and the remaining troops had suffered very high casualties.

=== Prigozhin as a populist critic ===
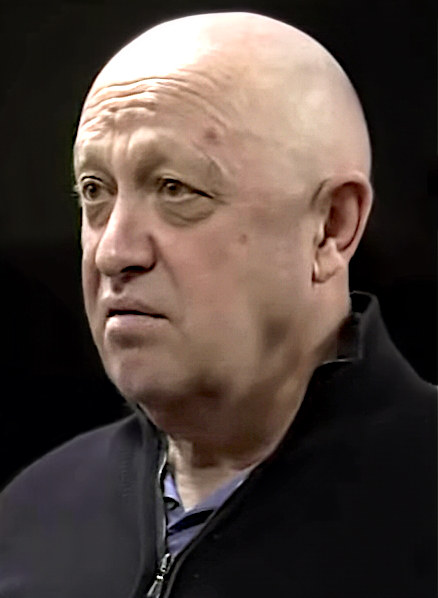
Prigozhin in Ulyanovsk, June 2023

Within a few months, Prigozhin underwent a metamorphosis, beginning to position himself as a "truth teller", ready to speak the unpleasant truth and to criticize the Russian leadership in the harshest terms. In addition to his rhetoric against the Ministry of Defense, Prigozhin also had a conflict with the leadership of the Chechen Republic, and personally with its Head, Ramzan Kadyrov.

By June 2023, Prigozhin was aiming for the image of the "people's hero of the Special Military Operation". In May 2023, according to Russian opinion polls, the sociological service Russian Field noted that Prigozhin "is fighting not only on the external front, but also on the internal front, actively earning recognition and a rating. And he converts the former into the latter very well". According to Russian sociologists and political scientists, Prigozhin increased his visibility "through a combination of aggressive marketing and specific achievements," in particular the capture of Bakhmut, and since Bakhmut was the only major capture of the Russian army in many months, "the public could not ignore such an achievement".

By June 2023, Prigozhin had begun making regular statements that were not allowed for any other public figure in Russia. Journalists noted that many of his statements would have resulted in criminal charges against other people. This period witnessed a surge in his popularity among the Russian populace, particularly among nationalists. In a May survey conducted by the Levada Center, respondents were asked to identify the politicians they trusted the most, and for the first time, Prigozhin emerged as one of the top ten names on the list, marking a notable shift in his public perception from non-political to a political figure.

The Dutch political scientist Cas Mudde described Prigozhin's "program" as a radical populist movement. The general principles of such a movement: a rigid division of society into "good people" and "bad elite", a demand (and promise) to save the nation, and authoritarian methods of implementing these slogans. Prigozhin was described as being member of the "war party" within Russia's leadership, a group of hardliners in support of the Russo-Ukrainian war, but critical of what they see as ineffective or incompetent prosecution of the war by the Russian government.

=== June 2023 rebellion ===
In mid-June 2023, the Ministry of Defence ordered Wagner to sign contracts with the military before 1 July. This move would've effectively integrated Wagner as a subordinate unit within the regular command structure, thereby diminishing the influence of Prigozhin. However, Prigozhin declined to sign the agreement, alleging incompetence on the part of Shoigu. Reports from the independent Russian news outlet Meduza indicated that this development would undermine Prigozhin's hold over Wagner and jeopardize the group's profitable operations in Africa. Prigozhin unsuccessfully attempted to circumvent the order for Wagner's subordination while intensifying his criticism of the Ministry of Defence.

On 23 June 2023, Prigozhin claimed that regular Russian armed forces had launched missile strikes against Wagner forces, killing a "huge" number. He called for a response, stating: "The council of commanders of PMC Wagner has made a decision—the evil that the military leadership of the country brings must be stopped". Prigozhin declared the start of an armed conflict against the Ministry of Defence in a message posted on his press service's Telegram channel. He called upon individuals interested in joining the conflict against the Ministry, portraying the rebellion as a response to the alleged strike on his men.

In a video released on 23 June 2023, Prigozhin claimed that the government's justifications for invading Ukraine were based on falsehoods, and that the invasion was designed to further the interests of the Ministry of Defence and Russian oligarchs. He accused the Ministry of Defence of attempting to deceive the public and President Vladimir Putin by portraying Ukraine as an aggressive and hostile adversary which, in collaboration with NATO, was plotting an attack on Russian interests. Specifically, he denied that any Ukrainian escalation took place prior to 24 February 2022, which was one of the central points of Russian justification for the war. Prigozhin alleged that Shoigu and the "oligarchic clan" had personal motives for initiating the war. Furthermore, he asserted that the Russian military command intentionally concealed the true number of soldiers killed in Ukraine, with casualties reaching up to 1,000 on certain days.

During the early morning of 24 June, Wagner forces crossed into Russia's Rostov Oblast from Luhansk, encountering no apparent opposition. In response, criminal charges were filed against Prigozhin by the Federal Security Service (FSB) for inciting an armed rebellion. PMC Wagner proceeded to capture the Russian city of Rostov-on-Don, and began an advance on Moscow. During the scuffle, Wagner shot down an Ilyushin Il-22M airborne command post plane and several military helicopters. A few moments later, Russian President Vladimir Putin addressed the nation, denouncing Wagner's actions as "treason" and vowing to take "harsh steps" to suppress the rebellion. He stated the situation threatened the existence of Russia itself. Furthermore, Putin made an appeal to the Wagner forces who "by deceit or threats" had been "dragged" into participating in the rebellion.

In response, Prigozhin said that Russia's president is "mistaken", and Wagner fighters are "patriots, not traitors, we have been fighting for our country and continue to fight". Prigozhin said the situation on the Ukrainian frontline was not affected. He also stated that his main goal was to remove Shoigu and Gerasimov from office and reiterated his accusations of corruption against the Ministry of Defence. Despite declaring that the justifications used to launch war against Ukraine were based on falsehoods, Prigozhin still continued to support the war efforts, although calling for waging war more effectively.

Prigozhin allegedly made personal efforts to establish contact with the presidential administration on the afternoon of 24 June 2023, including reaching out to Putin himself, who refused to speak with him. Final negotiations were reportedly conducted by Anton Vaino, the chief of staff, Nikolai Patrushev, the secretary of the Security Council, and Boris Gryzlov, the Russian ambassador to Belarus. Belarusian president Alexander Lukashenko reportedly spoke with Prigozhin upon Putin's request, acting as a mediator to broker a settlement. Charges were dropped and Wagner ceased its march on Moscow. As part of the agreement, Prigozhin moved to Belarus and Wagner troops were slated to return to Ukraine, but those plans were cancelled in the wake of Wagner's refusal to sign military contracts. Despite his charges being dropped, Prigozhin remained under investigation for treason.

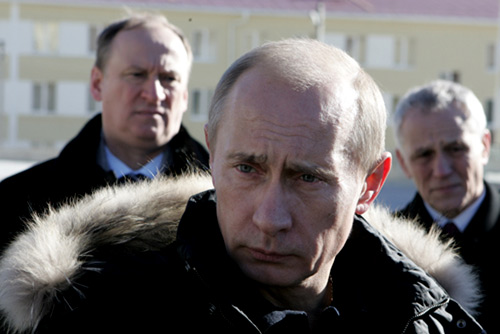
Putin's right-hand man Nikolai Patrushev (left) is believed to have orchestrated the assassination of Prigozhin in August 2023.

The BBC tracked Prigozhin's private jet flying from Belarus to Russia in late June 2023. The jet made several flights between Saint Petersburg and Moscow, but whether Prigozhin was on board was unknown. On 6 July, Lukashenko stated: "As for Prigozhin, he's in St Petersburg. He is not on the territory of Belarus." In July 2023, Prigozhin told his fighters to prepare for "a new journey to Africa". On 28 July 2023, a confirmed sighting of Prigozhin in the aftermath of the failed mutiny emerged, showing him meeting with Freddy Mapouka, a presidential advisor in the Central African Republic, and the head of the Cameroonian pro-Russian media outlet Afrique Média, at the Trezzini Palace hotel in Saint Petersburg during the 2023 Russia–Africa Summit. Prigozhin told Afrique Média that Wagner Group was ready to increase its presence in Africa.

== Africa interests ==
Throughout 2018, Prigozhin established numerous interests in Africa via the Wagner Group and approximately 100–200 political consultants. He became involved in such countries as Madagascar, the Central Africa Republic (CAR), the Democratic Republic of the Congo, Angola, Senegal, Rwanda, Sudan, Libya, Guinea, Guinea-Bissau, Zambia, Zimbabwe, Kenya, Cameroon, Côte d'Ivoire, Mozambique, Niger, Nigeria, Chad, South Sudan, and South Africa. Pyotr Bychkov (Russian: Петр Александрович Бычков) is allegedly responsible for coordinating Prigozhin's "Africa expansion". (Note: In March 2014, political consultants in Russia formed the Russian Association of Political Contants RAPK (Russian: Российская Ассоциация Политических Консультантов РАПК) which is the first professional association of independent experts in political technology and consulting. It was formed to counter political election fraud and disinformation which occurred during Maidan.) According to a 20 April 2018 Kommersant article, Yaroslav Ignatovsky (Russian: Ярослав Ринатович Игнатовский; born 1983, Leningrad) heads Politgen (Russian: "Политген") and is a political strategist that has coordinated the trolls' efforts for Prigozhin in Africa.

In March 2020, it was revealed that Prigozhin had financially assisted Saif al-Islam Gaddafi, son of the late overthrown Libyan leader Muammar Gaddafi, in his bid for the next Libyan presidential election. Prigozhin expressed his support for the 2023 Nigerien coup d'état, writing on Telegram "What happened in Niger is nothing other than the struggle of the people of Niger with their colonizers ... who are trying to foist their rules of life on them and their conditions and keep them in the state that Africa was in hundreds of years ago ... It effectively means winning independence. The rest will depend on the people of Niger, on how efficient they could govern." Since early 2018, the Prigozhin-associated company Lobaye Invest has mined diamonds, gold, (Note: Purportedly at the Ndassima field in eastern CAR, too.) and other minerals in the prefecture of Lobaye of the Central African Republic. (Note: Lobaye Invest has several areas for development during a period of three years: Java (385 km^{2}) for gold and possibly diamonds by decree on 2 June 2018 located about 100 km west of Bangui and is not under government control, Pama (3,712 km^{2}) for diamonds, gold, and other elements by resolution on 25 July 2018 located about 12 km west of Bangui and is under the control of Russian contractors, a site (1 km^{2}) for development by decree on 11 March 2019 located at Boda, and four sites (1 km^{2} each) for diamonds and gold by decree 4 April 2018 published March 2019 located in the cities and districts of Bangasu, Ouadda, Bria and Sam Wanja.) Lobaye Invest is a subsidiary of M-Finance which was founded by Prigozhin.

== Internet Research Agency ==
Yevgeny Viktorovich Prigozhin on the Internet Research Agency, United States indictment

Prigozhin financed and directed a network of companies including a company called the Internet Research Agency Ltd. (Russian: ООО «Агентство интернет-исследований»), Concord Management and Consulting Company and one other related company. The three companies are accused of Internet trolling and attempting to influence the 2016 United States presidential election and other activity to influence political events outside Russia. Russian journalist Andrey Soshnikov reported that Alexey Soskovets, who had participated in Russian youth political community, was directly connected to the offices of Internet Research in Olgino. His company, North-Western Service Agency, won 17 or 18 (according to different sources) contracts for organizing celebrations, forums and sport competitions for authorities of Saint Petersburg. The agency was the only participant in half of those bids. In the summer of 2013, the agency won a tender for providing freight services for participants of a Seliger camp. In February 2023, Prigozhin stated that he founded the IRA: "I've never just been the financier of the Internet Research Agency. I invented it, I created it, I managed it for a long time." The admission came months after Prigozhin had admitted to Russian interference in US elections.

=== Spin-offs ===
Campaigns against opposition in 2013 involved Dmitry Bykov and the then head of RIA Novosti, Svetlana Mironyuk, while a homepage claiming to fight fake news (Gazeta O Gazetah) was used to spread fake news.

== International sanctions ==
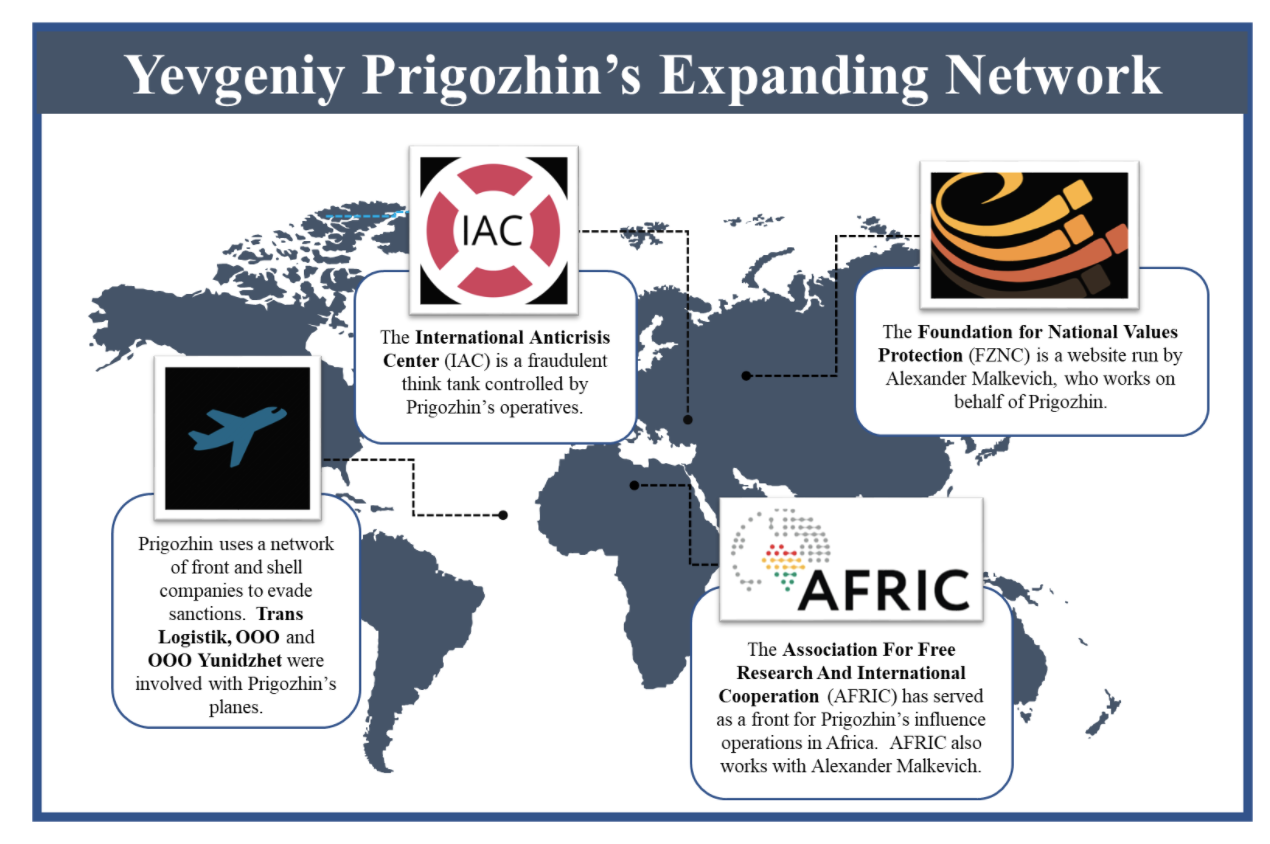
"Yevgeny Prigozhin's expanding network" per US Treasury Department (2021)

In December 2016, the US Treasury Department designated Prigozhin pursuant to E.O.13661 for sanctions for providing support to senior officials of the Russian Federation. In June 2017, US sanctions were imposed on one of Prigozhin's companies, Concord Management and Consulting, in connection with the war in Eastern Ukraine. In January 2018, the US Treasury Department also designated Evro Polis Ltd for sanctions. Evro Polis is a Russian company that has contracted with the Government of Syria to protect Syrian oil fields in exchange for a 25 percent share in oil and gas production from the fields. The company was designated for being owned or controlled by Prigozhin. The sanctions require that any property or interests in property of the designated persons in the possession or control of US persons or within the United States must be blocked. Additionally, transactions by US persons involving these persons (including companies) are generally prohibited.

In September 2019, three more Prigozhin companies (Autolex Transport, Beratex Group and Linburg Industries) were sanctioned in connection with the Russian interference in the 2016 United States election. (Note: As of 15 August 2019, the director of LinBurg Industries is a Latvian Ivo Jutis (Russian: Иво Жутис) Two of Prigozhin planes are a Raytheon Hawker 800XP with tail numbers M-VITO, which is owned since 2012 by a Seychelles shell company Beratex Group Limited, and VP-CSP, which registered with the Cayman Islands Civil Aviation Authority and owned since 2017 by a Seychelles shell company called LinBurg Industries.) In February 2022, the Internet Research Agency was added to the European Union sanctions list for running disinformation campaigns to manipulate public opinion and "actively supporting actions which undermine and threaten the territorial integrity, sovereignty and independence of Ukraine". According to the United States, Prigozhin's activities of interfering in elections and subverting public opinion are extended to Asian and African countries. Prigozhin is also subject to sanctions imposed by Australia, the European Union, Canada, Japan, Switzerland and the United Kingdom. The FBI offered a reward of up to $250,000 for information leading to Prigozhin's arrest. In response to sanctions issued by New Zealand against 51 oligarchs and 24 Kremlin-backed officials (including Prigozhin's own children), Prigozhin went on a racist rant against Māori people in October 2022. He called Foreign Affairs minister Nanaia Mahuta a "petuh" (Russian: петух, a Russian-language derogatory term for a gay man, literally translating as "cock"), referred to her as a man, and said that her moko kauae tattoo made her and Māori women look like "criminals". A spokesperson for Mahuta dismissed the comments as "petty vitriol".

== US criminal charges ==
On 16 February 2018, Prigozhin, the Internet Research Agency, Concord Management, another related company, and other connected Russian individuals were indicted by a US grand jury. Prigozhin was charged with funding and organizing operations for the purpose of interference with the US political and electoral processes, including the 2016 presidential election, and other crimes including identity theft. Charges against Concord Management were dismissed with prejudice on 16 March 2020.

In February 2021, Prigozhin was added to the wanted list of the Federal Bureau of Investigation (FBI). In February 2022, the United States imposed visa restrictions and froze assets of Prigozhin and his family, due to the 2022 Russian invasion of Ukraine. In July 2022, the US State Department offered a reward of up to $10 million for information about Prigozhin, the Internet Research Agency, and other entities involved in 2016 US election interference. On 7 November 2022, Prigozhin said he had interfered in US elections and would continue to interfere in the future.

== Financial support for Maria Butina in 2019 ==
In May 2019, Maria Butina (who had earlier pled guilty to acting in the United States as an unregistered agent of a foreign government; specifically the Russian Federation) appealed for help in paying her lawyer fees. (Note: She had not been receiving any funds for her defence lawyers fees from Igor Levitin through Konstantin Nikolaev.) In February 2019 Valery Butin, Butina's father, told Izvestia that she owed her US attorneys 40 million rubles (US$659,000). Through Prigozhin's Fund for the Protection of National Values, which is managed by Petr Bychkov, 5 million rubles were donated to Butina's defence lawyer costs.

== Personal life ==
Prigozhin was married to Lyubov Valentinovna Prigozhina, a pharmacist and businesswoman. She owns a network of boutique stores known as the Chocolate Museum («Музей шоколада») in Saint Petersburg. In 2012, she started the Crystal Spa & Lounge, a day spa located along Zhukovsky Street in Saint Petersburg, which won a third place award in 2013 for the Perfect Urban Day Spa. She owns a wellness center in the Leningrad Oblast and a boutique hotel called the Crystal Spa & Residence which won the Perfect Spa Project award in 2013. She owns the New Technologies SPA LLC (ООО «Новые технологии СПА») which is located at plot 1, Granichnaya street in Lakhta Park, Sestroretsk, Kurortny District, Saint Petersburg. (Note: This plot was formerly owned by Concord but was granted to Lyubov Prigozhina by the city of Saint Petersburg.) She is also the owner of Agat, part of the Concord group (Russian: Агат).

The couple had two daughters: Polina (Полина), born 1992, and Veronika (Вероника), born 2005, and a son Pavel (Павел), born on 18 June 1998. In 2004, Prigozhin published a children's picture book, with his children listed as co-authors (the book was never put on sale—Prigozhin handed out the book to friends and associates as a gift). Until the invasion of Ukraine, Prigozhin's children were able to move freely across the European Union. On 20 February 2022, Prigozhin's daughter Veronika took part in equestrian competitions in Spain.

Prigozhin's mother, Violetta Prigozhina, is a former doctor and educator, and the current legal owner of Concord Management and Consulting LLC (ООО "Конкорд менеджмент и консалтинг") since 2011, Etalon LLC (ООО "Эталон") since 2010, and Credo LLC (ООО "Кредо") since 2011. All above family members were sanctioned by the European Union, the United States, Ukraine, and many other countries due to Prigozhin's involvement in the Russo-Ukrainian war.

== Death ==
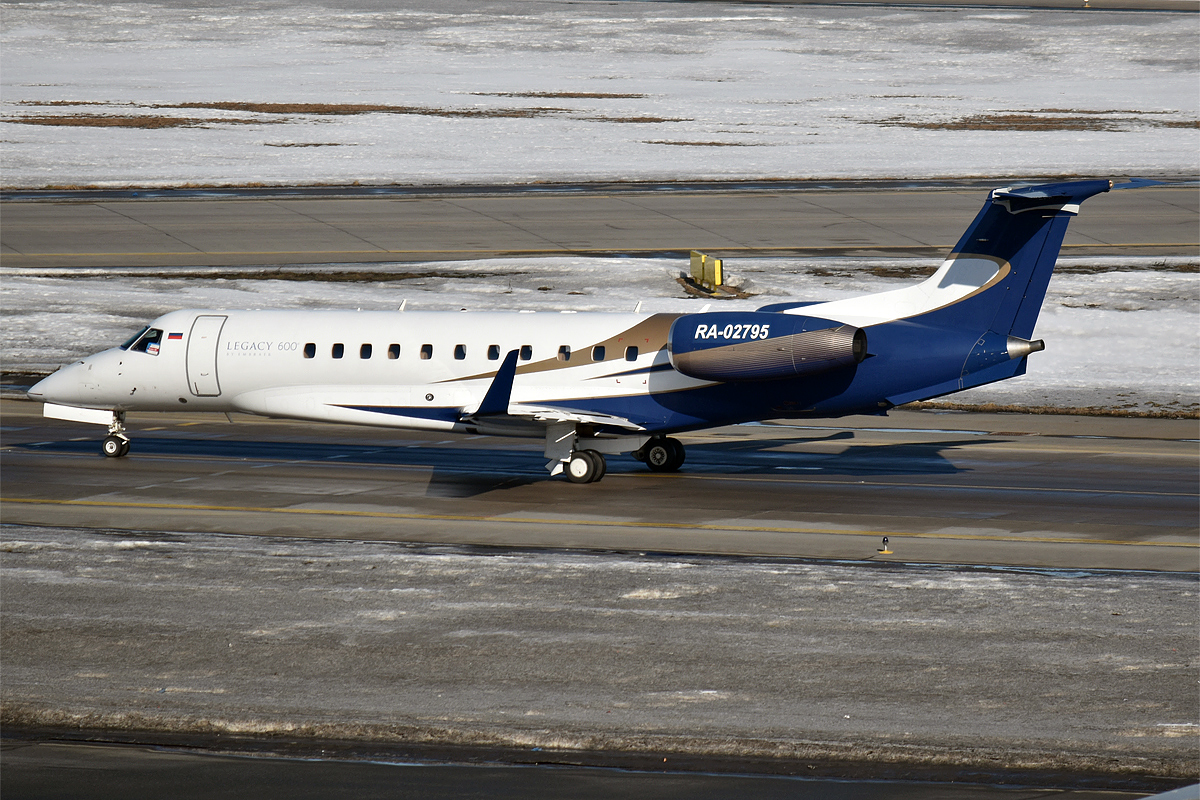
Aircraft involved in the crash in which Prigozhin died

According to Russia's emergency ministry, Prigozhin died in an airplane crash on 23 August 2023. The Embraer Legacy 600 business jet was en route from Moscow to Saint Petersburg when it crashed, killing all 10 people on board. Russian state-owned media agency TASS reported that Prigozhin had been on the passenger list of the flight. The passengers' deaths were officially confirmed by the Investigative Committee of Russia on 27 August, following genetic analysis of the remains recovered from the wreckage.

A Wagner-associated Telegram channel claimed the jet was shot down by Russian air defenses over Tver Oblast. This assertion was contested due to the lack of visible missile trails in the released footage. According to US and other Western officials, "preliminary intelligence reports led them to believe that an explosion on board likely brought down the aircraft in Russia, killing all the passengers aboard."

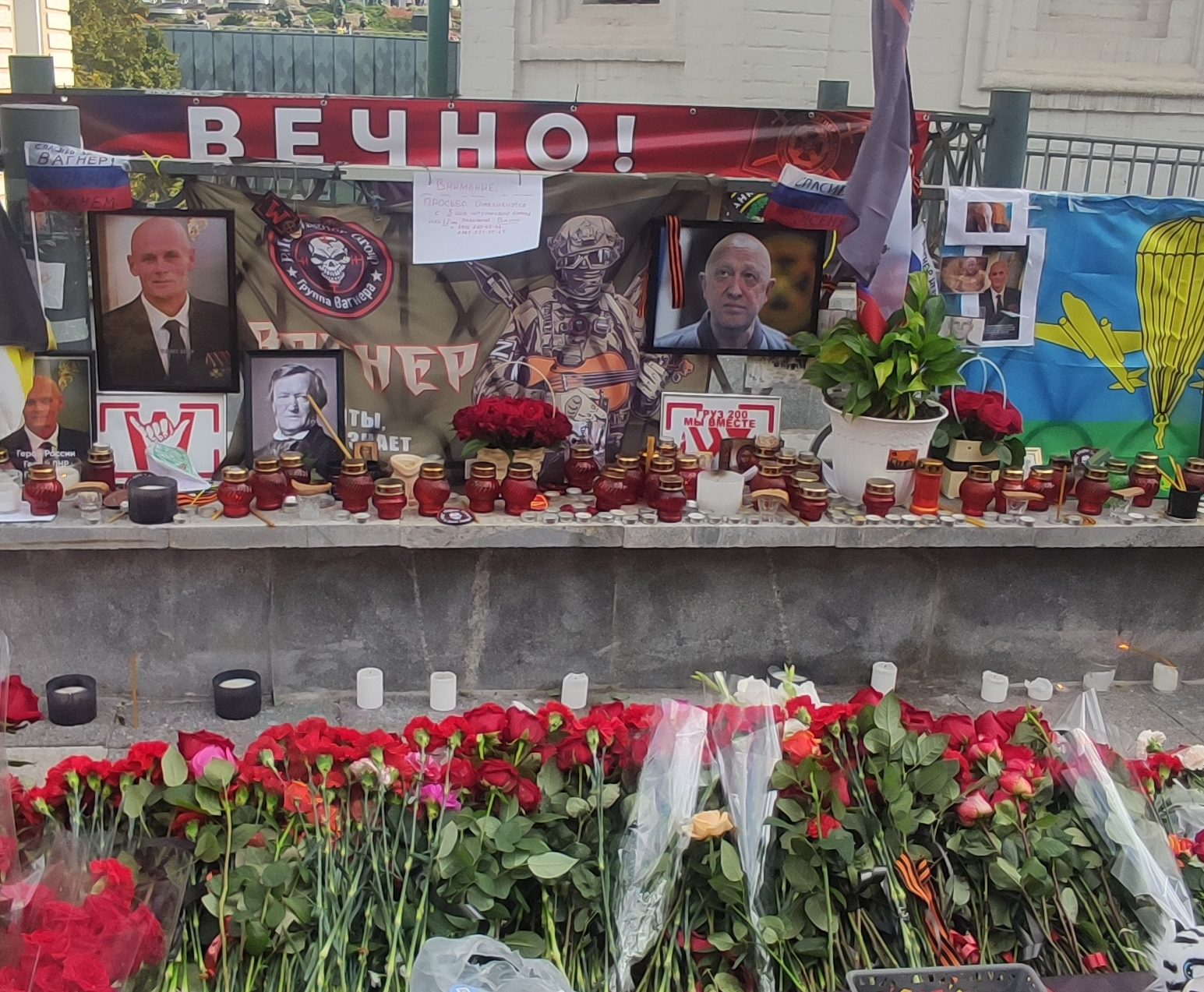
Makeshift memorial to Yevgeny Prigozhin and Dmitry Utkin in Moscow

Makeshift memorials for Prigozhin and Utkin were made in several cities with candles, flowers, and Wagner flags. A video of a Wagner soldier crying in front of a memorial went viral. On 29 August, Prigozhin was buried in a private ceremony at Porokhovskoe Cemetery in Saint Petersburg, beside his father.

On 6 September, Ukrainian Main Directorate of Intelligence reported that it had not been able to confirm with certainty the death of Yevgeny Prigozhin. On 10 September, Ukrainian President Volodymyr Zelenskyy confirmed Prigozhin's death and cited Putin breaking the agreement with Prigozhin as a reason for refusing to enter negotiations with Russia under Putin.

On 22 December 2023, The Wall Street Journal cited sources within the Western and Russian intelligence agencies as saying that the Wagner Group plane crash was orchestrated by Putin's right-hand man Nikolai Patrushev. The paper alleged that Patrushev presented to Putin a plan to assassinate Prigozhin in August 2023, which led to intelligence officials inserting a bomb under the wing of Prigozhin's plane during pre-departure safety checks.

== Awards ==
Prigozhin received a number of Russian awards, particularly the title of Hero of the Russian Federation in 2022. He received Sudan's Order of the Republic in 2018, and was also awarded the Order of the Two Niles in 2020.

== Memorials ==
In April 2024, a monument depicting Prigozhin and Wagner co-founder Dmitry Utkin was unveiled outside the Wagner Group's chapel in Goryachy Klyuch, Krasnodar Krai, which also contains the largest cemetery for Wagner mercenaries. The municipal government said that the monument was built on private property and did not require authorization from their side. In December 2024, a statue of Prigozhin and Utkin was unveiled in the Central African Republic; the statue showed Prigozhin wearing a bulletproof vest and holding a walkie-talkie next to Utkin, who holds an AK-47 rifle.

== See also ==
- List of Heroes of the Russian Federation
- Suspicious Russia-related deaths since 2022
- Timeline of investigations into Donald Trump and Russia (January–June 2018)
- Timeline of Russian interference in the 2016 United States elections
