= National Security Law Unit =

Within the American Federal Bureau of Investigation, the National Security Law Unit forms part of the Office of the General Counsel It was previously led by Michael J. Woods.

== See also ==
- FBI National Security Branch
