= Dmitry Utkin =

Russian military officer (1970–2023)

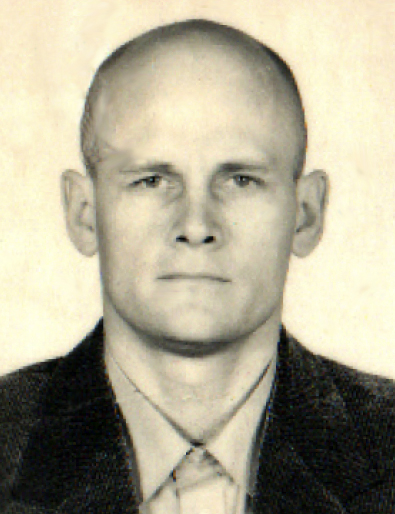
- Utkin's passport photo
- Native name: Дмитрий Валерьевич Уткин
- Born: 11 June 1970; Asbest, Sverdlovsk Oblast, Soviet Union
- Died: 23 August 2023 (aged 53) Kuzhenkino, Tver Oblast, Russia
- Cause of death: Airplane crash
- Allegiance: Russian Armed Forces (1993–2013); Slavonic Corps (2013); Wagner Group (2014–2023)
- Branch: GRU (1993–2013)
- Rank: Lieutenant colonel (1993–2013)
- Commands: 2nd Spetsnaz Brigade (1993–2013); 700th Spetsnaz Detachment Wagner Group (2014–2023)
- Conflicts: Syrian Civil War; Russo-Ukrainian War
- Awards: Order of Courage (4)

Dmitry Valerievich Utkin (Note: In this name that follows East Slavic naming customs, the patronymic is Valerievich and the family name is Utkin.) (Russian: Дмитрий Валерьевич Уткин; 11 June 1970 – 23 August 2023) was a Russian military officer and mercenary. He served as a special forces officer in the GRU, where he held the rank of lieutenant colonel. He was the co-founder and military commander of the Russian state-funded Wagner Group, with his military alias reportedly being Wagner. Utkin was a neo-Nazi. He rarely made public appearances, but was allegedly the commander of the private military company, while Yevgeny Prigozhin was its owner and public face. Utkin was awarded four Orders of Courage of Russia.

Utkin was killed on 23 August 2023 when a plane carrying him, Prigozhin and eight others crashed in Tver Oblast, leaving no survivors.

== Early life and education ==
Dmitry Valerievich Utkin was born on 11 June 1970 in Asbest, a village in Sverdlovsk Oblast, Soviet Union. His mother, a civil engineer, divorced Utkin's father when Utkin was very young.

During his early childhood, Utkin and his mother relocated to the village of Smoline in Kirovohrad Oblast in Soviet Ukraine, where he was raised. He was described by classmates as very studious, but arrogant. He fathered two children in Smoline.

After graduating from high school in Smoline, Utkin moved to Leningrad (now Saint Petersburg) where he entered the S. M. Kirov Higher Combined Arms Command School and later joined the GRU Special Forces.

In the 1990s, he married Elena Shcherbinina, with whom he had three children. They divorced in the early 2000s. In 2015, Shcherbinina reported Utkin as missing on a television program.

== Views ==
According to several news outlets, Utkin was an admirer of Nazi Germany and had multiple Nazi tattoos, including Schutzstaffel (SS) insignia. Utkin also reportedly used call sign Wagner after German composer Richard Wagner, because his work was greatly admired by Adolf Hitler and was appropriated by the Nazis. Allegedly he greeted subordinates by saying "Heil!", wore a Wehrmacht field cap around Wagner training grounds, and sometimes signed his name with the lightning bolt insignia of the SS.

Members of the Wagner Group have said that Utkin was a Rodnover, a believer in the Slavic native faith.

== Military career ==
=== Russia and Slavonic Corps ===
Utkin served as the commander of the 700th Separate Special Detachment of the 2nd Separate Special Brigade of the Russian GRU military intelligence service, stationed in Pechory, Pskov Oblast, until 2013.

After leaving the military, in 2013 Utkin began working for the Moran Security Group, a private company founded by Russian military veterans, which was involved in security and training missions worldwide, and specializes in security against piracy. The same year, senior Moran Security Group managers were involved in setting up the Hong Kong-based Slavonic Corps, which headhunted contractors to "protect oil fields and pipelines" in Syria during its civil war. Utkin was deployed in Syria as a member of the Slavonic Corps, surviving its disastrous mission.

Utkin returned to Moscow in October 2013. Russia's Federal Security Service in November 2013 arrested some members of the Slavonic Corps for illegal mercenary activity.

=== Wagner Group ===
Almost immediately after returning to Russia, Utkin reportedly created his own mercenary group. The group's name, the Wagner Group, is a reference to the call-sign Utkin was using at the time, "Wagner", which is itself a reference to German composer Richard Wagner (see political and racial views). Utkin and the Wagner Group, as well as several veterans of the Slavonic Corps, were seen in Crimea in February 2014 and then in Donbas, where they fought for the pro-Russian separatists during the Russo-Ukrainian War. Gazeta.ru reported that Utkin and his men could have been involved in the killing of several field commanders of the self-proclaimed Luhansk People's Republic. Turkish newspaper Yeni Şafak reported that Utkin was possibly a figurehead for the company, while the real head of Wagner was someone else.

Utkin was seen in the Kremlin during the celebration of Fatherland's Heroes Day on 9 December 2016. He attended the celebration as a laureate of four Orders of Courage, and was photographed with the President of Russia, Vladimir Putin. Dmitry Peskov, the Press Secretary for the Russian President, admitted that Utkin was among the invitees, but did not comment on his connection with the mercenaries. This was reportedly Utkin's last public appearance.

RBK reported that after completing training in Krasnodar Krai, Utkin and his men returned to Syria in 2015. Soon after the start of Russian aerial strikes in Syria, reports emerged of the deaths of Russian mercenaries fighting on the ground. Several images spread in social media apparently depicting armed Russian men killed during the Battle of Palmyra in March 2016. Sky News reported that approximately 500 to 600 people, mostly Wagner mercenaries, were killed in Syria in 2016. In June 2017, Utkin ordered that a Syrian deserter be tortured and bludgeoned to death on camera.

The Wagner Group had an important role in the Russian invasion of Ukraine. By this time, it was reported that Utkin was Wagner's behind-the-scenes military commander, responsible for overseeing its military operations, while Prigozhin was its owner, financier and public face. The group were the backbone of the Russian forces in the Battle of Bakhmut. Prigozhin began openly criticizing the Russian Defense Ministry for mishandling the war against Ukraine. On 23 June 2023, Prigozhin led the Wagner Group in a rebellion after accusing the Defense Ministry of shelling Wagner soldiers. Wagner units seized the Russian city of Rostov-on-Don, while a Wagner convoy headed towards Moscow. Utkin's role in the Wagner mutiny is unknown, though there were reports he was in a tank leading the Wagner convoy towards Moscow. The mutiny was halted the next day when an agreement was reached: Wagner mutineers would not be prosecuted if they chose to either sign contracts with the Defense Ministry or move to Belarus.

== Sanctions ==
In June 2017, the United States imposed sanctions against Utkin as the head of Wagner Group. In November 2017, RBK reported the appointment of Utkin as the CEO of Concord Management and Consulting, the managing company of the restaurant holding owned by Yevgeny Prigozhin, who is believed to have been the financier of Wagner Group. Bellingcat said that this was a different Dmitry Utkin, however.

In December 2021, the Council of the European Union imposed restrictive measures against Utkin and others associated with the Wagner Group. (Note: Council Implementing Regulation (EU) 2021/2195 of 13 December 2021 implementing Regulation (EU) 2020/1998 concerning restrictive measures against serious human rights violations and abuses.) Utkin was accused of being "responsible for serious human rights abuses committed by the group, which include torture and extrajudicial, summary or arbitrary executions and killings."

Utkin was sanctioned by the governments of New Zealand and the United Kingdom in relation to the Russian invasion of Ukraine.

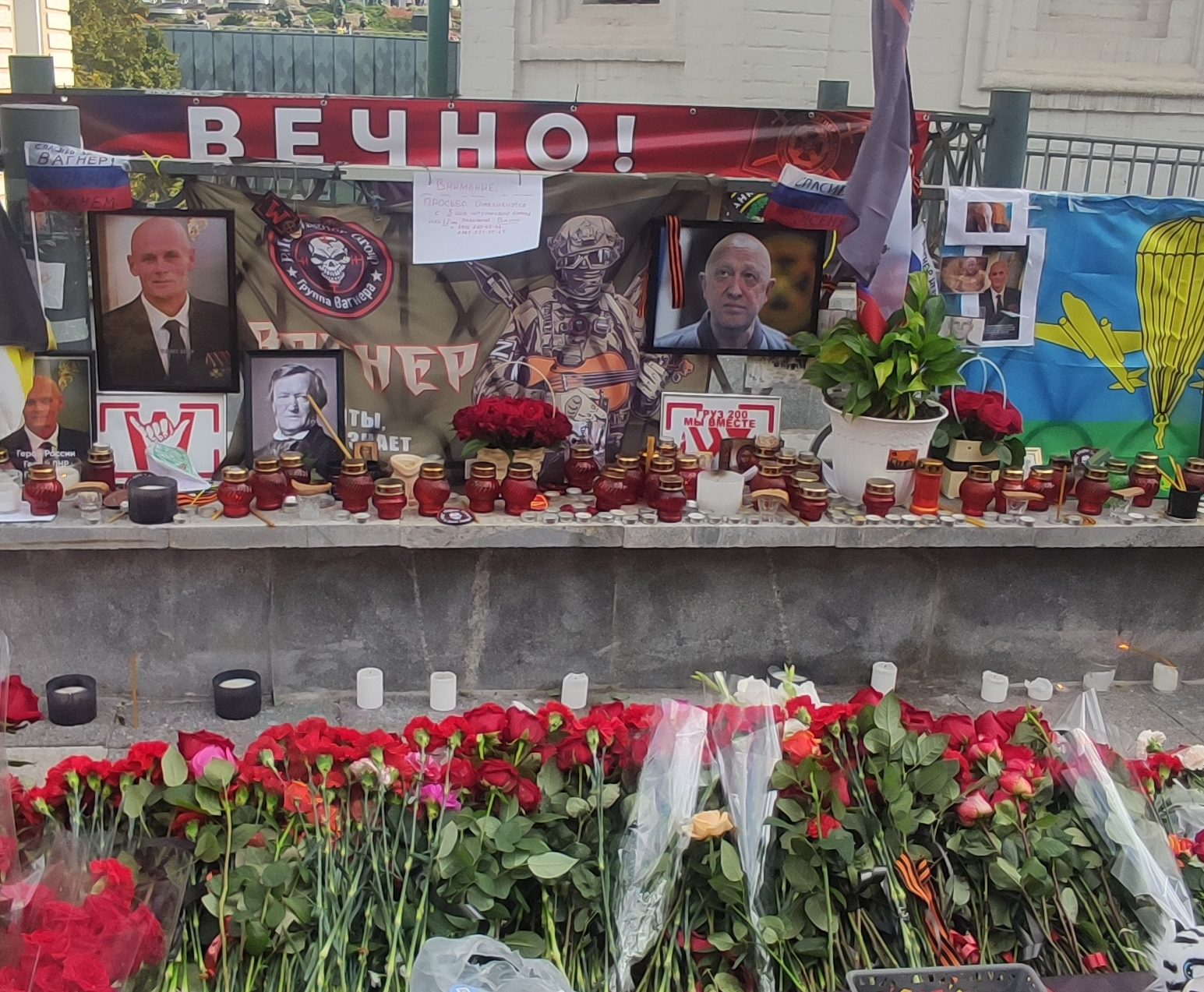
Makeshift memorial to Utkin and Yevgeny Prigozhin in Moscow

== Death ==
Utkin died in a plane crash on 23 August 2023 which also killed nine other people, including Wagner Group leader Yevgeny Prigozhin. Utkin was buried on 31 August at the Federal Military Memorial Cemetery in Moscow Oblast.

== Memorials ==
In April 2024, a monument depicting Utkin and Yevgeny Prigozhin was unveiled outside the Wagner Group's chapel in Goryachy Klyuch, Krasnodar Krai, which also contains the largest cemetery for Wagner mercenaries. The municipal government said that the monument was built on private property and did not require authorization from their side.

In December 2024, a statue of Utkin and Prigozhin were unveiled in the Central African Republic, the statue showed Utkin who holds an AK-47 rifle next to Prigozhin wearing a bullet-proof vest and holding a walkie-talkie.

== See also ==
- Suspicious Russia-related deaths since 2022
