= Concord Management and Consulting =

Russian company

- Native name: Конкорд Менеджмент и Консалтинг
- Type: Private
- Founded: 1995; 31 years ago in St. Petersburg, Russia
- Founder: Yevgeny Prigozhin
- Headquarters: St. Petersburg, Russia
- Key people: Yevgeny Prigozhin (founder); Dmitry Utkin (CEO)
- Owners: Violetta Prigozhina (2011–present); Yevgeny Prigozhin (1995–2009)
- Subsidiaries: Concord Catering; LLC Agat; LLC Megaline

Concord Management and Consulting (Russian: Конкорд Менеджмент и Консалтинг) is a member of the Concord company group, which was half owned by Yevgeny Prigozhin. Based in St. Petersburg, Russia, it owns and operates several restaurants and is also the parent company of Concord Catering.

The company was founded by Yevgeny Prigozhin in 1995. He was the listed owner until 2009. His mother, Violetta Prigozhina, has been the listed owner since 2011.

"North Versailles" (Russian: Северный Версаль) is a luxury housing development in the Lahti-Primorsky district of St. Petersburg built and managed by Concord Management and Consulting. The development closed a section of Novaya Street to the public by erecting gates with armed guards. This was controversial because city records showed the street as still a public right of way.

Concord Management and Consulting owns 50% of LLC Megaline (Russian: Мегалайн). Megaline received most of the capital construction contracts for the Russian military in 2016 in what appears to have been a rigged bidding process. Concord Management and Consulting's lawyers provided a package of amendments to the Ministry of Defense to change the laws in a way that would allow Megaline to bid for the contracts since it otherwise wasn't qualified. The amendments were submitted to the Duma by the government on 11 February 2014, and adopted on 16 April 2014.

On 20 June 2017, the United States Treasury Department added Concord Management and Consulting to the list of companies sanctioned for the Russo-Ukrainian war.

Dmitry Utkin, also under sanctions, became the CEO of Concord Management and Consulting on 14 November 2017. This is not the same Dmitry Utkin who was the co-founder of Wagner Group, a private military contractor. He replaced Anastasia Sautina.

== Indictment ==
Indictment for interfering in the 2016 U.S. elections

A February 2018 indictment by the United States Justice Department alleged that Concord Management and Consulting began operations in 2014 with the intention to financially support a group known as the Internet Research Agency which interfered with the 2016 United States presidential election won by Donald Trump.

An initial hearing was in May 2018. On Friday, 16 November, The Hill reported a U.S. Federal Judge upholding Robert Mueller's indictment.

Hearings continued throughout the year and into 2019.

A trial date was set for April 1, 2020 but as of March 2, 2020 the court is facing delays in the production of documents needed before trial by attorneys for both Concord and the Department of Justice.

The charges against Concord Management and Consulting were dismissed with prejudice on March 16, 2020. Prosecutors complained that Concord did not submit all information required by the court and going to trial could reveal US investigative "tools and techniques". They added that the US government would have been unable to present some evidence to the court because that would compromise classified material. Concord defense lawyer Eric Dubelier suggested that the indictment was political and said the "evidence was completely devoid of any information that could establish that the defendants knew what they were doing was in violation of highly complex US laws and regulations". The Financial Times described the indictment as "a rare mis-step by Mr Mueller", because indicting a corporate entity allowed Concord "to obtain case information, taunt the US in federal court and go to trial with little fear of the repercussions that an individual would face". US prosecutors said the US government would still pursue individual charges against Prigozhin.
