= Timeline of Russian interference in the 2016 United States elections (July 2016 – election day) =

This is a timeline of events related to Russian interference in the 2016 United States elections.

It includes events described in investigations into links between Trump associates and Russian officials following July 2016 through Election Day November 8, 2016. Events and investigations also occurred during the presidential transition from November 9, 2016, to January 20, 2017, and continued through the first and second halves of 2017, the first and second halves of 2018, the first and second halves of 2019, and 2020 onwards; largely as parts of the Crossfire Hurricane FBI investigation, the Special Counsel investigation, multiple ongoing criminal investigations by several State Attorneys General, and the investigation resulting in the Inspector General report on FBI and DOJ actions in the 2016 election.

Related information is sorted by some topic threads in another timeline.

== July 2016 – November 8, 2016 ==
=== July 2016 ===
- Summer:
  - IRA employees use the stolen identities of four Americans to open PayPal and bank accounts to act as conduits for funding their activities in the United States.
  - The FBI applies for a FISA warrant to monitor communications of four Trump campaign officials. The FISA Court rejects the application, asking the FBI to narrow its scope. A warrant on Carter Page alone is granted in October 2016.
  - Lawyer and Trump campaign foreign policy advisor Joseph E. Schmitz receives a cache of emails from a client that is purported to be Clinton's deleted 30,000 emails, acquired from a dark web forum. Schmitz meets with officials at the FBI, the State Department, and the Intelligence Community Inspector General (ICIG) in an effort to get the emails reviewed. The State Department and ICIG decline to review the emails. Schmitz's efforts are independent of the investigation by Peter Smith's team.
  - Facebook board member Marc Andreessen hosts a meeting with Facebook executives and Cambridge Analytica's Christopher Wylie to discuss what Cambridge Analytica is doing with the Facebook data they harvested.
- July:
  - The IRA's translator project grows to over 80 employees.
  - Carter Page makes a five-day trip to Moscow. The Steele dossier alleges that in July, during his Moscow trip, Page met Rosneft chairman Igor Sechin, and discussed the possible lifting of sanctions against Russia. In his congressional testimony, Page denies meeting with the Russians named in the dossier. He says he met Sechin's associate Andrey Baranov, but says "nothing that this gentleman said to me ever implied or asked for anything related to sanctions. Again, there may have been some general reference ... but no kind of negotiations in any format".
- July 5:
  - At his London office, Steele reveals to an FBI agent from Rome some of his findings that indicate a wide-ranging Russian conspiracy to elect Trump.
  - "United Muslims of America", an IRA group, orders posters with fake Clinton quotes promoting Sharia Law. The posters are ordered for the "Support Hillary, Save American Muslims" rally they are organizing.
- July 5–6: Denis Klimentov emails his brother Dmitri and Director of the MFA's Information and Press Department Maria Zakharova about Page's visit to Moscow and his connection to the Trump campaign. He offers to contact Page on behalf of the MFA. Dmitri Klimentov then contacts Peskov about introducing Page to Russian government officials. The next day, Peskov replies, "I have read about [Page]. Specialists say that he is far from being the main one. So I better not initiate a meeting in the Kremlin."
- July 6:
  - "Guccifer 2.0" releases another cache of DNC documents and sends copies to The Hill.
  - Assange, as "WikiLeaks", asks "Guccifer 2.0" via Twitter direct messaging to provide any information related to Clinton they may have.
- July 6–10: The IRA's "Don't Shoot" Facebook group and affiliated "Don't Shoot Us" website try to organize a protest outside the St. Paul, Minnesota, police headquarters on July 10 in response to the July 6 fatal police shooting of Philando Castile. Some local activists become suspicious of the event because St. Paul police were not involved in the shooting: Castile was shot by a St. Anthony police officer in nearby Falcon Heights. Local activists contact Don't Shoot. After being pressed on who they are and who supports them, Don't Shoot agrees to move the protest to the St. Anthony police headquarters. The concerned local activists investigate further and urge protesters not to participate after deciding Don't Shoot is a "total troll job." Don't Shoot organizers eventually relinquish control of the event to local organizers, who subsequently decline to accept any money from Don't Shoot.
- July 7:
  - In a lecture at the New Economic School in Moscow, Page criticizes American foreign policy, saying that many of the mistakes spoiling relations between the US and Russia "originated in my own country." Page had received permission from the Trump campaign to make the trip.
  - In an email exchange, Manafort and Kilimnik discuss whether his campaign work is helping his relationship with Deripaska. Kilimnik writes that Deripaska is paying significantly more attention to the campaign and expects him to reach out to Manafort soon. Using his official Trump campaign email address, Manafort asks Kilimnik to forward an offer to provide "private briefings" to Deripaska.
- July 8:
  - Page gives the commencement address at the New Economic School and criticizes "U.S. policy toward Russia for being too harsh".
  - Page emails Dahl and Gordon about outreach he received "from a few Russian legislators and senior members of the Presidential Administration here."
- July 9:
  - The Washington Post reports that Trump is considering Flynn as his running mate, with support from Senator Jeff Sessions. Trump eventually selects Mike Pence, Governor of Indiana.
  - The "Support Hillary, Save American Muslims" rally occurs in Washington, D.C. The rally is organized by the IRA group "United Muslims of America."
  - Page emails Clovis and describes a private meeting with Deputy Prime Minister of Russia Arkady Dvorkovich. He says Dvorkovich "expressed strong support for Mr. Trump and a desire to work together toward devising better solutions in response to the vast range of current international problems."
- July 10:
  - A Black Lives Matter protest rally is held in Dallas. A "Blue Lives Matter" counterprotest is held across the street. The Blue Lives Matter protest is organized by the "Heart of Texas" Facebook group, controlled by the IRA.
  - DNC staffer Seth Rich is murdered in the Bloomingdale neighborhood of Washington, D.C., a block from his home. Assange makes statements about Rich in July and August implying that he is the source of the stolen DNC emails.
- July 11–12:
  - FBI informant Stefan Halper has an initial encounter with Carter Page at a London symposium. A former federal law enforcement official tells The New York Times the encounter was a coincidence, rather than at the FBI's direction.
  - Papadopoulos and fellow campaign foreign policy advisor Walid Phares exchange emails discussing the upcoming Transatlantic Parliamentary Group on Counterterrorism (TAG) conference, of which Phares is also co-secretary general. In the email chain, Phares advises Papadopoulos that other summit attendees "are very nervous about Russia. So be aware."
- July 12:
  - An IRA group buys ads on Facebook for the "Down with Hillary" rally in New York City.
  - The Illinois State Board of Elections discovers some of its servers have been hacked and closes the security hole used to compromise the systems.
- July 13:
  - A hacker or group calling themselves "Guccifer 2.0" releases over 10,000 names from the DNC in two spreadsheets and a list of objectionable quotes from Sarah Palin.
  - Kukes donates $49,000 to the Trump Victory fund. In 2017, his 2016 political donations become a subject of the Mueller investigation.
  - The Illinois State Board of Elections takes its website offline.
- July 14:
  - "Guccifer 2.0" sends Assange an encrypted 1 GB file containing stolen DNC emails, and Assange confirms that he received it. WikiLeaks publishes the file's contents on July 22.
  - German hackers Andrew Müller-Maguhn and Bernd Fix meet with Assange for at least four hours. Müller-Maguhn is named in the Mueller report as a possible conduit for delivering hacked emails to Assange.
- July 15:
  - Sergei Millian reaches out to Papadopoulos on LinkedIn, introducing himself "as president of [the] New York-based Russian American Chamber of Commerce." He claims to have "insider knowledge and direct access to the top hierarchy in Russian politics."
  - Bill Browder files a FARA complaint with the DoJ against Akhmetshin, Glen Simpson, and others for working as unregistered lobbyists for Russia.
- July 16:
  - The IRA's Blacktivist group organizes a rally in Chicago to honor Sandra Bland on the first anniversary of her death. The rally is held in front of the Chicago Police Department's Homan Square building. Participants pass around petitions calling for a Civilian Police Accountability Council ordinance.
  - Papadopoulos, Clovis, and Phares attend the TAG conference. Contemporaneous handwritten notes in Papadopoulos's journal show that he, Clovis, and Phares discuss potential September meetings with representatives of the "office of Putin" in London. The notes say they will attend as unofficial campaign representatives. Later Clovis tells a grand jury that he does not recall attending the TAG conference, although a photograph from the conference shows him seated next to Papadopoulos.
- July 18:
  - "Guccifer 2.0" dumps a new batch of documents from the DNC servers, including personal information of 20,000 Republican donors and opposition research on Trump.
  - An Ecuadorian security guard is caught on video receiving a package outside the London embassy from a man wearing a mask and sunglasses. Later that day, Wikileaks tells Russian hackers that it received files and will be publishing them soon.
- July 18–21: Republican Convention in Cleveland
  - Nigel Farage encounters Stone and Alex Jones at a restaurant. The next day, Stone contacts Manafort and suggests a meeting between Trump and Farage. Manafort responds that he will pass on the request.
  - July 18:
    - Kislyak attends the convention, meeting Page and Gordon; as Trump's foreign policy advisers, they stress that he would like to improve relations with Russia. Sessions speaks with Kislyak at a Heritage Foundation event.
    - Gordon lobbies to remove arms sales to Ukraine from the Republican platform, citing concerns over conflict escalation in Donbas. In December 2017, Diana Denman, a Republican delegate who supported the weapons sale, says that Trump directed Gordon to weaken that position.
  - July 21:
    - Trump formally accepts the Republican nomination.
    - Farage and Andy Wigmore encounter staffers for Mississippi Governor Phil Bryant at the bar in the Hilton Hotel. A staffer invites Wigmore and Farage to Mississippi.
- July 19:
  - The Illinois State Board of Elections informs the Illinois Attorney General (IAG) and the Illinois General Assembly of the breach. The IAG notifies the FBI, which brings in the Department of Homeland Security to help investigate.
  - Around this date, but prior to July 22, according to Cohen, Stone calls Trump in his Trump Tower office and tells him that he just got off the phone with Assange and Wikileaks will be releasing information within a few days.
- July 21 – August 12: The Illinois State Board of Elections brings its website back online. The GRU attacks the system five times per second before giving up on August 12.
- July 22: WikiLeaks publishes 20,000 emails from seven key DNC officials. The emails show them disparaging Bernie Sanders and favoring Hillary Clinton in the 2016 presidential primaries.
- July 22–26: Papadopoulos asks Timofeev about Millian. Timofeev responds that he has not heard of him.
- July 23: The IRA-organized "Down with Hillary" rally is held in New York City. The agency sends 30 news releases to media outlets using the first email address.
- July 24:
  - DNC Chairwoman Debbie Wasserman Schultz is forced to resign because of the WikiLeaks email publication.
  - Appearing on This Week, Manafort denies there are any links between him, Trump, or the "campaign and Putin and his regime".
- July 25–28: Democratic Convention in Philadelphia.
- July 25:
  - Based on assessments from cybersecurity firms, the DNC and the Clinton campaign say that Russian intelligence operators have hacked their e-mails and forwarded them to WikiLeaks.
  - Stone emails his associate Jerome Corsi, "Get to (Assange) [a]t Ecuadorian Embassy in London and get the pending (WikiLeaks) emails". Corsi later passes this along to Ted Malloch, a conservative author in London.
  - The FBI announces that it is investigating the DNC hack.
- July 26:
  - Trump denies having any investments in Russia.
  - The Australian government informs the U.S. government of Papadopoulos's May 6 interactions with their ambassador in London. The FBI opens its investigation of potential coordination between Russia and the Trump campaign five days later.
  - Secretary of State John Kerry warns Lavrov that Russian interference in the U.S. elections is serious and poses a risk to the U.S.–Russia bilateral relationship.
- July 27:
  - On or about this date "the Conspirators attempted after hours to spearphish for the first time email accounts at a domain hosted by a third-party provider and used by Clinton's personal office. At or around the same time, they also targeted seventy-six email addresses at the domain for the Clinton Campaign."
  - Trump calls for Russia to give Clinton's missing emails to the FBI. His tweet is before his statements on the matter to the press.
  - Trump tells Jim DeFede on CBS4 News in Miami, "I have nothing to do with Russia. Nothing to do. I never met Putin. I have nothing to do with Russia whatsoever." This contradicts his many claims since 2013 to have met Putin and done business in Russia. Shortly afterwards, he asks Cohen about the status of the Trump Tower Moscow project.
  - At a news conference, Trump says "Russia, if you're listening, I hope you're able to find the 30,000 emails that are missing," regarding Clinton's missing emails. The remark triggers a backlash from media and politicians who criticize Trump's "urging a foreign adversary to conduct cyberespionage" against his political opponent. Trump responds that he was being "sarcastic". A 2018 indictment alleges Russian intelligence officers began a spearphishing attack on non-public Clinton campaign email accounts that night, In April–May 2018, Flynn tells Mueller's team that after this event, Trump repeatedly asks "individuals affiliated with his Campaign[sic]" to find Clinton's emails.
  - On CBS This Morning, in response to a question from Norah O'Donnell, Manafort denies any financial relationship between Trump and Russia.
- July 28: Clinton formally accepts the Democratic nomination.
- July 29:
  - Kilimnik sends Manafort an email requesting to meet in person so he can brief Manafort on a meeting he had "with the guy who gave you your biggest black caviar jar several years ago", saying he has important messages to deliver from this person. In September 2017, The Washington Post reports that investigators believe Kilimnik and Manafort used the term "black caviar" in communications as a reference to expected payments from former clients. In December 2018, Time magazine reveals that the names "Victor" and "V." mentioned in the emails between Kilimnik and Manafort refer to Deripaska aide and former Russian intelligence officer Commander Viktor A. Boyarkin. In 2018, Manafort tells Mueller's team that "the guy" was Yanukovych, who gave him a $30,000–$40,000 jar of caviar in 2010 to celebrate being elected President of Ukraine.
  - Cambridge Analytica employee Emily Cornell sends an email to people working with the pro-Trump Make America Number 1 super PAC, which is funded by Robert and Rebekah Mercer. Cornell notes Cambridge Analytica's work for the super PAC and suggests they capitalize on the recently released DNC emails and any Clinton emails that may be stolen as suggested by Trump on July 27.
- July 30: Papadopoulos meets with Millian in New York City.
- July 31:
  - The FBI starts a counter-intelligence investigation into Russian interference, including possible coordination between Trump associates and Russia. The investigation is issued the code name "Crossfire Hurricane."
  - In an interview on This Week, Trump tells George Stephanopoulos that people in his campaign were responsible for changing the GOP's platform stance on Ukraine, but that he was not personally involved.
  - Manafort tells Chuck Todd on Meet the Press that the Trump campaign was not involved in changing the GOP's platform stance on Ukraine.
  - Kilimnik again emails Manafort to confirm their dinner meeting in New York, saying he needs two hours "because it is a long caviar story to tell."
  - Stone emails Jerome Corsi telling him to use Ted Malloch as an intermediary with Assange. Malloch tells Corsi he does not have a relationship with Assange and suggests using people close to Farage instead.
  - Papadopoulos emails Trump campaign official Bo Denysyk saying that he has been contacted "by some leaders of Russian-American voters here in the US about their interest in voting for Mr. Trump." He asks whether he should put Denysyk in contact with their group (the U.S.–Russia chamber of commerce). Denysyk responds that Papadopoulos should "hold off with outreach to Russian-Americans" because "too many articles" portray the campaign, Manafort, and Trump as "pro-Russian."
- July 31 – August 2: The FBI sends two agents to London who interview Downer about his interactions with Papadopoulos.
- End July: CIA Director John Brennan, alarmed at intelligence that Russia is trying to "hack" the election, forms a working group of officials from the CIA, FBI, and NSA.

=== August 2016 ===
- August:
  - In classified briefings in August and September 2016, the CIA informs the Gang of Eight that "there was intelligence indicating not only that the Russians were trying to get Mr. Trump elected but that they had gained computer access to multiple state and local election boards in the United States since 2014".
  - Trump donor Rebekah Mercer asks the CEO of Cambridge Analytica whether the company could better organize the Clinton-related emails being released by WikiLeaks.
  - Butina arrives in the U.S. on a student visa to attend American University in Washington, D.C.
  - With his lawyer, "Max" reveals data assembled to Eric Lichtblau of The New York Times.
  - Crossfire Hurricane investigators discuss obtaining a warrant to wiretap Carter Page with their DoJ superiors.
  - Ivanka Trump and Jared Kushner vacation in Croatia with a "Russian billionaire".
- August 1: Papadopoulos meets with Millian a second time in New York City.
- August 2:
  - Manafort, Gates, and Kilimnik meet at the Grand Havana Room of 666 Fifth Avenue in New York City. This meeting is considered the "heart" of Mueller's probe, per February 2019 reporting. Manafort gives Kilimnik polling data and a briefing on campaign strategy, and, according to Gates, discusses the "battleground" states Michigan, Minnesota, Pennsylvania, and Wisconsin. Manafort asks Kilimnik to pass the data to pro-Russian Ukrainians Serhiy Lyovochkin and Rinat Akhmetov, and to Oleg Deripaska. Kilimnik gives Manafort a message from Yanukovych about a peace plan for Ukraine that is an opportunity for Russian control of the region. The plan would require Trump's support and Manafort's influence in Europe. The two discuss Manafort's financial disputes with Deripaska and the Opposition Bloc in Ukraine. They leave separately to avoid media reporting on Manafort's connections to Kilimnik. Later, Kilimnik passes the campaign data to the Russian government.
  - Corsi writes to Stone: "Word is friend in embassy plans 2 more dumps," referring to Assange; and "One shortly after I'm back. 2nd in Oct. Impact planned to be very damaging."
- August 2–3:
  - The IRA's "Matt Skiber" persona contacts the real "Florida for Trump" Facebook account. The "T.W." persona contacts other grassroots groups.
  - Millian invites Papadopoulos to attend and possibly speak at two international energy conferences, including one in Moscow in September. Papadopoulos does not attend the conferences.
- August 3:
  - Trump Jr., George Nader, Erik Prince, Stephen Miller, and Joel Zamel meet at Trump Jr.'s office in Trump Tower. Nader relays an offer from the leaders of Saudi Arabia and the United Arab Emirates (UAE) to help get Trump elected. Zamel pitches his Israeli company's services for a multimillion-dollar campaign to manipulate social media. It is not known whether the social media campaign occurred.
  - A private jet carrying Deripaska's wife, daughter, mother, and father-in-law arrives at Teterboro Airport near New York City a little after midnight New York time and returns to Moscow that afternoon. The trip's timing is considered suspicious because it is within hours of Manafort's meeting with Kilimnik. In 2018, a spokesperson for Deripaska confirms the flights and passengers.
  - Gordon receives an invitation from a Russian Embassy official to have breakfast with Kislyak at the Ambassador's residence in Washington, D.C., the next week. Gordon declines five days later, saying he is busy with debate preparation.
  - The Russian Foreign Ministry transfers $30,000 to its embassy's Citibank account in the U.S. with the memo line "to finance election campaign of 2016". The transaction triggers an internal investigation at Citibank that finds 60 transfers totaling $380,000 with similar memo lines to accounts at the bank for Russian embassies in 60 countries. The transactions are flagged as suspicious, reported to the U.S. government, and investigated by the FBI in 2017. In November 2017, BuzzFeed News reports the story after failing to get a response from the Ministry. Within hours, the Ministry denounces the BuzzFeed article on social media and implies the money was for polling stations for the Russian parliamentary election on September 18.
  - Speaking at a press breakfast sponsored by the Christian Science Monitor, DHS Secretary Jeh Johnson suggests for the first time that election infrastructure should be designated as critical infrastructure.
- August 4:
  - During a previously scheduled call to discuss Syria and counterterrorism issues, Brennan warns his Russian counterpart Alexander Bortnikov, head of the FSB, against meddling in the presidential election.
  - The IRA's Facebook account "Stop AI" accuses Clinton of voter fraud during the Iowa Caucuses. They buy ads promoting the post.
  - IRA groups buy ads for the "Florida Goes Trump" rallies. The 8,300 people who click on the ads are sent to the Agency's "Being Patriotic" Facebook page.
  - In an InfoWars interview, Stone tells Jones that Assange has proof of wrongdoing by the Clinton Foundation and is ready to release it.
  - Stone sends Sam Nunberg an email in which he claims that he dined with Assange the night before.
  - The Hill publishes an article by Ukrainian ambassador to the U.S. Valeriy Chaly in which he chastises Trump for his recent comments on Crimea. The article is later pointed to by Republicans as evidence that Ukraine allegedly interfered in the election.
- August 5:
  - Stone writes an article for Breitbart News in which he insists "Guccifer 2.0" hacked the DNC, using statements by "Guccifer 2.0" on Twitter and to The Hill as evidence for his claim. He tries to spin the DNC's Russia claim as a coverup for their supposed embarrassment over being penetrated by a single hacker. The article leads to "Guccifer 2.0" reaching out to and conversing with Stone via Twitter.
  - In response to questions about Page's July 7 speech in Moscow, Hope Hicks describes him as an "informal foreign policy adviser [who] does not speak for Mr. Trump or the campaign."
  - The IRA first Twitter account hires an actress to play Hillary Clinton in prison garb and someone to build a cage to hold the actress. The actress and cage are to appear at the "Florida Goes Trump" rally in West Palm Beach, Florida on August 20.
  - The Trump campaign announces that Calk is joining Trump's economic advisory team.
- August 6: Assange addresses the Green Party National Convention in Houston by videolink, to discuss the hacked DNC documents published by WikiLeaks. Green candidate Jill Stein later states she does not know why or how this address was arranged.
- August 8: Stone, speaking in Florida to the Southwest Broward Republican Organization, claims he is in contact with Assange, saying, "I actually have communicated with Assange. I believe his next tranche of his documents pertain to the Clinton Foundation." This is Stone's first public statement about his contacts with Assange. Stone later claims the communications were through an intermediary.
- August 9:
  - WikiLeaks denies having communicated with Stone. Privately, Assange tells a core group of WikiLeaks supporters that he is unaware of any communications with Stone.
  - Bloomberg reports that the Spanish Civil Guard believes Torshin assisted the Taganskaya crime syndicate with money laundering through banks in Spain.
- August 10:
  - The FBI opens separate counterintelligence Foreign Agents Registration Act (FARA) cases on Page, Manafort, and Papadopoulos on the grounds that they "may wittingly or unwittingly be involved in activity on behalf of the Russian Federation which may constitute a federal crime or threat to the national security."
- August 11:
  - The IRA second Twitter account claims that voter fraud is being investigated in North Carolina.
  - Brennan briefs Pelosi, a member of the Gang of Eight, on links between the Trump campaign and Russian interference in the election.
- August 12:
  - In a #MAGA Podcast, Stone says Assange has all the emails deleted by Huma Abedin and Cheryl Mills.
  - Journalist Emma Best has two simultaneous conversations by Twitter direct message with "Guccifer 2.0" and WikiLeaks. Best tries to negotiate the hosting of stolen DNC emails and documents on archive.org. WikiLeaks wants Best to act as an intermediary to funnel the material from "Guccifer 2.0" to them. The conversation ends with "Guccifer 2.0" saying he will send the material directly to WikiLeaks.
  - "Guccifer 2.0" releases a cache of documents stolen from the Democratic Congressional Campaign Committee.
  - The GRU stops its five-attempts-per-second attack on the Illinois State Board of Elections servers.
- August 12–18: The IRA's persona "Josh Milton" communicates with Trump Campaign officials via email to request Trump/Pence signs and the phone numbers of campaign affiliates as part of an effort to organize pro-Trump campaign rallies in Florida.
- August 13:
  - Twitter and WordPress temporarily suspend Guccifer 2.0's accounts. Stone calls "Guccifer 2.0" a hero.
  - Russian-American Simon Kukes attends a $25,000-per-ticket Trump fundraising dinner at the home of Woody Johnson in New York. Kukes's 2016 political donations become a subject of the Mueller investigation.
  - On or before this date, Stone tells Bannon that he has a connection to Assange and implies that he has inside information about WikiLeaks.
- August 14: The New York Times reports that Manafort's name has been found in the Ukrainian "black ledger". The ledger, belonging to the Ukrainian Party of Regions, shows $12.7 million in undisclosed cash payments to Manafort from 2007 to 2012. Manafort's lawyer, Richard A. Hibey, says Manafort never received "any such cash payments". The Associated Press later verifies some of the entries against financial records.
- August 15:
  - Papadopoulos emails Clovis about requests he received from multiple foreign governments, "even Russia[]," for "closed door workshops/consultations abroad." He asks if there is still interest for himself, Clovis, and Phares "to go on that trip." Clovis copies Phares and tells Papadopoulos that he cannot "travel before the election", writing, "I would encourage you [and Walid Phares to] make the trip, if it is feasible." The trip never occurs.
  - A Trump campaign county chair contacts the IRA through their phony email accounts to suggest locations for rallies.
  - A candidate for Congress allegedly contacts Guccifer 2.0 to request information on the candidate's opponent. Guccifer 2.0 responds with the requested stolen information.
  - Guccifer 2.0 begins posting information about Florida and Pennsylvania races stolen from the DCCC.
  - DHS Secretary Johnson holds a conference call with state election officials in which he urges them "to do everything you can for your own cybersecurity leading up to the election." He tells them there is no specific or credible threat known around the election system itself. He raises the possibility of designating election infrastructure as critical infrastructure, but receives so much push back from some states concerned about federal interference in running elections that he puts the idea on hold.
- August 16:
  - Stone tells Jones that he is in contact with Assange, claiming he has "political dynamite" on Clinton.
  - The IRA buys ads on Instagram for the "Florida Goes Trump" rallies.
  - Stone sends "Guccifer 2.0" an article he wrote for The Hill on manipulating the vote count in voting machines. "Guccifer 2.0" responds the next day, "@RogerJStoneJr paying u back".
  - The FBI opens a counterintelligence FARA case on Flynn on the grounds that he "may wittingly or unwittingly be involved in activity on behalf of the Russian Federation which may constitute a federal crime or threat to the national security." The investigation is named Crossfire Razor.
- August 17:
  Summary documenting the intelligence brief given to Trump, Flynn, and Christie on August 17, 2016.
  - Trump is warned in an FBI briefing that foreign adversaries including Russia would likely attempt to infiltrate his campaign. This is Trump's first classified briefing. Clinton receives a similar briefing in the same month. An FBI agent took notes on Trump's, Christie's, and Flynn's comments on Russia as part of the Crossfire Hurricane and Crossfire Razor investigations.
  - Bannon is named Trump campaign CEO.
  - Kellyanne Conway is named Trump campaign manager.
  - Simes and Kushner meet at Kushner's New York office to discuss CNI's foreign policy advice and the Clinton campaign's Russia-related attacks on Trump. Simes gives Kushner unverified information from the 1990s about Bill Clinton and Russia. In 2018, Simes tells Mueller's team that Kushner was uninterested because he considered it "old news".
  - The CIA informs the FBI that Page was an "operational contact" for the agency from 2008 to 2013.
  - Brennan briefs Schiff, a member of the Gang of Eight, on links between the Trump campaign and Russian interference in the election.
- August 18:
  - The FBI issues a nationwide "flash alert" warning state election officials about foreign infiltration of election systems in two states, later reported to be Arizona and Illinois. The alert includes technical evidence suggesting Russian responsibility, and urges states to boost their cyberdefenses. Although labeled for distribution only to "NEED TO KNOW recipients," a copy is leaked to the media.
  - The IRA uses its first email address to contact a Trump campaign official in Florida. The email requests campaign support at the forthcoming "Florida Goes Trump" rallies. It is unknown whether the campaign official responded.
  - The IRA pays the person they hired to build a cage for a "Florida Goes Trump" rally in West Palm Beach, Florida.
- August 19:
  - Ukrainian Member of Parliament Serhiy Leshchenko holds a press conference in Kyiv in which he reveals hand-written entries in the "black ledger" showing payments to Manafort.
  - Manafort resigns as Trump's campaign manager, but continues to advise Gates, Kushner, Bannon, and Trump until the election.
  - A Trump supporter suggests to the IRA Twitter account "March for Trump" that it contact a Trump campaign official. The official is emailed by the agency's first email address.
  - The IRA's "Matt Skiber" persona contacts another Trump campaign official on Facebook.
  - Arron Banks and Andy Wigmore meet with Alexander Yakovenko for lunch. They discuss their upcoming trip to Mississippi and the Trump campaign.
  - Volodymyr Ariev, a member of the Ukrainian parliament, formally asks the Prosecutor General of Ukraine to investigate Kilimnik based on media reports of his connections to Viktor Yanukovych and Russian intelligence.
  - CNN reports that the FBI is investigating Manafort's company's involvement in Ukrainian corruption.
  - The FBI calls Cassandra Ford to discuss her Twitter account. Ford insists upon an in-person meeting because she received a lot of online harassment.
- August 20: 17 "Florida Goes Trump" rallies are held across Florida. The rallies are organized by Russian trolls from the IRA.
- August 21: President Obama returns from vacation, which was a soft deadline for United States National Security Council staffers to forward cyber-related responses to Russian election meddling to interagency groups that Obama authorized and Susan Rice and her deputy headed.
- August 22:
  - Florida GOP campaign advisor Aaron Nevins contacts Guccifer 2.0 and asks for material. Nevins sets up a Dropbox account and "Guccifer 2.0" transfers 2.5 gigabytes of data into it. Nevins analyzes the data, posts the results on his blog, HelloFLA.com, and sends "Guccifer 2.0" a link. "Guccifer 2.0" forwards the link to Stone.
  - "Guccifer 2.0" allegedly sends DCCC material on Black Lives Matter to a reporter, and they discuss how to use it in a story. "Guccifer 2.0" also gives the reporter the password for accessing emails stolen from Clinton's staff that were posted to "Guccifer 2.0's" website but had not yet been made public. On August 31, The Washington Examiner publishes a story based on the material the same day the material is released publicly on Guccifer 2.0's website.
- August 23:
  - The Smoking Gun reaches out to "Guccifer 2.0" for comment on its contacts with Stone. "Guccifer 2.0" accuses The Smoking Gun of working with the FBI.
  - Millian sends a Facebook message to Papadopoulos offering to "share with you a disruptive technology that might be instrumental in your political work for the campaign." In September 2017, Papadopoulos tells the FBI he does not recall the matter.
  - FBI agent Scott Halper and another agent meet with Ford to discuss her Twitter account. The meeting is conducted as a friendly chat rather than a formal interview.
- August 24: Seven VR Systems employee email accounts receive emails from same email telling them that their email storage is full. It contains a link to a fake Google webpage asking for their email address and password. The phishing emails are automatically quarantined by automated email filters, but the emails most likely are not reviewed by a person until the end of September when the FBI warns the company to look out for suspicious IP addresses.
- August 25:
  - Trump names Clovis as a campaign national co-chairman.
  - Banks, Wigmore, and Farage attend a Trump fundraising dinner and participate in a Trump rally in the Mississippi Coliseum. Wigmore and Farage meet Trump for the first time at the dinner. At the rally, Trump introduces Farage to the crowd as "Mr. Brexit."
  - Interviewed by Megyn Kelly on The Kelly File, Assange says that he will not release any damaging information on Trump. He also tells her significant information will be released on Clinton before November.
  - Arranged by Margaret Ratner Kunstler, a mutual friend who is Assange's attorney, Randy Credico hosts Assange on Credico's radio show.
  - Brennan briefs Senate Minority Leader Harry Reid, a member of the Gang of Eight, on links between the Trump campaign and Russian interference in the election.
- August 26:
  - After Clinton claims that Russian intelligence was behind the leaks, Assange says she is causing "hysteria" about Russia, adding, "The Trump campaign has a lot of things wrong with it, but as far as we can see being Russian agents is not one of them."
  - Illinois State Board of Elections produces a report on the June–August hacking of their systems by the GRU.
  - Credico texts Stone, "Julian Assange talk[ed] about you last night." Stone asks what Assange said, and Corsi replies that they discussed "how the Press is trying to make it look like you and he are in cahoots."
- August 26–27: Frederick Intrater registers several Internet domain names that are variations on the term "alt-right." The domain names are registered using his name and the name and contact information of his employer, private equity firm Columbus Nova. Intrater is the brother of Columbus Nova CEO Andrew Intrater and a cousin of Vekselberg. Columbus Nova is the American investment arm of Vekselberg's business empire.
- August 27:
  - The IRA Facebook group "SecuredBorders" organizes a "Citizens before refugees" protest rally at the City Council Chambers in Twin Falls, Idaho. Only a small number of people show up for the three-hour event, most likely because it is Saturday and the Chambers are closed.
  - Through Assange's attorney Margaret Ratner Kunstler, the widow of William Kunstler, Randy Credico knows that WikiLeaks will release information about the Clinton campaign in the near future and texts Stone that "Julian Assange has kryptonite on Hillary." Credico continues to update Stone about the upcoming WikiLeaks release of numerous emails stolen from Podesta and the Clinton campaign. The emails are released beginning on October 7.
- August 27–28: According to Smith's August 31 email, he holds four meetings in Virginia with individuals claiming to have access to Clinton's emails. According to John Szbocsan, Michael Flynn Jr., the son of Michael T. Flynn, is involved with the meetings.
- August 28: Peter W. Smith sends an encrypted email to an undisclosed list of recipients that includes Trump campaign co-chair Sam Clovis. The email says that after two days of meetings in D.C. on Clinton's private email server, he determined that the server was hacked by "State-related players" as well as private mercenaries. He writes, "Parties with varying interests, are circling to release ahead of the election."
- August 29: The Washington Post is the first to report that Illinois discovered in July that its voter registration servers were hacked, and that the user ID and password of an Arizona election official in Gila County was stolen in June. Arizona Secretary of State Michele Reagan shut down the state's voter registration system for a week but did not find that any state or county systems were compromised.
- August 31:
  - "Guccifer 2.0" leaks campaign documents stolen from House Minority Leader Nancy Pelosi's hacked personal computer.
  - An American contacts the IRA's "Being Patriotic" account about a possible September 11 event in Miami.
  - The IRA buys ads for a September 11 rally in New York City.
  - Smith sends an email to an undisclosed list of recipients in which he claims KLS Research met with parties who had access to Clinton's missing emails, including some with "ties and affiliations to Russia". Mueller's team is unable to determine whether such meetings occurred or find any evidence that Smith's team was in contact with Russian hackers.
- Late August–Early September:
  - According to December 2018 McClatchy DC reporting, Cohen's cellphone communicates with cell towers in the vicinity of Prague, and communication intercepts by an Eastern European intelligence agency overhear a Russian conversation that states Cohen is in Prague. If true, it would lend credence to the allegation in the Steele dossier that Cohen traveled to Prague to meet with Russians. The Mueller Report states that Cohen never traveled to Prague.
  - August 31 or September 1: FBI informant Stefan Halper meets with Trump advisor Sam Clovis, who stated they talked about China.

=== September 2016 ===
- September:
  - The Egyptian Embassy in Washington, D.C., reaches out to Papadopoulos expressing Egyptian President Abdel Fattah el-Sisi's interest in meeting Trump. With Bannon's approval, Papadopoulos arranges a meeting between Trump and el-Sisi at the Plaza Hotel in New York City. While the meeting does not appear to relate to campaign contacts with Russia, it highlights that Papadopoulos was more than a "coffee boy", as Trump campaign officials later claim.
  - The CIA gives a secret briefing to congressional leaders on Russian interference in the election. Senate Majority Leader Mitch McConnell voices doubts about the intelligence.
  - Mifsud hires Mangiante to work for the London Centre of International Law Practice, on Pittella's recommendation. Papadopoulos, a former employee of the Centre, contacts her via LinkedIn. They begin dating in March 2017.
  - Stone emails Credico to ask Assange for Clinton emails from August 10–30, 2011.
  - The FBI makes a second attempt to recruit Deripaska as an informant on Manafort, the Kremlin, and Russian organized crime in exchange for a U.S. visa.
- September 1: Putin denies Russian government involvement in the DNC hacking. He says the important thing is not who stole the material, but that it was released to the public.
- September 2:
  - Lisa Page writes in a text message to Peter Strzok that a meeting at the FBI was set up "because Obama wanted 'to know everything we are doing'." She was referring to the FBI investigation into Russian interference in the 2016 election, not the Clinton emails investigation, which had been concluded months earlier.
  - Peter W. Smith and John Szobocsan incorporate "KLS Research", an LLC registered in Delaware, as a vehicle to manage funds raised to pay for the search for Clinton's emails and "to avoid campaign reporting." KLS is structured as an "independent expenditure group," which is forbidden by law from coordinating with the Trump campaign. Over $30,000 flows through the company during the campaign.
- September 3: The IRA Facebook group "United Muslims of America" organizes a "Safe Space for Muslim Neighborhood" rally outside the White House, attracting at least 57 people.

- September 3–5: Wealthy Republican donor Peter W. Smith gathers a team to try to acquire the 30,000 deleted Clinton emails from hackers. He believes Clinton's private email server was hacked and copies of the emails were stolen. Among the people recruited are former GCHQ information-security specialist Matt Tait, alt-right activist Charles C. Johnson, former Business Insider CTO and alt-right activist Pax Dickinson, "dark web expert" Royal O'Brien, and Jonathan Safron. Tait quickly abandons the team after learning the true purpose of the endeavor. Hackers contacted in the search include "Guccifer 2.0" and Andrew Auernheimer (a.k.a. "weev"). The team finds five groups of hackers claiming to have the emails. Two of the groups are Russian. Flynn is in email contact with the team. Smith commits suicide on May 14, 2017, about ten days after telling the story to The Wall Street Journal but before the story is published in June.
- September 5: At the 2016 G20 Hangzhou summit, Obama confronts Putin about Russian cyber attacks, telling him to stop. Putin explains Russia's stance on the issue.
- September 6:
  - Smith emails David Bossie, recently made Trump's deputy campaign manager, to arrange a phone call to discuss Smith's search for Clinton's emails.
  - Brennan briefs individually the remaining Gang of Eight members – McConnell, Burr, Feinstein, Nunes, and Ryan – on links between the Trump campaign and Russian interference in the election.
- September 8:
  - Smith transfers $9,500 from KLS Research to his personal account, then withdraws $4,900 of it in cash and writes checks for the remaining amount. In August 2018, BuzzFeed News reports that the FBI suspects the money was used to pay hackers.
  - Sessions meets with Kislyak a third time in his Senate office with two members of his Senate staff, Sandra Luff and Pete Landrum. They discuss Russian military actions and the presence of NATO forces in former Soviet bloc countries bordering Russia. Kislyak invites Sessions to have further discussions with him over a meal at his residence. In 2018, Luff and Landrum tell Mueller's team that they do not recall Sessions dining with Kislyak before the election.
  - Comey, Homeland Security Advisor Lisa Monaco, and Secretary Johnson brief the Gang of Eight and the chairs and ranking members of the House and Senate Homeland Security Committees on Russian interference activities. They request a bipartisan Congressional statement to help convince state and local election officials to avail themselves of DHS security assistance. Several members of Congress resist making a statement, and McConnel implies the intelligence on Russia is being manipulated in a partisan way.
- September 9:
  - Papadopoulos contacts deputy communications director Bryan Lanza about a request from Interfax for an interview with Ksenia Baygarova. Lanza approves the interview.
  - The IRA sends money to its American groups to fund the September 11 rally in Miami, and to pay the actress who portrayed Clinton at the West Palm Beach, Florida, rally.
  - Smith circulates a document claiming his Clinton email search initiative is being performed in coordination with the Trump campaign "to the extent permitted as an independent expenditure organization." The document lists Flynn, Clovis, Bannon, and Conway as involved campaign members, and Corsi under "Independent Groups/Organizations/Individuals". Later, Mueller's team is unable to confirm the active participation of Bannon and Conway.
  - The IRA registers PlayWithHillary.com and Hilltendo.com, and subsequently releases a Flash game called "Hilltendo" that features Clinton deleting classified emails, catching bags of money, and throwing the constitution as far as possible. The game is announced on Reddit by the user "Rubinjer". It contains code that allows the IRA to identify who plays the game.
  - "Guccifer 2.0" asks Stone to review a stolen DCCC document posted online. Stone responds, "pretty standard."
- Mid-September: Papadopoulos approaches British government officials asking for a meeting with senior ministers. He is given a meeting with a mid-level Foreign Office official in London. Papadopoulos mentions he has senior contacts in the Russian government. British officials conclude he is not a major player and discontinue contact.
- September 11:
  - A pro-Trump rally organized by the IRA is held in Miami. The rally includes a flatbed truck with a person dressed as Clinton in a prison jumpsuit inside a cage, all paid for by the IRA.
  - After Clinton falls ill during a 9/11 memorial service in New York City, IRA trolls tweet hundreds of messages with the hashtags #HillarySickAtGroundZero, #ClintonCollapse, #ZombieHillary, and #SickHillary targeting left-wing and right-wing accounts.
  - GOP consultant Doug Wead informs translator Olga Kovalova that Russian national Roman Vasilenko can meet with Trump when he visits the U.S.
- September 12: Smith tells Tait in a phone call that he received a sample of Clinton's emails from a credible source through a "dark web specialist."
- September 13–14: GOP consultant Jesse Benton tells the RNC that he wants to arrange a photo of a "friend" with Trump at an upcoming September 22 event in Philadelphia, and proceeds to make the arrangements.
- September 15:
  - DCLeaks sends a Twitter direct message to WikiLeaks asking how to discuss submission-related issues because WikiLeaks is not responding to messages on their secure chat and DCLeaks has something of interest to share.
  - "Guccifer 2.0" sends a Twitter direct message to DCLeaks informing them that WikiLeaks is trying to contact them to set up communications using encrypted emails.
  - Papadopoulos meets with Stefan Halper's research assistant Azra Turk for drinks in London. She asks him questions about whether the Trump campaign was working with Russia. Papadopoulos becomes suspicious about the line of questioning and comes to believe Turk is an intelligence agent, possibly from Turkey. In May 2019, The New York Times reports that Turk was an undercover FBI agent supervising Halper's inquiries into possible connections between the Trump Campaign and Russia.
  - Barbara Ledeen signs a non-disclosure agreement with KLS Research. She also emails Flynn that her project to find Clinton's emails "is mostly funded."
  - Benton emails Wead his banking information and promises an invoice "whenever appropriate."
- September 16:
  - Ledeen emails Smith about a cache of purported Clinton emails she says she found on the dark web. She asks for help raising money to pay for a technical advisor to authenticate the emails. Erik Prince provides the money. In April 2018 Prince tells Mueller's team that the technical advisor determined that the emails were forgeries.
  - DHS Secretary Johnson issues a public statement about cybersecurity and election systems that acknowledges "cyber intrusions involving political institutions and personal communications" and "some efforts at cyber intrusions of voter registration data maintained in state election systems."
  - Wead tells Benton to send an invoice for "consulting work" to Vasilenko.
- September 18–19: Stone asks Credico to ask Assange for State Department or Clinton emails from August 10–30, 2011. Credico passes the request to Kunstler, who tells Mueller's investigators in 2018 that she did not pass it on to Assange.
- September 19:
  - Crossfire Hurricane investigators obtain Steele dossier.
  - Vasilenko wires $49,000 to Benton. Afterward, Wead tells Benton to provide an invoice for Vasilenko's records. Benton provides an invoice for $100,000.

- September 20:
  - Flynn meets with Rohrabacher. On November 10, 2017, the Mueller investigation is reported to have asked questions about this meeting.
  - GRU hackers compromise a DNC account on a cloud-computing service and begin copying 300 GB of data off of the servers.
  - While browsing a political chatroom, Jason Fishbein comes across the password to a non-public website (PutinTrump.org) focusing on Trump's ties to Russia that is nearing launch. He sends the password and website to WikiLeaks in a Twitter direct message. WikiLeaks tweets about the website and password.
  - Wead informs Benton that Vasilenko has arrived in the U.S.
- September 20–26: BlackMattersUS, an IRA website, recruits activists to participate in protests over the police shooting of Keith Lamont Scott in Charlotte, North Carolina. The IRA pays for expenses such as microphones and speakers.
- September 21:
  - The New York Times delivers potential evidence of communications with Trump's domain with Alfa-Bank and other entities to BGR Group, a Washington lobbying firm that worked for Alfa-Bank, from a story Lichtblau was pursuing following findings "Max" and his lawyer decided to hand over to him.
  - WikiLeaks sends a Twitter direct message to Trump Jr. about the password to PutinTrump.org. Several hours later, Trump Jr. emails senior campaign staff about the WikiLeaks direct message and website, including Conway, Bannon, Kushner, David Bossie, and Brad Parscale. After the public launch of PutinTrump.org, Trump Jr. sends a Twitter direct message to WikiLeaks, "Off the record, l don't know who that is but I'll ask around. Thanks." This is believed to be the first direct communication between Trump Jr. and WikiLeaks.
- September 22:
  - Senator Dianne Feinstein and Representative Adam Schiff issue a statement warning that Russia is trying to undermine the election. Their warning is based on what they learned from intelligence briefings as members of the Gang of Eight. It is the first and only public statement prior to the December 29 Joint Analysis Report attributing cyber activity to Russian actors and election influence efforts to Russian intelligence services.
  - The IRA buys ads on Facebook for "Miners for Trump" rallies in Pennsylvania.
  - DCLeaks sends an encrypted file to WikiLeaks and, separately, a tweet with a string of characters. The Mueller Report suspects that this was a transfer of stolen documents, but does not rule out that Andrew "Andy" Müller-Maguhn or another intermediary may have hand-delivered the documents. In 2018, Müller-Maguhn, a known hacker and frequent visitor to Assange, denies transporting material to him.
  - Wead photographs Vasilenko with Trump at the Philadelphia fundraising event.
- Late September/October: Benton pays $25,000 to a joint fundraising committee for the Trump campaign and the RNC.
- September 23:
  - Yahoo News reports that U.S. intelligence officials are investigating whether Carter Page has set up private communications between the Trump campaign and senior Russian officials, including talks on possibly lifting sanctions if Trump is elected. The report leads to an email discussion between J. Miller, Bannon, and Stephen Miller about removing Page from the campaign.
  - The "A record" of the Trump Organization's mail1.trump-email.com domain is deleted.
  - On or around this date, Cendyn Hospitality Marketing, the Trump Organization's email marketing firm, transfers ownership of the trump-email.com domain name to the Trump Organization after the Organization receives press inquiries about the domain name and Alfa-Bank.
- September 24: Page is formally removed from the Trump campaign. Publicly, the campaign denies all knowledge of Page.
- September 25:
  - Hicks emails Conway and Bannon instructing them to answer inquiries about Page with "[h]e was an informal advisor in March. Since then he has had no role or official contact with the campaign. We have no knowledge of activities past or present and he now officially has been removed from all lists etc."
  - When asked by CNN about allegations linking Page to Russia, Conway denies that Page is part of the Trump campaign.
  - Page sends Comey a letter asking that the FBI drop the reported investigation into his activities in Russia. He denies meeting with sanctioned Russian officials.
  - FBI informant Stefan Halper asks Trump advisor George Papadopoulos if he is aware of any efforts by Russians to interfere with the 2016 election; Papadopoulos twice denies it.
- September 26: Page tells Josh Rogin in an interview for The Washington Post that he is taking a leave of absence from the Trump campaign. He denies meeting with sanctioned individuals in Moscow.
- September 27: Ten minutes after Alfa-Bank servers made a last failed attempt to contact to Trump Organization's mail1.trump-email.com domain (which had its "A record" deleted September 23), one of the Alfa-Bank servers looks up the new domain name trump1.contact-client.com, which was routed to the same Trump server. The new domain does not appear to have been previously active and the PTR record did not include the new, alternate name. According to "Max"'s data, the Alfa-Bank server only looked up the new domain once. Spectrum Health never succeeded in relocating the Trump server through the new route.
- September 28:
  - Russian-American Simon Kukes donates $99,000 to the Trump Victory Committee, which distributes donations between Trump, the RNC, and state Republican parties. His 2016 political donations become a subject of the Mueller investigation.
  - The House and Senate leaders send a letter to the National Association of State Election Directors highlighting the "challenge of malefactors that are seeking to use cyberattacks to disrupt the administration of our elections" and urging the states to use DHS services but without any mention of Russia. The letter makes clear that DHS assistance would be free of federal interference in state and local officials running the elections.
- September 29:
  - Comey testifies before the House Judiciary Committee, confirming that federal investigators have detected suspicious activities in voter registration databases, as stated in the August 18 alert.
  - Butina meets Gordon at a party at the Swiss ambassador's residence. Gordon was the Director of National Security for the Trump campaign from February to August. That night, Paul Erickson emails Butina and Gordon offering to "add an electronic bridge" to their meeting at the party. In his email to Butina, Erickson writes that Gordon is "playing a crucial role in the Trump transition effort and would be an excellent addition to any of the U.S./Russia friendship dinners to occasionally hold." He writes that all the "right" people listen to Gordon on international security. Erickson's email to Gordon describes Butina as a "special friend" of the NRA and the special assistant to the deputy governor of the Bank of Russia.
- September 30:
  - Ksenia Baygarova interviews Papadopoulos for Interfax on Trump's foreign policy positions in relation to Russia. The interview was approved by Trump campaign deputy communications director Bryan Lanza. Baygarova later tells The Washington Post that she had been tasked to interview a representative from each campaign. She says Papadopoulos was the only person from the Trump campaign to respond. She describes him as not very experienced. Adverse publicity generated by the interview leads to Papadopoulos being fired from the campaign in October.
  - The FBI hosts a conference call with Florida elections officials and VR Systems, among others, in which they warn that Russian hackers are targeting election infrastructure. The FBI shares a list of suspicious IP addresses to watch out for.
- Late September: Lichtblau and his lawyer meet a roomful of officials at FBI HQ, and are told the officials are looking into potential Russian interference in the election. FBI officials ask Lichtblau to delay publishing his story.

=== October 2016 ===
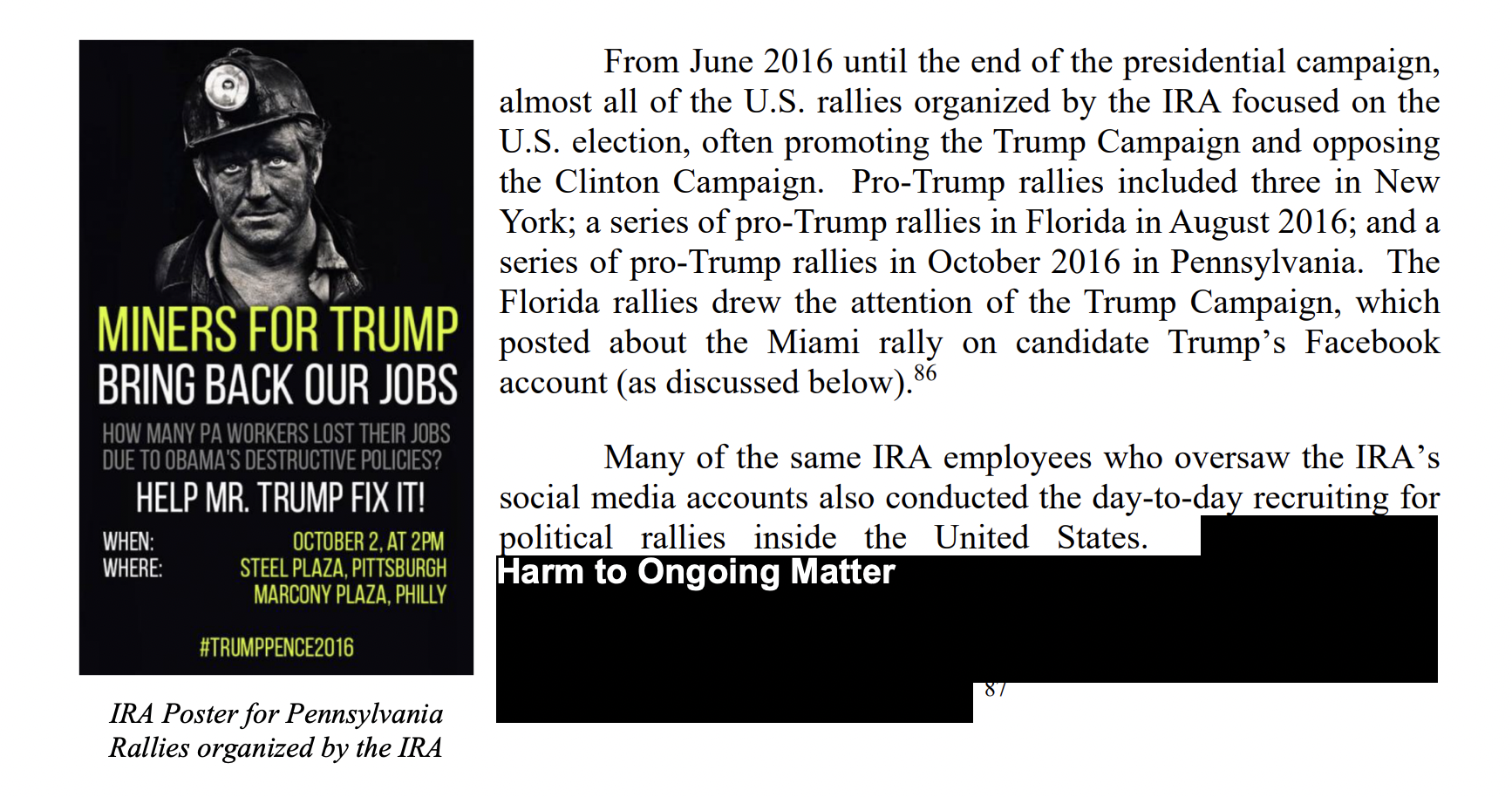
Poster and text from Mueller Report about 2016 rallies organized by Russia's Internet Research Agency

- October: The FBI Counterintelligence Division tasks a contractor with identifying Russian influence activity on Twitter.
- Early October: A team of FBI agents travel to Europe to speak with Steele about his dossier. On or about the same date, Steele gives the FBI a dossier of allegations compiled by Cody Shearer, which corresponded "with what he had separately heard from his own independent sources." It includes the unverified allegation that Trump was sexually compromised by the Russian secret service at the Ritz-Carlton Hotel in Moscow in 2013.
- October 1:
  - Credico texts Stone that there will be "big news on Wednesday," and "Hillary's campaign will die this week."
  - Stone tweets that something damaging to Clinton will happen soon.
  - DHS Secretary Johnson issues a public statement advising states to seek DHS assistance with election security, and notes that 21 states have requested help.
- October 2:
  - "Miners for Trump" rallies are held across Pennsylvania. The IRA uses the same techniques to organize the rallies as they used for the "Florida Goes Trump" rallies, including hiring a person to wear a Clinton mask and a prison uniform.
  - Stone tells Jones on InfoWars, "I'm assured the motherlode is coming Wednesday...I have reason to believe that it is devastating."
  - After a scheduled WikiLeaks press conference is postponed, Credico tells Stone the delay is a "head fake."
- October 3:
  - Stone asks Credico if Assange "back[ed] off." Credico responds that he "think[s] its on for tomorrow," and adds that "Hillary and her people" are trying to stop Assange.
  - Stone tweets that Assange will release something soon.
  - WikiLeaks sends a Twitter direct message to Trump Jr. asking him to help "push" a WikiLeaks tweet from earlier in the day ("Hillary Clinton on Assange 'Can't we just drone this guy?[']") that includes a link to truepundit.com. Trump Jr. responds, "Already did that earlier today. It's amazing what she can get away with. What's behind this Wednesday leak I keep reading about?"
  - Stone emails Prince that "[t]he payload is still coming."
- October 4:
  - Assange announces the pending release of a million documents about the U.S. presidential election. He denies any specific intent to harm Clinton.
  - Bannon asks Stone if Assange cut a deal with the Clintons. Stone replies that Assange is afraid, but will make weekly releases.
- October 5:
  - (Wednesday) Stone tweets that a payload from Assange is coming.
  - Trump Jr. retweets a WikiLeaks tweet announcing an "860Mb [sic]" archive of various Clinton campaign documents from "Guccifer 2.0".
- October 6:
  - Stone tweets, "Julian Assange will deliver a devastating expose on Hillary at a time of his choosing. I stand by my prediction."
  - The IRA posts nearly 18,000 Twitter messages at a rate of approximately 12 per minute.
- October 7:
  - Before the DHS and IDNI joint statement release, Rice summons Kislyak to her office and delivers a verbal warning for Russia not to interfere in the election. She gives Kislyak a more detailed written warning for Putin that includes potential consequences that would "powerfully impact" Russia's economy.
  - At 12:40 PM EDT, The DHS and the ODNI issue a joint statement accusing the Russian government of breaking into the computer systems of several political organizations and releasing the obtained material via DCLeaks, WikiLeaks, and "Guccifer 2.0", with the intent "to interfere with the U.S. election process."
  - Corsi holds a conference call with members of WorldNetDaily in which he warns them of the imminent release of the Access Hollywood tape and tells them "to reach Assange immediately". In November 2018 he tells Mueller's team that he thought Malloch was on the call and assumed Malloch had successfully contacted Assange because of the subsequent Podesta emails release later in the day. Travel records show Malloch was on a trans-Atlantic flight at the time. The Mueller Report says Corsi's sometimes conflicting statements about the call's contents have not been corroborated.
  - At 4:03 PM EDT, The Washington Post publishes a raw video tape from the television show Access Hollywood of Trump bragging about grabbing women by their genitals. While the tape is not relevant to the Russian interference in the election, the distraction of its release lessens the public impact of the joint intelligence report released hours earlier and may have triggered WikiLeaks' Podesta emails release 30 minutes later.
  - Around 4:30 PM EDT, WikiLeaks begins publishing thousands of Podesta emails, revealing excerpts from Clinton's paid speeches to Wall Street. Trump Jr. retweets WikiLeaks' and others' announcements about the release.
- October 8: Kushner's company receives $370 million in new loans, including $285 million from Deutsche Bank, to refinance his portion of the former New York Times building. The size and timing of the Deutsche Bank loan draws scrutiny from the House Financial Services Committee, the Justice Department, and, later, the Mueller investigation. The concern is that the transaction may be related to Russian money laundering through Deutsche Bank.
- October 8–14: The U.S. government expresses to Ecuadorian officials its concerns that Assange is using their London embassy to help Russian's interfere in the U.S. election.
- October 9: Banks, Wigmore, and Farage attend the second presidential debate in St. Louis, Missouri.
- October 10:
  - Smith emails supporters and Flynn Jr. updates on purported Clinton emails sent to WikiLeaks for validation.
  - DHS Secretary Johnson releases a public statement raising awareness of election systems security. It notes that a DHS vulnerability scan takes three weeks and there are only 29 days left before the election. The statement indicates that 33 state and 11 local or county election agencies have requested assistance from DHS.
- October 11:
  - Trump Jr. travels to Paris to give a paid speech at the Ritz Hotel. The dinner event is sponsored by the Center of Political and Foreign Affairs, a group founded by Fabien Baussart and his business partner. Baussart is openly linked to Russian government officials. Randa Kassis, one of the hosts, travels to Moscow after the election and reports the details of the event to Russian Deputy Foreign Minister Mikhail Bogdanov.
  - Podesta says he thinks the Trump campaign had advance notice of WikiLeaks' release of his emails.
- October 12: WikiLeaks writes to Trump Jr., "Hey Donald, great to see you and your dad talking about our publications" and "Strongly suggest your dad tweets this link if he mentions us wlsearch.tk." Fifteen minutes later, Donald Trump tweets, "Very little pick-up by the dishonest media of incredible information provided by WikiLeaks. So dishonest! Rigged system!"
- October 13: WikiLeaks again denies communicating with Stone. Later that day, Stone and WikiLeaks communicate by private Twitter message.
- October 14:
  - Trump Jr. tweets about wlsearch.tk as requested by WikiLeaks on October 12.
  - Pence denies that the Trump campaign is working with WikiLeaks, stating that "nothing could be further from the truth".
  - The FBI and DHS send a second "flash report" and a Joint Analysis Report warning about election systems being targeted. The reports contain a list of suspicious IP addresses but do not mention that they are associated with a state actor, so many state IT directors do not understand the urgency of the reports and do not pass them on to their election officials.
  - Around this date, Kislyak informs Rice of Putin's response to the warning she gave him on October 7. In a 2017 interview with the Senate Intelligence Committee, she characterizes the response as "denial and obfuscation" and says that Putin specifically mentioned that Russia remains a nuclear power.
- October 15:
  - The Democratic Coalition Against Trump files a complaint with the FBI against Stone for colluding with Russia. They ask the FBI to look into connections between Stone, the Trump campaign, and the hacking of Podesta's emails.
  - The National Security Division of the Justice Department acquires a FISA warrant to monitor the communications of two Russian banks as part of an investigation into whether they illegally transferred money to the Trump campaign.
  - The Ecuadorian Embassy cuts Assange's Internet access and telephone service.
  - Smith sends another update on Clinton's emails and WikiLeaks to Flynn, Flynn Jr., Ledeen, and Clovis.
- October 16: The IRA's Instagram account "Woke Blacks" makes a post aimed at suppressing black voter turnout.
- October 18:
  - Butina and Gordon attend a Styx concert together.
  - Ecuador's Ministry of Foreign Affairs releases a public statement announcing that it "exercised its right" to "temporarily restrict access to some of [WikiLeaks'] private communications network within its Embassy in the United Kingdom" and that the government of Ecuador "does not interfere in external electoral processes, nor does it favor any particular candidate".
- October 19:
  Senator Harry Reid Letter to FBI Director James B. Comey
  - The FBI and the US Department of Justice (DoJ) apply for a FISA warrant to conduct surveillance on Carter Page. In its approval, the FISA Court finds there is probable cause to believe Page is a Russian agent.
  - During the third presidential debate, Clinton blames Russia for the DNC email leaks and accuses Trump of being a "puppet" of Putin. Trump denies ever having met Putin and any connection to him. Banks, Wigmore, and Farage are in attendance.
  - A Financial Times probe finds evidence a Trump venture has links to an alleged money laundering network.
  - Stone denies having advance knowledge of WikiLeaks' release of Podesta's emails.
  - The IRA runs its most popular ad on Facebook. The ad is for the IRA's Back the Badge Facebook group and shows a badge with the words "Back the Badge" in front of police lights under the caption "Community of people who support our brave Police Officers."
  - Hours after a heated argument between Assange and Ecuadorian Ambassador Carlos Abad Ortiz the night before, two Wikileaks personnel remove computer equipment and "about 100 hard drives" from the embassy.
- October 21:
  - WikiLeaks sends Trump Jr. private tweets suggesting that the campaign give them Trump's tax returns to publish so that they seem less of a "'pro-Trump' 'pro-Russia'" source.
  - DoJ and FBI request and obtain new FISA wiretap on Carter Page.
  - Manafort emails Kushner a strategy memorandum proposing the Trump campaign portray Clinton "as the failed and corrupt champion of the establishment." He suggests using Wikileaks as a source of Clinton quotes that could be used against her.
- October 22: A large rally is held in Charlotte, North Carolina, protesting the police shooting of Keith Lamont Scott. The IRA website BlackMattersUS recruits unwitting local activists to organize the rally. BlackMattersUS provides an activist with a bank card to pay for rally expenses.
- October 24:
  - Trump announces at a Florida campaign rally, "I have nothing to do with Russia, folks. I'll give you a written statement."
  - After Smith sends another email update about WikiLeaks, Charles Johnson responds that Bannon expects Smith to hand over all 30,000 Clinton emails or face legal action. In 2020, the Senate Intelligence Committee finds that there is no evidence Smith received any non-public documents from WikiLeaks.
  - A consultant asks Benton about his contribution for the September 22 event. Benton replies that he "bought the tickets and gifted them" to Wead and Vasilenko, and that he (Benton) is the source of the funds. Benton and Wead are indicted in September 2021 for making a straw donation on behalf of Vasilenko.
- October 27: At the Valdai Discussion Club yearly forum, Putin denounces American "hysteria" over accusations of Russian interference, saying "Does anyone seriously think that Russia can influence the choice of the American people?"
- October 28:
  - The FBI reopens its Hillary Clinton email investigation after a monthlong delay during which it focused on investigating the Trump campaign's connections to Russia, according to the report of the Justice Department's inspector general. A key influence on the decision was a probably fake Russian intelligence document discussing a purported email from Attorney General Loretta E. Lynch to Clinton campaign staffer Amanda Renteria in which she promises to go easy on Clinton. Nine days after announcing he was reopening the probe, Comey said the FBI found nothing to change its July decision against bringing charges.
  - Peter W. Smith sends an email to an undisclosed list of recipients in which he writes that there is a "tug-of-war going on within WikiLeaks over its planned releases in the next few days" and that WikiLeaks "has maintained that it will save its best revelations for last, under the theory this allows little time for response prior to the U.S. election November 8." An attachment to the email says that WikiLeaks will release "All 33k deleted Emails" by November 1.
- October 29: Trump loans $10 million to his campaign It is his largest single contribution to his campaign, and the campaign never reimburses him for the loan. Starting in 2017, Mueller's team and, later, federal prosecutors investigate whether the funds came from a state-owned Egyptian bank, finally dropping the case in Summer 2020 without reaching a conclusion.
- October 30:
  - Senate Minority Leader Harry Reid sends FBI Director James Comey a letter asking him to reveal Trump's ties to the Russian Federation.
  - Giorgi Rtskhiladze reports to Michael Cohen that he had successfully "Stopped flow of some tapes from Russia but not sure if there's anything else. Just so u know. ..." Rtskhiladze later October 10, 2018) changed his previous (April 4, 2018) testimony to Mueller by claiming that the "tapes were fake", but District Judge Christopher R. Cooper cast doubt on that claim. He said Rtskhiladze "undercut" his claim by speaking as if getting recorded was a real consequence of indiscretions committed around Agalarov/Crocus, and because Rtskhiladze's own words indicated "that the tapes may have been real".
- October 31:
  - Through the "red phone", Obama tells Putin to stop interfering or face consequences.
  - Mother Jones magazine's David Corn reports that a veteran spy, later publicly identified as Steele, gave the FBI information alleging a Russian operation to cultivate Trump, later known as the "Steele dossier".
  - Slate publishes an article by Franklin Foer alleging that a Trump server was in suspicious contact with Alfa-Bank in Russia. Snopes examined the story and rated it "Unproven". Several cyber security experts saw nothing nefarious, while the FBI was still investigating the matter: "One U.S. official said investigators find the server relationship 'odd' and are not ignoring it. But the official said there is still more work for the FBI to do. Investigators have not yet determined whether a connection would be significant."
  - The New York Times publishes an article by Lichtblau and Steven Lee Myers with a headline that seems to exonerate the Trump campaign, but withholds some information.
  - The GRU targets over 120 Florida election officials' email accounts with spearphishing attacks. They receive emails purportedly from VR Systems, the state's voter registration and election results service provider, asking them to open a purported Word document containing a trojan. At least some of the emails from address VR Systems does not use, contain British spellings. Many of the emails are flagged by spam filters. Elections officials in Washington County and another county open the attachments and infect their systems. Later, the FBI believes one county government's network was compromised in a way that would have given security hackers the ability to alter voter registration data, but this is disputed by state election officials.

=== November 2016 ===
- November–December: Michael Flynn serves as an advisor to SCL Group, the parent company of Cambridge Analytica. The agreement was broken shortly after the election.
- November:
  - Mangiante quits the London Centre of International Law Practice after complaining to Mifsud about not being paid her salary.
  - Paul Manafort and Rick Gates falsely assert in writing to the Justice Department that their work for the Ukrainian government did not require registering as foreign agents in the United States. In September 2018, Manafort pleads guilty to lying to the Justice Department about the extent of his work for Ukraine.
- November 1:
  - Florida elections officials receive an email from VR's chief operating officer warning them about the malicious emails sent the day before. The company notifies the FBI of the spearphishing attack, but does not tell customers or the FBI about the attempted August attack.
  - Twitter accounts belonging to the GRU persona "Anonymous Poland" post a forged letter on Bradley Foundation stationery showing that the conservative foundation purportedly donated $150 million to the Clinton campaign, which would be illegal if true.
- November 2: The IRA second Twitter account alleges "#VoterFraud by counting tens of thousands of ineligible mail in Hillary votes being reported in Broward County, Florida." Trump Jr. retweets it.
- November 3: The IRA Instagram account "Blacktivist" suggests people vote for Stein instead of Clinton.
- November 4:
  - Mother Jones reports that an October security sweep of the DNC offices in Washington, D.C., discovered a signal that may have belonged to a device outside the office that could intercept cell phone calls. The DNC says details of the security sweep were passed on to the FBI and "another agency with three letters," but no device was ever found.
  - Assistant Secretary of State for European and Eurasian Affairs Victoria Nuland rejects a formal request from the Russian Embassy to observe U.S. elections because Russia refused an invitation to participate in the official OSCE observer mission.
- November 5:
  - Konstantin Sidorkov again emails Trump Jr. and Trump campaign social media director Dan Scavino. He again offers to promote Trump to VK's 100 million users. His previous email was sent on January 19, 2016.
  - Anti-Clinton "Texit" rallies are held across Texas. The IRA's "Heart of Texas" Facebook group organizes the rallies around the theme of Texas seceding from the United States if Clinton is elected. The group contacts the Texas Nationalist Movement, a secessionist organization, to help with organizing efforts, but they decline to help. Small rallies are held in Dallas, Fort Worth, Austin, and other cities. No one attends the Lubbock rally.
  - Manafort emails Kushner a warning that if Clinton loses, her campaign will respond to the loss by claiming voter fraud, cyber-fraud, and Russian hacking of voting machines contributed to Trump's victory.
- November 8:
  - Trump is elected President of the United States.
  - Hours after the polls close, the hashtag #Calexit is retweeted by thousands of IRA accounts.
  - Rospatent, the Russian government agency responsible for intellectual property, grants 10-year extensions on four of Trump's trademarks.

== Investigations' continuing timelines ==
- Timeline of investigations into Donald Trump and Russia (January–June 2017)
- Timeline of investigations into Donald Trump and Russia (July–December 2017)
- Timeline of investigations into Donald Trump and Russia (January–June 2018)
- Timeline of investigations into Donald Trump and Russia (July–December 2018)
- Timeline of investigations into Donald Trump and Russia (January–June 2019)
- Timeline of investigations into Donald Trump and Russia (July–December 2019)
- Timeline of investigations into Donald Trump and Russia (2020–2022)

== Related continuing interference ==
- Russian interference in the 2018 United States elections
- Russian interference in the 2020 United States elections
- Russian interference in the 2024 United States elections

== See also ==
- Timelines related to Donald Trump and Russian interference in United States elections
