= VR Systems =

US elections technology systems company

VR Systems is a provider of elections technology systems and software. VR Systems is based in Tallahassee, Florida. The company's products are used in elections in eight U.S. states. The company was founded in 1992 by Jane and David Watson. The CEO and President is Mindy Perkins.

== History ==
VR Systems was founded in Florida in 1992 and grew its voter registration system, VoterFocus, in the years following the passage of the Help America Vote Act in 2002. In 2004, in response to devastation caused by Hurricane Charley in South Florida, VR created the EViD electronic pollbook designed to check in voters at central locations as many of the precincts in the area had been destroyed. VR Systems attends the United States Department of Homeland Security executive committee and initiates a cybersecurity communications education program, revealing their working process with election administrators nationwide. Today, most counties in Florida use VR products. In 2010, VR became a 100% employee-owned company.

=== Russian hacking controversy ===
VR Systems Phishing Alert to Mecklenburg County

VR Systems was reportedly targeted by operatives of the Russian Main Intelligence Directorate (GRU) in and around August 2016. Russian actors also attempted to impersonate VR Systems by creating a false email address as part of a spear phishing campaign targeting state electoral officials. There are no reports that the spear phishing campaign was successful. VR Systems insisted that none of its employees fell for the Russian phishing scam and that none of its systems were hacked. The investigation by North Carolina has been proved inconclusive.

==== Timeline of Russian hacking controversy ====
- On August 24, 2016, Russian hackers sent phishing emails to VR Systems.
- On August 30, VR Systems experienced an election-reporting mishap during the state primary in Broward County, Florida, when preliminary vote totals were posted live before the election ended.
- On September 30, the Federal Bureau of Investigation (FBI) held a conference call with Florida election officials warning them to look out for suspicious activity coming from specific IP addresses. VR Systems, which is on the call, discovers activity from the IP addresses and notifies the FBI. On October 31, Russian hackers sent spear-phishing emails from a fake email account to more than 120 election officials in Florida, North Carolina, and other states. If opened, the documents attached to the email would invisibly download a malware package that could have provided the attacker with remote control over a target’s computer. VR Systems immediately alerted its clients and notified the FBI, but the company could not fully estimate the scope of the attack.
- On Election Day, November 8, Durham County, North Carolina, experienced problems with its VR Systems poll book software in five precincts. State officials immediately ordered Durham County to abandon the laptops in favor of paper printouts of the voter list to check in voters. However, the switch caused extensive delays at some precincts, leading an unknown number of voters to leave without casting ballots.

== Products ==
VR Systems offers the EViD electronic pollbook, Voter Focus voter registration software, ELM online training and website services specifically designed for the elections community.

=== EViD electronic pollbook ===
The EViD electronic pollbook, short for Electronic Voter Identification, is available as a tablet, an all-in-one station or customized for an existing device. More than 14,000 EViDs were in use during the 2016 elections in eight U.S. states: California, Florida, Illinois, Indiana, North Carolina, New York, Virginia, and West Virginia. It was used in 23 of North Carolina’s 100 counties and in 64 of Florida’s 67 counties. The latter include Miami-Dade, the state’s most populous county. It is proceeded with four steps: 1. Plug in the activator, connect to any network wired or wireless. 2. Voters sign for their ballot at an EViD terminal and receives ballot ticket. 3. The voters take their ballot ticket to get their ballot. The custom ballot is printed through the DirectPrint printing option. 4. Voting data is processed automatically and device could be packed up.

=== Voter Focus ===
Voter Focus is an elections management solution before, during, and after election day. This solution organizes the election cycle, including voter registration, mail ballot delivery, precinct look-up, poll worker management, candidate requests. Voter Focus comes automatically with software updates, compliance updates and extensive built-in Q&A capabilities.

=== ELM ===
ELM is an online elections training platform designed specifically for election worker training. Each jurisdiction can create custom training by reusing existing media content or content from the ELM collaborative library.

=== VR Tower ===
VR Tower is designed for elections officials who would like a complete website solution with maintenance tools. The websites specifies in politician-voter communication.
