= Simon Kukes =

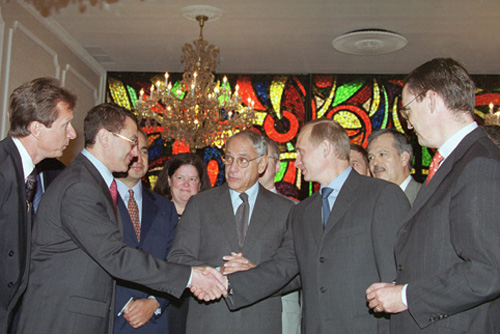
- Kukes shaking hands with Putin in 2000
- Born: 1946 (age 78–79)
- Occupations: oil business manager, consultant
- Title: Chief Executive

Simon Gregory Kukes (Russian: Семен Григорьевич Кукес; born 5 December 1946) is a Russian-born American chemist and retired oil industry businessman. He immigrated to the US to work in the oil industry in the late 1970s, and returned to Russia with Amoco in 1995. He became vice president at Yukos, president of TNK-BP from 1998 until 2003, and returned to head Yukos, replacing Mikhail Khodorkovsky. Officially retired he is still consulting in the oil businesses.

Holding various positions over the years, Kukes has served as the principal of his personal investment company, SK Energy, since April 2013. He is the CEO and Director of PEDEVCO Corp.

His commitment to the oil and gas industry has inspired Dr. Simon Kukes to publish more than 60 scientific papers and two books on the oil and gas industry of Russia and the United States. He is also the holder of more than 130 patents, primarily in Oil and Petrochemical Processing.

== Early life and education ==
Simon Kukes was born in Moscow to Jewish parents. He studied at Mendeleev Moscow Chemical & Technological Institute and at Nesmeyanov Institute of Hetero-Organic Compounds for his postgraduate studies.

Kukes attended several prestigious universities all over the globe, receiving his Bachelor of Science in Chemical Engineering from the D. Mendeleev University of Chemical Technology of Russia, where he graduated with Honors.

From there, he pursued his PhD in Physical Chemistry at the Russian Academy of Sciences, where he would later be a Research Associate for Nuclear and Electronic Resonance.

Kukes then attended Rice University in Houston, Texas where he was a Postdoctoral Fellow.

== Career ==
Kukes immigrated to the US in the late seventies, and became an American citizen, giving up his Russian passport. He briefly taught at Rice University, in Houston, Texas. From 1979 to 1987, he was the Technical Director of oil-refining and petro-chemistry for Phillips Petroleum and in 1987 became Vice-President over marketing and business development for Amoco. In 1995, he became vice president of its Moscow Office. From 1996 to 1998, he was vice president at Yukos. He was also the President and Chief Executive of Tyumen Oil Company (TNK) from 1998 until it combined with British Petroleum in 2003 to create TNK-BP.

In 1999, the Wall Street Journal voted Kukes as one of the Top 10 Central European Executives. He is also the recipient of the Medal of the Ministry for Natural Resources of the Russian Federation, as well as the American Society of Competition Development Award for Leadership. In 2003, he was named by The Financial Times and PricewaterhouseCoopers as one of the 64 most respected business leaders in the world.

In November 2003, he was elected to replace Mikhail Khodorkovsky as the head of Yukos.

In June 2004, he became co-owner of the Russian oil company ZAO Samara-Nafta, a subsidiary of Lukoil. As of 2005, Kukes owned 8 percent in Amarin Corporation, then a neurology drug developer. He also was a partner at Hess Corporation, a New York-based oil and gas company.

As of 2016, he is a consultant for oil businesses in the US and Russia, as well as Leverate, a FinTech company for foreign exchange brokers.

From January 2005 to April 2013, Kukes was the CEO at Samara-Nafta, a Russian oil company that partnered with US-based international oil company, Hess Corporation.

Following his time at TNK, Kukes joined Yukos Oil Company in Moscow presiding as the CEO and Chairman.

In 2019, Kukes invested in an Israeli company, GLAMZ, a platform connecting customers to local beauty service providers.

== Mueller report ==
In September 2017, Kukes was reportedly being investigated by the Mueller special counsel investigation for alleged ties to Viktor Vekselberg.

== Personal life ==
In 2000, Kukes bought a four-room condominium in Trump Parc in Manhattan.
