= Timeline of investigations into Donald Trump and Russia (July–December 2019) =

This is a timeline of major events in second half of 2019 related to the investigations into the myriad links between Trump associates and Russian officials that are suspected of being inappropriate, relating to the Russian interference in the 2016 United States elections. It follows the timeline of Russian interference in the 2016 United States elections before and after July 2016 up until election day November 8, and the transition, the first and second halves of 2017, the first and second halves of 2018, and the first half of 2019, but precedes that of 2020 and 2021.

These events are related to, but distinct from, Russian interference in the 2020 United States elections.

== July–December 2019 ==
=== July ===
- July 1: Judge Friedrich rules that the Mueller Report and government public statements about it violate a standing court rule against prejudicial public statements and could unfairly prejudice a jury in the Concord Management and Consulting case, but also says that time will cure the injury. He issues an order limiting further government public statements about the case.
- July 2: Kogan drops his March 15 defamation suit against Facebook in order to avoid the high costs of lengthy litigation.
- July 8: The White House blocks former chief of staff to ex-White House counsel McGahn Annie Donaldson, whose contemporaneous notes are cited 65 times in the Mueller report, from answering 212 questions about potential obstruction of justice by Trump.
- July 9: It is reported the DoJ is attempting to discourage Aaron Zebley and James L. Quarles, two of Robert Mueller's deputies, from testifying before Congress.
- July 11: The House Judiciary Committee is scheduled to vote on authorizing subpoenas for 12 of Robert Mueller's witnesses; including Kushner, Sessions, Rosenstein, Flynn, Kelly, Lewandowski, as well as Dylan Howard and David Pecker, two executives at American Media, Inc., and Keith Davidson, an attorney who previously represented Stormy Daniels.
- July 12: The FTC fines Facebook $5 billion for mishandling users' personal information, including missteps involving Cambridge Analytica.
- July 15:
  - The trial of Bijan Kian, Flynn's business partner, begins in federal court in Alexandria, Virginia. Kian is accused of acting as an unregistered agent of the Turkish government while a member of the Trump transition team.
  - The Senate Intelligence Committee interviews FBI special agent in charge at the Mueller investigation David Archey.
- July 16:
  - Former Ecuadorian President Rafael Correa tells CNN that his government knew in 2016, that Assange was interfering in the U.S. election.
  - The Ukrainian Sixth Administrative Court of Appeals overturns the December 12, 2018 ruling by the Kyiv Administrative District Court, that National Anti-Corruption Bureau director Artem Sytnyk and member of the Ukrainian Parliament Serhiy Leshchenko acted illegally when they revealed that Manafort's name and signature were in Yanukovych's "black ledger".
- July 18: ABC News reports that the Trump administration is again invoking executive privilege to block intelligence committees from seeing classified Mueller documents.
- July 21: On Fox News Sunday, Chairman Nadler says: "The [Mueller] report presents very substantial evidence that the president is guilty of high crimes and misdemeanors ..."
- July 22: In a phone call, Giuliani and Volker pressure Ukrainian President Zalensky adviser Andriy Yermak to get Zelenskyy to announce investigations into claims that Ukraine interfered in the U.S. 2016 presidential election to hurt Trump, as well as corruption claims involving Joe Biden.
- July 23: Kian is found guilty of illegally lobbying for Turkey and conspiring with Flynn and Alptekin to cover up his activities. Federal Judge Anthony J. Trenga announces he will rule on September 5 whether he will throw out the convictions for lack of evidence. Sentencing is set for October 18.
- July 24:
  - Mueller testifies before the House Intelligence and Judiciary Committees. Mueller reiterated his concern over foreign interference in U.S. elections, which he considered a serious threat.
  - Senate Republican Cindy Hyde-Smith blocks two election security bills and a cybersecurity measure.
  - Mitch McConnell blocks the two election security measures.

Senate Intelligence Committee report on Russian Active Measures Campaigns and Interference in the 2016 U.S. Election Volume 1

A memorandum with a non-verbatim record of the call between Trump and Zelenskyy released by the White House. As such, it is not a transcript of the call.

- July 25:
  - House Oversight and Reform Committee votes to subpoena senior White House officials' communications via private email accounts and messaging applications.
  - Senate Intelligence report on Russian interference in the 2016 election made public. The report found the Russian government directed extensive activity, beginning in at least 2014 and carrying into at least 2017, against U.S. election infrastructure at the state and local level. The report recommends additional funding through Congress for states to improve election security once the $380 million appropriated in 2018 is spent.
  - Trump calls President of Ukraine Volodymyr Zelenskyy, which later in September sparks the Trump–Ukraine scandal. Vice President Mike Pence's representative Keith Kellogg, and US Secretary of State Mike Pompeo were on the call. Approximately 90 minutes after Trump's call, senior budget official Michael Duffey tells Pentagon officials that Trump is personally interested in the Ukraine aid and has ordered the hold himself.
  - In the phone call, Trump asks Zelenskyy to investigate CrowdStrike, the company that investigated the 2016 DNC server break-in by the GRU, and makes reference to a server allegedly located in Ukraine. He tells Zelenskyy to contact Barr for more details. This is widely interpreted by the press as a reference to debunked conspiracy theories propagated by Russian media and Roger Stone, among others, that say the reason the DNC didn't give the server to the FBI for analysis is because it is located in Ukraine. The same conspiracy theories also claim the company is owned by a wealthy Ukrainian.
- July 26:
  - Senate Intelligence Committee's new report on election interference concluded Russia probably targeted the election systems in all 50 states in the 2016 elections.
  - House Judiciary Committee asks judge Beryl Howell to unseal Mueller's secret grand jury evidence.
  - Trump calls Boris Johnson to congratulate him on becoming the new Prime Minister of the United Kingdom. On the call, he asks Johnson to help him discredit the Mueller investigation.
- July 30: U.S. District Judge John Koeltl dismisses the DNC's April 20, 2018, lawsuit accusing the Trump campaign and WikiLeaks of working with Russia to disseminate stolen DNC documents. Judge Koeltl said the dissemination was protected by the First Amendment because they were not involved in stealing the material. The DNC suit alleged that only Russia was involved in the theft.

=== August ===
- August 2: Giuliani meets with Zelenskyy aide Andrey Yermak in Madrid to discuss the investigations of Zlochevsky and of Ukrainian interference in the 2016 election that Trump wants the Ukrainian government to pursue.
- August 6:
  - Judge Jackson dismisses one of the charges against Gregory Craig. She writes that there is ambiguity over whether the FARA statute applies to a document Craig wrote in 2013 that contains materially false information.
  - Strzok files suit against the FBI and the DOJ over his firing. His complaint asserts that he was denied due process under the 5th amendment because he wasn't given the opportunity to appeal his discharge, and that the release of his text messages violated the Privacy Act. The complaint argues that his firing was politically motivated because it ignored a recommendation from the Office of Professional Responsibility that he be demoted or suspended without pay for 60 days.
- August 7:
  - House Judiciary Committee sues McGahn to testify before Congress, claiming he is the "most important witness, other than the president," regarding their investigation into possible obstruction of justice by Trump.
  - McCabe files suit against the FBI and the Justice Department over his firing. His complaint asserts that he was illegally demoted and fired as part of a plan by Trump to remove people who are not loyal to him.
- August 8:
  - Per the request for House Financial Services and the House Intelligence Committees; Bank of America, Citigroup, Deutsche Bank AG, JPMorgan Chase, Morgan Stanley, and Wells Fargo turn over documents relating to Russians who may have had dealings with the Trump Organization, and/or Trump and his family. Some of the banks also turned over documents to New York state investigators.
  - For the first time publicly, Nadler states the panel is conducting an impeachment inquiry into Trump.
  - The FBI releases its 302 reports on interviews with Bruce Ohr. The interviews were conducted from November 21, 2016, through May 15, 2017.

A redacted version of the whistleblower complaint

- August 12: A whistleblower in the U.S. intelligence community files a complaint alleging "the President of the United States is using the power of his office to solicit interference from a foreign country in the 2020 U.S. election."
- August 13: Around this date, US ambassador to the European Union Gordon D. Sondland and U.S. State Department special envoy to Ukraine Kurt D. Volker work on drafting a statement for the Ukrainian president that commits Ukraine to investigating Hunter Biden and interference by Ukrainians in the 2016 U.S. election. Giuliani and a top aide to the Ukrainian president are aware of the statement. The Ukrainian government never releases the statement, and it is unclear whether they received it.
- August 15:
  - The House Judiciary Committee issues subpoenas to Lewandowski and Rick Dearborn to testify before the committee on September 17. It is reported Trump is considering invoking executive privilege again, despite Lewandowski having never worked in the White House.
  - Gregory B. Craig's trial begins in the United States District Court for the District of Columbia. He is accused of lying to federal investigators about the work Skadden performed for Manafort and Viktor Yanukovych.
- August 22: Giuliani confirms the State Department assisted his efforts in pressing the government of Ukraine to probe Democratic opponents of president Trump, regarding Manafort information release.
- August 26: The House Judiciary Committee subpoenas Rob Porter.
- August 27: Intelligence Community Inspector General Michael Atkinson summarizes the whistleblower complaint to Paul B. Murphy, Wray's chief of staff at the FBI.

=== September ===
- September 4:
  - Craig is acquitted on all counts.
  - Atkins sends deputy assistant director of the FBI Stacey Moy a criminal referral alleging Trump committed crimes related to the July 25 Ukraine phone call.
  - Nunes files a racketeering lawsuit in the U.S. District Court for the Eastern District of Virginia against the Campaign for Accountability and Glen Simpson. The suit claims that they conspired to ruin his reputation by filing an ethics complaint against him in retaliation for his work on the House Intelligence Committee in which he impugned the integrity of Simpson's firm, Fusion GPS.
- September 9:
  - The House Judiciary committee releases formal parameters of its impeachment investigation.
  - It is reported the House Intelligence committee is accusing Flynn of failing to comply with its subpoena.
  - It is reported the House Intelligence, Oversight and Foreign Affairs committees are investigating reported efforts by Trump and Giuliani "to pressure the government of Ukraine to assist" Trump's re-election campaign.
  - It is reported a former senior Russian official, who was a top CIA asset, and was instrumental to the agency's conclusion that Putin orchestrated the interference in the 2016 presidential election, was extracted from inside Russia in 2017, due to concern over Trump's disclosures of classified information, possibly endangering the asset.
- September 11: The House Judiciary Committee approves a resolution defining the rules for its impeachment investigation into Trump.
- September 12:
  - Judge Trenga considers ruling on Kian's convictions for lack of evidence.
  - Funding was released to Ukraine. See Trump–Ukraine scandal.
- September 17:
  - Trump orders Dearborn and Rob Porter not to testify at a House Judiciary Committee hearing about Trump's possible obstruction of justice.
  - Lewandowski refuses to answer dozens of questions about potential obstruction of justice during the House Judiciary Committee hearing "Presidential Obstruction of Justice and Abuse of Power."
- September 18: The House Intelligence committee has demanded Flynn provide requested documents by this date.
- September 19:
  - After repeatedly blocking Democratic efforts to bring election security legislation to the floor, including a measure that would have authorized funding to update voting equipment, McConnell says he will now back a measure to provide states with an additional $250 million in election security funding.
  - Giuliani tells Chris Cuomo on CNN's Cuomo Prime Time that he asked the Ukrainian government to investigate Ukrainian interference in the 2016 election to benefit Clinton. He denies asking Ukraine to investigate Hunter Biden, then admits doing so after further questioning.
- September 20: It is reported Trump pressured the President of Ukraine eight times to investigate Hunter Biden.
- September 23:
  - Flynn's lawyer Powell informs the House Intelligence Committee that Flynn will invoke his Fifth Amendment rights instead of testifying before the committee. She writes, Flynn "will not appear before your committee on September 25, 2019 to be paraded, harassed or disparaged for doing so."
  - Bolton tells House Foreign Affairs Committee Chairman Eliot Engel in a phone call that he should "look into the recall of Ambassador Marie Yovanovitch." Later, Engel informs his colleagues on the Oversight, Intelligence, and Foreign Affairs Committees of the conversation.
- September 24:
  - Judge Trenga overturns the jury verdict against Kian. He rules that there was insufficient evidence to support a guilty verdict. On March 18, 2021, a three-judge panel of the U.S. 4th Circuit Court of Appeals reinstates the conviction.
  - Speaker Pelosi announces the initiation of formal impeachment proceedings by the U.S. House of Representatives against President Trump.
- September 25:
  - The House Intelligence committee has demanded Flynn appear to testify this day, prior to September 23 pleading the Fifth.
  - It is reported Trump urged President Zelenskyy to "do us a favor" and "look into" potential corruption by Trump's political opponent's son per the White House readout of the July 25 call.
  - Trump responds to an AP reporter at a press conference at the U.N. that he believes Clinton's "missing" emails could be in Ukraine.
  - The White House releases a "rough transcript" of the July 25 Trump–Zelenskyy phone call.
- September 26:
  - Acting Director of National Intelligence Joseph Maguire testifies before the House Intelligence Committee about why he blocked the whistleblower complaint from being delivered to Congress.
  - The House Intelligence Committee releases an unclassified version of the whistleblower complaint.
- September 27:
  The NRA & Russia - How a Tax-Exempt Organization Became a Foreign Asset
  - The Democratic minority of the Senate Finance Committee releases a report which finds that the National Rifle Association of America (NRA) acted as a "foreign asset" to Russia ahead of 2016 election. The report presents detailed evidence of NRA officials' interactions with Russian nationals that bring into question the tax-exempt status of the NRA, including many details of the December 2015 Moscow trip that internal documents show was an official NRA function despite subsequent public denials.
  - House Democrats decide on a strategy to narrow the impeachment inquiry to focus on Donald Trump's phone call with Ukraine's president Volodymyr Zelenskyy. Three House committees (Intelligence, Oversight and Foreign Affairs) issue subpoenas to Secretary of State Mike Pompeo and five other State Department officials to produce documents relating to the Ukraine phone call.
  - Senators Grassley and Ron Jonson send a letter to the Justice Department as a followup to Grassley's July 20, 2017, letter calling for an investigation into alleged coordination between Alexandra Chalupa and the Ukrainian government to interfere in the 2016 election. They again cite the January 11, 2017 Politico report on alleged Ukrainian interference as evidence.
  - Barr and Durham have at least two meetings with Italian intelligence officials in Rome. They are shown evidence on Mifsud and listen to a recording of him being deposed when he reportedly applied for police protection. Public records show Mifsud gave a deposition to justify his application for police protection after he left Link Campus University, but after Barr and Durham's meetings, two intelligence sources tell ANSA that Mifsud did not apply for police protection.
- September 29: El País reports that Undercover Global S. L. owner David Morales, whose company provides security for the Ecuadorian embassy in London, spied on Assange for the CIA, including handing over audio and video of Assange's meetings at the embassy.
- September 30:
  - The House Oversight Committee issue a subpoena to Trump's personal attorney, Rudy Giuliani, as well as to three of Giuliani's associates, for documents relating to the Ukraine call.
  - It is reported Trump may have lied to Mueller about his knowledge of his campaign's contacts with WikiLeaks, citing the grand jury redactions in the Mueller Report.

=== October ===
- October 1:
  - Washington, DC federal judge orders the DoJ to produce 500 pages of memos documenting what witnesses told Mueller's office and the FBI during their investigation, requiring the DoJ to produce their first set of documents by November 1.
  - Italian newspaper il Foglio publishes a photo of Mifsud in Switzerland with a copy of the Swiss newspaper Zürichsee-Zeitung dated May 21, 2018, as proof that he is still alive. Mifsud has not been seen since October 2017.
  - Pompeo informs the chairmen of the House Foreign Affairs, Intelligence, and Oversight and Reform committees that the five State Department officials scheduled to be deposed in the House impeachment inquiry over the next two weeks will not appear. He characterizes the depositions as "an attempt to intimidate, bully, and treat improperly, the distinguished professionals of the Department of State."
- October 2:
  - Senator Graham sends an official letter to Prime Ministers Scott Morrison of Australia, Giuseppe Conte of Italy, and Boris Johnson of the U.K. asking them to assist Barr in his investigation of the Steele dossier, Mifsud, and Australian diplomat Alexander Downer. Australian ambassador to the U.S. Joe Hockey responds that his government already offered assistance to Barr in May and strongly rejects Graham's characterization of Downer as working for the FBI to spy on Papadopoulos.
  - State Department Inspector General Steve Linick delivers a "packet of propaganda and disinformation" to House impeachment investigators promoting conspiracy theories about former U.S. ambassador to Ukraine Marie Yovanovich. The State Department received the packet in the Spring, allegedly from the White House. Giuliani tells CNN that he is the source of the material.
- October 3: House impeachment investigators depose Volker. He tells the investigators that he warned Giuliani that Ukrainian claims about Bidens' alleged misconduct were not credible.
- October 4:
  - Pompeo misses the deadline for providing documents to the House impeachment inquiry. At a press conference with the foreign minister of Greece, he tells reporters that he sent a letter as "our initial response to the document request. We’ll obviously do all the things we’re required to do by law."
  - House impeachment investigators depose Intelligence Community Inspector General Michael Atkinson.
- October 7:
  - U.S. SDNY Federal Judge Victor Marrero rules that the President is not immune from investigation and prosecution by state prosecutors while in office regardless of any legal opinions by the Justice Department. Marrero calls Trump's argument "repugnant to the nation’s governmental structure and constitutional values." This is considered to be the first ruling on the Justice Department memos that claim the President is immune from prosecution while in office.
  - Deputy Assistant Secretary of State George P. Kent fails to appear for his scheduled voluntary deposition with the House impeachment investigators.
  - John Dowd, in is capacity as legal counsel for Lev Parnas and Igor Fruman, tells the Miami Herald that his clients will ignore House subpoenas for documents and skip their scheduled voluntary depositions with House impeachment investigators.

Senate Intelligence Committee report on Russian Active Measures Campaigns and Interference in the 2016 U.S. Election Volume 2

- October 8:
  - The Senate Intelligence Committee releases volume two of its report on Russian interference in the 2016 U.S. elections. The report finds that the majority of the IRA's social media postings targeted African-Americans.
  - Cipollone sends a letter to Speaker Pelosi, Chairman Schiff, Chairman Cummings, and Chairman Eliot Engel informing them that the White House will not cooperate with the House impeachment inquiry.
  - The White House blocks Sondland's voluntary deposition with House impeachment investigators hours before the scheduled time.
  - State Department counselor T. Ulrich Brechbuhl fails to appear for his voluntary deposition with House impeachment investigators.
- October 9: Parnas and Fruman are arrested at Dulles International Airport holding one-way tickets to Frankfurt on Lufthansa Airlines.
- October 10:
  - The Washington Post reports that former Italian prime minister Matteo Renzi and Link Campus University are both suing Papadopoulos for libel because of his public statements accusing Renzi and the university of helping Obama orchestrate Mifsud's activities. Renzi is asking for $1 million.
  - Federal prosecutors unseal an indictment accusing Parnas, Fruman, David Correia, and Andrey Kukushkin of violating campaign finance laws in 2018 to funnel money from a Russian national to political action committees (PACs) and campaigns supporting Trump, West Virginia Attorney General Patrick Morrisey, and state and federal candidates in Nevada, New York, and other states. The indictment alleges a contribution to one Congressman was made in exchange for pressure to remove Ambassador Yovanovitch from her post in Ukraine. In the indictment, Yovanovitch is identified as "Ambassador", Nevada gubernatorial candidate Adam Lexalt as "Candidate-1", Nevada state attorney general candidate Wes Duncan as "Candidate-2", Trump's main super-PAC America First Action as "Committee-1", Morissey's PAC 35th Inc. as "Committee-2", House Minority Leader Kevin McCarthy's joint fundraising committee Protect the House as "Committee-3", and U.S. Representative Pete Sessions as "Congressman-1".
  - Parnas misses his voluntary deposition with House impeachment investigators.
  - The White House tells Yovanovitch not to appear for her House deposition.
  - Career diplomat Michael McKinley resigns from the State Department over Trump's attacks on Yovanovitch. His latest position was senior advisor to Secretary of State Pompeo.
- October 11:
  - House impeachment investigators depose Marie Yovanovitch.
  - Trump repeats his assertion that because he is president, he cannot be investigated by any prosecutor.
  - Fruman skips his voluntary deposition with House impeachment investigators.
- October 14:
  - House impeachment investigators cancel Giuliani associate Semyon Kislin's scheduled deposition after he reaches a cooperation agreement with the House Intelligence Committee.
  - Sondland misses the deadline for providing subpoenaed documents to House impeachment investigators. His attorneys say he us unable to produce the documents without permission from the State Department.
  - House impeachment investigators depose former National Security Council official Fiona Hill.
- October 15:
  - Deadline for Giuliani to comply with House Oversight Committee subpoena, passes with Giuliani stating he won't comply with a congressional subpoena.
  - Pence says he will not comply with a document request regarding Trump's July 25 call with Zelenskyy from House impeachment investigators.
  - The Office of Management and Budget (OMB) states it won't comply with a congressional subpoena over documents, which were requested October 7, about withholding military aid to Ukraine. The acting budget director Russell Vought refuses to testify on October 25.
  - House impeachment investigators depose senior State Department official George Kent.
- October 16: House impeachment investigators depose McKinley.
- October 17:
  - Acting White House chief of staff Mick Mulvaney tells reporters at a White House press conference that Trump withheld $400 million of military aid to Ukraine in order to force them to investigate "corruption related to the DNC server." He defends the move as "absolutely appropriate."
  - House impeachment investigators depose Sondland.
  - House Oversight and Reform Committee Chairman Elijah Cummings dies from "complications concerning longstanding health challenges." He chaired one of the three House committees conducting the impeachment inquiry.
- October 18:
  - Kian is scheduled for sentencing, prior to September 24 overturning.
  - Assistant Secretary of Energy Melissa F. Burnison informs House impeachment investigators that the Department of Energy will not produce the documents subpoenaed from Secretary Rick Perry, citing Cipollone's October 8 letter calling the subpoenas invalid.
- October 21: House impeachment investigators postpone the depositions scheduled for October 24–25 because of a scheduling conflict with Congressman Cumming's memorial services.
- October 22: House impeachment investigators depose William B. Taylor Jr.
- October 23:
  - House Republicans barge into the secure room in the basement of the Capitol building used by the House committees conducting the impeachment inquiry to depose witnesses. They refuse to leave for five hours as they protest the deposition process. There presence violates House rules because they bring electronic devices into a room secured for discussing highly sensitive or classified information.
  - House impeachment investigators depose deputy assistant secretary of defense for Russia, Ukraine and Eurasia Laura Cooper after the unauthorized Republican protesters clear out of the secure room.
- October 25:
  - Butina is released from federal prison in Florida and deported to Russia.
  - Judge Howell orders the Justice Department to hand over to the House Judiciary Committee all of the grand jury materials referenced in the Mueller report, as well as any grand jury redactions in the Mueller report itself, by October 30. She rules that an impeachment resolution voted on by the full House has never been required for House committees to perform an impeachment investigation.
  - The House subpoenas OMB officials Michael Duffey and Russell Vought, and Brechbuhl to testify in the impeachment inquiry on November 5 and 6.
  - Former Deputy National Security Advisor Charles Kupperman files suit asking for guidance from a federal court on whether he should comply with a Congressional subpoena issued by the impeachment inquiry or follow the White House's instructions to ignore it.
- October 26: House impeachment investigators depose Philip T. Reeker, the acting under secretary in charge of European and Eurasian Affairs.
- October 27: Kupperman skips his scheduled deposition with House impeachment investigators.
- October 28: Alexander Vindman releases his opening statement for his deposition the next day.
- October 29: House impeachment investigators depose Lieutenant Colonel Alexander Vindman.
- October 30:
  - The Court order to turn over Mueller's secret grand jury evidence to the House Judiciary Committee, which Attorney General William Barr had withheld, is stayed during appeal.
  - House impeachment investigators depose State Department Ukraine expert Catherine Croft and foreign service officer Christopher Anderson.
  - Acting assistant secretary for international security affairs Kathryn Wheelbarger misses her rescheduled deposition.
- October 31:
  - House impeachment investigators depose National Security Council Russia and Europe Director Tim Morrison.
  - The House passes a resolution putting in place formal rules for the impeachment process.
  - In a hearing on McGahn's challenge to a Congressional subpoena for testimony, Judge Ketanji Brown Jackson calls the Trump administration's claim that McGahn cannot be compelled to testify a "peculiar" argument threatening the checks and balances in the Constitution.
  - In the Kupperman case, Judge Richard J. Leon sets December 10 as an expedited hearing date.
  - Senior U.S. District Judge Ellen Huvelle dismisses Corsi's December 9, 2018, lawsuit against Mueller based on the merits of his arguments, his lack of standing to sue Mueller for Fourth Amendment claims, and his serving Mueller over a month after the deadline to do so.

=== November ===
- November 1:
  - The OLC issues an opinion stating that Executive Branch employees cannot be compelled to testify before Congress without the assistance of counsel from the agencies for which they work.
  - U.S. Department of Energy press secretary Shaylyn Hynes announces that Secretary Rick Perry will not participate in impeachment depositions, saying he "will not partake in a secret star chamber inquisition where agency counsel is forbidden to be present."
- November 2: The DoJ starts to produce memos documenting what witnesses told Mueller's office and the FBI during their investigation.
- November 4:
  - Four White House officials fail to appear to give subpoenaed Congressional testimony for the impeachment inquiry: John Eisenberg, Michael Ellis, Robert Blair, and Brian McCormack. The four were ordered not to testify by the White House, which claims the subpoenas are not valid. The White House also claims Eisenberg has blanket immunity from being forced to appear.
  - Parnas's attorney Joseph A. Bondy announces that Parnas is ready to assist the House impeachment inquiry with testimony and documents.
- November 5:
  - Trial of Roger Stone begins.
  - Duffey and National Security Council (NSC) director of international energy and environment Wells Griffith fail to appear for their depositions in the impeachment inquiry.
- November 6:
  - Opening arguments in the Stone trial.
  - Under Secretary of State David Hale is deposed in the impeachment inquiry. Vought and Brechbuhl fail to appear for their depositions.
- November 7:
  - Credico testifies for the prosecution in the Stone trial.
  - National security aide to Pence and State Department employee Jennifer Williams is deposed in the impeachment inquiry. John Bolton skips his voluntary deposition.
- November 8:
  - Credico and Bannon testify in Stone's trial.
  - Mulvaney refuses to testify before Congress for the impeachment inquiry. His outside counsel William Pittard informs the investigating committees one minute before his scheduled deposition that he was directed by the White House not to testify.
  - Bolton's attorney Charles Cooper informs House general counsel Douglas Letter that Bolton has a lot to tell about Ukraine but will not testify unless he receives a subpoena.
  - OMB official Mark Sandy fails to appear for his deposition in the impeachment inquiry.
- November 12:
  - Gates testifies in Stone's trial. The prosecution rests its case before lunch. The defense plays one hour of a recording of Stone's testimony before the House Intelligence Committee, then rests without calling any witnesses.
  - The Republican staff of the House Intelligence, Oversight, and Foreign Affairs Committees circulates a memo among Republican members of the committees to update them on "key points of evidence" from the closed-door impeachment hearings that bolster Trump's defense. A subsection of the background information section discusses what they describe as interference by senior Ukrainian government officials in the 2016 U.S. election.
- November 13:
  - The prosecution and defense make closing arguments in the Roger Stone trial.
  - Taylor and Kent testify in the first public impeachment hearing before the House Intelligence Committee.
- November 15:
  - The jury convicts Stone on all seven counts brought by Special Counsel Robert Mueller of lying to Congress: obstruction of proceedings, five counts of false statements, and one count of witness tampering about his efforts to learn about the anti-secrecy group WikiLeaks' release of hacked Democratic emails in the 2016 presidential election.
  - Former Ambassador Yovanovitch testifies in a public impeachment hearing before the House Intelligence Committee.
  - House impeachment investigators depose U.S. Embassy in Ukraine official David Holmes.
  - The White House releases a "memorandum of telephone conversation", also referred to as a "rough transcript," of the July 25 phone call with Zelenskyy.
- November 16: House impeachment investigators depose OMB official Mark Sandy.
- November 18:
  - It is reported that the House of Representatives is investigating whether Trump lied to Special Counsel Robert Mueller.
  - The D.C. Circuit Court of Appeals schedules arguments for access by House for unredacted Mueller Grand Jury materials. House counsel Douglas Letter argues that the House needs it immediately for the impeachment probe.
  - Paul Erickson pleads guilty to federal wire fraud and money laundering charges. One charge includes transferring $1,000 of an investor's money to Maria Butina.
- November 19:
  - U.S. District Court Judge Ketanji Brown Jackson announces that she will issue a ruling on November 25 on whether McGahn must honor a subpoena and testify before Congress. The announcement comes after House counsel Doug Letter files a request to expedite the decision so that McGahn's testimony can be used in the impeachment investigation.
  - Vindman, Williams, Volker, and Morrison testify in public impeachment hearings before the House Intelligence Committee.
- November 20:
  - Speaking at an economic forum in Moscow, Putin says, "Thank God nobody is accusing us anymore of interfering in U.S. elections.... Now they're accusing Ukraine. Well, let them sort this out among themselves."
  - Sondland, Cooper, and Hale testify in public impeachment hearings before the House Intelligence Committee.
- November 21:
  - According to a leaked copy of the justice department Inspector General's report on the origins of the Russia investigation, a former low-level FBI lawyer is under criminal investigation by the Justice Department for allegedly altering documents in 2016 related to the FISA Court-approved surveillance of Carter Page.
  - In the same leaked document, the Inspector General's report exonerates the FBI of any possible wrongdoing in the origin of the Russia probe.
  - David Holmes and Fiona Hill testify in a public impeachment hearing before the House Intelligence Committee. Hill tells the Committee that the narrative pushed by its Republican members that Ukraine, not Russia, interfered in the 2016 U.S. election "is a fictional narrative that has been perpetrated and propagated by the Russian security services themselves."

D.C. District Court ruling ordering Don McGahn to follow a Congressional subpoena to appear before the House Judiciary Committee

- November 25: Judge Jackson rules that McGahn must testify.
- November 26: Nadler invites Trump or his counsel to participate in the House Judiciary Committee's first impeachment hearing scheduled for December 4.
- November 27: Federal appeals court stays Judge Jackson's ruling regarding whether McGahn must comply with a House subpoena. Schedules oral arguments for January.
- November 29: Nadler informs Trump that he must decide by December 6 whether or not to participate in the House Judiciary Committee's impeachment hearings after that date.

=== December ===
Report of Evidence in the Democrats' Impeachment Inquiry in the House of Representatives – the Republican response to the impeachment inquiry

- December 1: Cipollone rejects Nadler's offer for Trump or his attorneys to participate in the December 4 House Judiciary Committee impeachment hearing, calling the entire impeachment process unfair.
- December 2:
  - The House Intelligence Committee circulates among members its draft report on the impeachment investigation.
  - Judge Ketanji Brown Jackson refuses to extend stay on the McGahn case.
  - Republican members of the House Intelligence, Oversight, and Foreign Affairs committees release their own report on the impeachment inquiry that calls Schiff unfair and claims that Ukraine interfered in the 2016 U.S. election.
  - Politico reports that the Senate Intelligence Committee was unable to find any evidence that the Ukrainian government interfered in the 2016 presidential election.
- December 3:
  The Trump-Ukraine Impeachment Inquiry Report released by the House Intelligence Committee
  - The House Intelligence Committee votes 13–9 along party lines to release the report on their impeachment inquiry.
  - The DoJ unseals an indictment against Nader and several American straw donors for 2016 donations to Clinton, other Democrats, and the Trump inauguration on behalf of U.A.E. Crown Prince Mohammed bin Zayed al-Nahyan (MbZ). The indictment alleges Nader reimbursed the others for $3.5 million in donations in their names.
- December 4:
  - Leaked IG report draft shows that U.S. Attorney John Durham, who had been conducting an investigation into the origins of the Russia probe told Horowitz that he had found no evidence of any wrongdoing and that right-wing conspiracy theories were merely that.
  - The House Judiciary Committee holds its first impeachment hearing. The hearing focuses on what is considered impeachable, with testimony provided by four constitutional law professors: Noah Feldman, Pamela Karlan, Michael Gerhardt, and Jonathan Turley.
- December 5: Pelosi asks House committee chairs to prepare articles of impeachment against President Trump.
- December 6:
  - Cipollone rejects Nadler's invitation for Trump or his attorneys to participate in the House Judiciary Committee's impeachment hearings, writing, "House Democrats have wasted enough of America’s time with this charade. You should end this inquiry now and not waste even more time with additional hearings."
  - Senators Grassley, Graham, and Johnson, in their respective roles as chairs of the Senate Finance, Judiciary, and Homeland Security and Government Affairs committees, jointly send requests to Chalupa and Andreii Telizhenko to produce documents and appear for staff-level interviews about their alleged roles in alleged Ukrainian interference in the 2016 presidential election.
  - The FTC unanimously rules that Cambridge Analytica, its CEO Nix, and Kogan deceived Facebook users about the nature of the app Kogan wrote to harvest user data from Facebook in 2015.
- December 9:
  DoJ Inspector General report – Review of Four FISA Applications and Other Aspects of the FBI's Crossfire Hurricane Investigation
  - The DoJ Inspector General Horowitz's report on the Russia investigation is released, confirming previously leaked exonerations. Among the report's conclusions is a finding that Mifsud was never an FBI source, contrary to assertions by Papadopoulos.
  - House Intelligence Committee staffers present to the House Judiciary Committee the case for the impeachment of the President. During the hearing, Dan Goldman claimed "Trump's persistent and continuing effort to coerce a foreign country to help him cheat to win an election is a clear and present danger to our free and fair elections and to our national security."
- December 10:
  - House Judiciary Committee introduced two articles of impeachment against Trump, charging him with abuse of power and obstruction of the impeachment inquiry.
  - Trump castigates FBI Director Wray on Twitter for supporting the conclusions of the DoJ IG report.
  - At a hearing in the Kupperman case, House lawyers move to dismiss his lawsuit asking for guidance on whether he should comply with Congressional subpoenas. They assure Judge Leon that they have dropped his subpoena and will not be calling him to testify in the future. Kupperman's lawyer asks the judge to continue the case so that Kupperman can get a definitive answer.
- December 11:
  - The Senate Judiciary Committee holds hearings on the DoJ IG report. IG Horowitz tells the committee that the investigation into the New York FBI field office leaking information about the Clinton email investigation to Giuliani in 2016 is still underway.
  - The House Judiciary Committee begins debating the articles of impeachment.
- December 12: The House Judiciary Committee continues debating the articles of impeachment for 14 hours, with the Democratic majority voting down Republican amendments that would have diluted the articles.
- December 13:
  - House Judiciary Committee approves articles of impeachment against President Trump on a partisan vote.
  - The Supreme Court grants certiorari on Presidential immunity in criminal cases.
- December 16:
  - Mike Flynn's sentencing is rescheduled after U.S. District Judge Emmet G. Sullivan D.C. dismissed Flynn's motion to find prosecutors in contempt.
  - The House Judiciary Committee files a supplemental brief in the U.S. Court of Appeals for the D.C. Circuit regarding the committee's suit to access Mueller grand jury material.
- December 17:
  - Rick Gates sentenced to 45 days in jail and three years probation.
  - The House Rules Committee debates and approves the rules for the House impeachment debate and vote.
- December 18:
  - The House votes to pass both articles of impeachment against President Trump, making him only the third President in American history to have been impeached.
  - New York state judge Maxwell Wiley rules that the March 13 state charges brought against Manafort violate the state's double jeopardy law, which prevents someone from being prosecuted under state law for crimes they were already convicted of in federal court.
  - The FTC approves a settlement agreement with Nix and Kogan that prohibits them "from making false or deceptive statements" about their collection of Facebook user data, and requires that they destroy any data they retained.
- December 20: Justice Department claims that McGahn case is moot now that impeachment has been done.
- December 23: In reply, the House's counsel states that further impeachment articles are possible and thus the suit "In re: Don McGahn" is not moot.
- December 24: Deadline for written arguments in the Justice Department's appeal of the lawsuit over access by House impeachment investigators to the Mueller Grand Jury evidence and to force the testimony of McGahn.
- December 30: The Bolton/Kupperman case is dismissed as moot.

== See also ==
- Criminal charges brought in the Mueller special counsel investigation
- Foreign interference in the 2020 United States elections
- Russian interference in the 2016 Brexit referendum
- Russian interference in the 2018 United States elections
- Timelines related to Donald Trump and Russian interference in United States elections
- Trump–Ukraine scandal
