= In re: Don McGahn =

2019–2021 US constitutional law dispute

D.C. District Court ruling ordering Don McGahn to follow a congressional subpoena to appear before the House Judiciary Committee

In re: Don McGahn (also: Committee on the Judiciary, United States House of Representatives v. Donald F. McGahn II; U.S. House Judiciary Committee v. Donald F. McGahn) is a U.S. constitutional case lawsuit (1:19-cv-02379) filed in the United States District Court for the District of Columbia by the House Judiciary Committee to compel the testimony of former White House Counsel Donald F. McGahn Jr. under subpoena. McGahn was put under subpoena to testify regarding his knowledge of the Russia investigation and Mueller Report and whether President Donald Trump's actions could constitute obstruction of justice. The case gained importance as the House launched impeachment proceedings against Trump regarding the Trump–Ukraine scandal.

In April 2019, the House Judiciary Committee subpoenaed McGahn to testify before Congress about potential obstruction of justice on the part of the Trump administration. The administration directed McGahn to ignore the subpoena, claiming that he was "absolutely immune" from compelled congressional testimony. In August 2019, the Judiciary Committee sued McGahn to compel his testimony. On November 25, 2019, U.S. District Court Judge Ketanji Brown Jackson ruled that McGahn must testify, declaring that "no one is above the law," but allowed McGahn to invoke executive privilege on certain questions. Jackson's ruling said that the claim of the Justice Department (DOJ) to "unreviewable absolute testimonial immunity" is "baseless, and as such, cannot be sustained". The ruling is laced with references to and quotes from the Founding Fathers of the United States and the Constitution's Framers.

The case was appealed by the DOJ, representing Don McGahn, and on November 26, 2019, the DOJ asked Jackson to put a temporary stay on her order so they could appeal it. The Justice Department requested a second stay pending an appeal of the ruling, but Judge Jackson rejected that request on December 2, 2019, calling the DOJ's assertion that the Judiciary Committee would not be harmed by a stay "disingenuous". In August 2020, the full US Court of Appeals for the District of Columbia Circuit ruled 7-2 that the House of Representatives could sue to subpoena McGahn. However, on August 31, 2020, the appeals court ruled 2–1 that Congress had never passed a law empowering the House of Representatives to sue to enforce a subpoena, and that, until such a law exists, the House cannot sue for this purpose and therefore has no mechanism to force McGahn's compliance.

In December 2020, the House Judiciary Committee told the DC Circuit Court of Appeals that it would reissue its subpoena to McGahn in the next Congress. In May 2021, the Committee and the Biden administration reached an undisclosed agreement, which involved the avoidance of arguments in the court which were to take place that month.

== Ruling ==
On November 25, 2019, U.S. District Court Judge Ketanji Brown Jackson ruled that McGahn must testify, declaring that "presidents are not kings" and "no one is above the law." Jackson's 118-page ruling allowed McGahn to invoke executive privilege on certain questions, but not defy the subpoena.

=== Excerpts ===
Excerpts from the ruling include:

When DOJ insists that Presidents can lawfully prevent their senior-level aides from responding to compelled congressional process and that neither the federal courts nor Congress has the power to do anything about it, DOJ promotes a conception of separation-of-powers principles that gets these constitutional commands exactly backwards. In reality, it is a core tenet of this Nation's founding that the powers of a monarch must be split between the branches of the government to prevent tyranny.

and

Stated simply, the primary takeaway from the past 250 years of recorded American history is that Presidents are not kings. See The Federalist No. 51 (James Madison); The Federalist No. 69 (Alexander Hamilton); 1 Alexis de Tocqueville, Democracy in America 115–18 (Harvey C. Mansfield & Delba Winthrop eds. & trans., Univ. of Chicago Press 2000) (1835). This means that they do not have subjects, bound by loyalty or blood, whose destiny they are entitled to control. Rather, in this land of liberty, it is indisputable that current and former employees of the White House work for the People of the United States, and that they take an oath to protect and defend the Constitution of the United States. Moreover, as citizens of the United States, current and former senior-level presidential aides have constitutional rights, including the right to free speech, and they retain these rights even after they have transitioned back into private life. To be sure, there may well be circumstances in which certain aides of the President possess confidential, classified, or privileged information that cannot be divulged in the national interest and that such aides may be bound by statute or executive order to protect. But, in this Court's view, the withholding of such information from the public square in the national interest and at the behest of the President is a duty that the aide herself possesses. Furthermore, as previously mentioned, in the context of compelled congressional testimony, such withholding is properly and lawfully executed on a question-by-question basis through the invocation of a privilege, where appropriate. (Note: There is a footnote in the source stating: "With respect to such withholding, the President can certainly identify sensitive information that he deems subject to executive privilege, United States v. Nixon, 418 U.S. at 713, and his doing so gives rise to a legal duty on the part of the aide to invoke the privilege on the President's behalf when, in the course of his testimony, he is asked a question that would require disclosure of that information. But the invocation of the privilege by a testifying aide is an order of magnitude different than DOJ's current claim that the President essentially owns the entirety of a senior-level aide's testimony such that the White House can order the individual not to appear before Congress at all.") As such, with the exception of the recognized restrictions on the ability of current and former public officials to disclose certain protected information, such officials (including senior-level presidential aides) still enjoy the full measure of freedom that the Constitution affords. Thus, DOJ's present assertion that the absolute testimonial immunity that senior-level presidential aides possess is, ultimately, owned by the President, and can be invoked by the President to overcome the aides' own will to testify, is a proposition that cannot be squared with core constitutional values, and for this reason alone, it cannot be sustained.

To make the point as plain as possible, it is clear to this Court for the reasons explained above that, with respect to senior-level presidential aides, absolute immunity from compelled congressional process simply does not exist. Indeed, absolute testimonial immunity for senior-level White House aides appears to be a fiction that has been fastidiously maintained over time through the force of sheer repetition in OLC opinions, and through accommodations that have permitted its proponents to avoid having the proposition tested in the crucible of litigation. And because the contention that a President’s top advisors cannot be subjected to compulsory congressional process simply has no basis in the law, it does not matter whether such immunity would theoretically be available to only a handful of presidential aides due to the sensitivity of their positions, or to the entire Executive branch. Nor does it make any difference whether the aides in question are privy to national security matters, or work solely on domestic issues. And, of course, if present frequent occupants of the West Wing or Situation Room must find time to appear for testimony as a matter of law when Congress issues a subpoena, then any such immunity most certainly stops short of covering individuals who only purport to be cloaked with this authority because, at some point in the past, they once were in the President's employ. This was the state of law when Judge Bates first considered the issue of whether former White House Counsel Harriet Miers had absolute testimonial immunity in 2008, and it remains the state of law today, and it goes without saying that the law applies to former White House Counsel Don McGahn, just as it does to other current and former senior-level White House officials. Thus, for the myriad reasons laid out above as well as those that are articulated plainly in the prior precedents of the Supreme Court, the D.C. Circuit, and the U.S. District Court for the District of Columbia, this Court holds that individuals who have been subpoenaed for testimony by an authorized committee of Congress must appear for testimony in response to that subpoena—i.e., they cannot ignore or defy congressional compulsory process, by order of the President or otherwise. Notably, however, in the context of that appearance, such individuals are free to assert any legally applicable privilege in response to the questions asked of them, where appropriate.

=== Conclusion ===
Jackson's ruling concludes with a statement regarding the rule of law and checks and balances under the United States Constitution. The first paragraph of the conclusion is:

The United States of America has a government of laws and not of men. The Constitution and federal law set the boundaries of what is acceptable conduct, and for this reason, as explained above, when there is a dispute between the Legislature and the Executive branch over what the law requires about the circumstances under which government officials must act, the Judiciary has the authority, and the responsibility, to decide the issue. Moreover, as relevant here, when the issue in dispute is whether a government official has the duty to respond to a subpoena that a duly authorized committee of the House of Representatives has issued pursuant to its Article I authority, the official’s defiance unquestionably inflicts a cognizable injury on Congress, and thereby, substantially harms the national interest as well. These injuries give rise to a right of a congressional committee to seek to vindicate its constitutionally conferred investigative power in the context of a civil action filed in court.

== Appeal ==
The case was appealed by the Department of Justice, representing Don McGahn. Reacting on Twitter, McGahn attorney William Burck said McGahn will comply unless the order is stayed pending appeal, and on November 26, the Department of Justice asked Jackson to put a temporary stay on her order so they can appeal it. The Justice Department requested a second stay pending an appeal of the ruling, but on December 2 judge Jackson rejected that request, calling the DOJ's assertion that the House Judiciary Committee would not be harmed by a stay "disingenuous." Jackson wrote, "DOJ's argument here that any further delay will not be harmful to the Judiciary Committee because, in essence, DOJ has already harmed the Committee's interests by successfully delaying its access to other materials strikes this Court as an unacceptable mischaracterization of the injury at issue."

The day after the President was impeached on December 18, the Department of Justice requested that the judgment be summarily reversed because the point was mooted by the House vote. In a reply on December 23, House Counsel Douglas Letter said it was not, as supplemental articles might still be issued.

=== Amicus briefs ===
Several organizations submitted amicus curiae briefs to the D.C. Circuit Court of Appeals regarding the case.

Several conservative lawyers such as George Conway and Republican former members of Congress submitted a brief in support of the original ruling. In their brief, they stated that a Constitutional originalist view of the dispute requires the courts to force McGahn to appear, even more so because of the then-ongoing impeachment proceedings. They cited examples from the late 1700s and early 1800s of Congress exercising oversight powers and having access to executive branch officials and their documents to support their brief.

=== 3-judge panel ruling and rehearing en banc ===
On February 28, 2020, a divided panel of the United States Court of Appeals for the District of Columbia Circuit vacated the district court's judgment and ordered the House's lawsuit dismissed. Circuit Judge Thomas B. Griffith, joined by Circuit Judge Karen LeCraft Henderson, determined that the separation of powers under the United States Constitution does not allow Congress to use the Courts to force Executive officials to testify. Judge Henderson wrote a concurrence in which she argued the House simply did not have standing to sue in this instance. Judge Judith W. Rogers wrote a dissent. On March 13, 2020, the D.C. Court of Appeals granted an appeal for an en banc hearing and vacated the February 28, 2020 decision. The en banc hearing occurred on April 28, 2020. On August 7, 2020, the full nine judge panel for the US Court of Appeals for the District of Columbia Circuit ruled 7–2 that the House of Representatives could sue to subpoena McGahn. However, on August 31, the appeals court ruled 2–1 that Congress had never passed a law empowering the House of Representatives to sue to enforce a subpoena, and that, until such a law exists, the House cannot sue for this purpose and therefore has no mechanism to force McGahn's compliance.

=== Settlement and end of controversy ===
In December 2020, the House Judiciary Committee told the DC Circuit Court of Appeals that it would reissue its subpoena to McGahn in the next Congress. However, Trump's term ended, and the Biden administration and the committee made an agreement to end the controversy.

== See also ==
- Timeline of investigations into Trump and Russia (2019)
- Timeline of investigations into Trump and Russia (2020–2021)
