= Timeline of investigations into Donald Trump and Russia =

The timeline of investigations into Donald Trump and Russia is split into the following pages:

November 8, 2016–January 2017

- Timeline of post-election transition following Russian interference in the 2016 United States elections

2017

- Timeline of investigations into Donald Trump and Russia (January–June 2017)
- Timeline of investigations into Donald Trump and Russia (July–December 2017)

2018

- Timeline of investigations into Donald Trump and Russia (January–June 2018)
- Timeline of investigations into Donald Trump and Russia (July–December 2018)

2019

- Timeline of investigations into Donald Trump and Russia (January–June 2019)
- Timeline of investigations into Donald Trump and Russia (July–December 2019)

2020–2022

- Timeline of investigations into Donald Trump and Russia (2020–2022)

== See also ==
- Timelines related to Donald Trump and Russian interference in United States elections
- False or misleading statements by Donald Trump
