= Timeline of post-election transition following Russian interference in the 2016 United States elections =

This is a chronology of significant events in 2016 and 2017 related to links between Trump associates and Russian officials during the Trump presidential transition and the Russian interference in the 2016 United States elections. Following the timeline of Russian interference in the 2016 United States elections before and after July 2016, this article begins on November 8 (election day) and ends with Donald Trump and Mike Pence being sworn into office on January 20, 2017. The investigations continued in the first and second halves of 2017, the first and second halves of 2018, the first and second halves of 2019, 2020, and 2021.

== Post-election transition ==
=== November 2016 ===
- November–December: Michael Flynn serves as an advisor to SCL Group, the parent company of Cambridge Analytica.The agreement was broken shortly after the election.
- November:
  - Mangiante quits the London Centre of International Law Practice after complaining to Mifsud about not being paid her salary.
  - Paul Manafort and Rick Gates falsely assert in writing to the Justice Department that their work for the Ukrainian government did not require registering as foreign agents in the United States. In September 2018, Manafort pleads guilty to lying to the Justice Department about the extent of his work for Ukraine.
  - The GRU targets over 120 Florida election officials' email accounts with spearphishing attacks. They receive emails purportedly from VR Systems, the state's voter registration and election results service provider, asking them to open a purported Word document containing a trojan. At least some emails contain British spellings and come from Gmail accounts, which VR Systems doesn't use. Many of the emails are flagged by spam filters. They also receive an email from VR's chief operating officer warning them about the malicious emails. Later, the FBI believes one county government's network was compromised in a way that would have given security hackers the ability to alter voter registration data, but this is disputed by state election officials.
  - The Trump Organization seeks to close out deals before the inauguration, including the Trump Tower Moscow project.
  - Admiral Rogers interviews with the Trump transition team in New York City to be the next Director National of Intelligence.
- November 8:
  - Trump is elected President of the United States.
  - Hours after the polls close, the hashtag #Calexit is retweeted by thousands of IRA accounts.
  - Rospatent, the Russian government agency responsible for intellectual property, grants 10-year extensions on four of Trump's trademarks.
- November 8–December: After the election, a Russian hacker breaks into Election Assistance Commission servers and steals the login credentials for over 100 users. The hack is discovered by chance when Recorded Future, a security firm, comes across the credentials being offered for sale on the dark web to a Middle Eastern government.
- November 8–January:
  - During the transition period, the FBI warns Trump aide Hope Hicks at least twice that she might be approached by Russian government operatives using fake identities.
  - The British Foreign Office holds a series of meetings with Cambridge Analytica executives in London, Washington, and New York to "better understand" how Trump won and acquire insights into the "political environment" following his win.
- November 9:
  - Dimitriev receives a text message stating "Putin has won" after news reports announce that Clinton called Trump to concede the election result. Later that morning, Dmitriev reaches out to Nader expressing the desire to build closer relationships with the U.S. and the Trump team. He tells Nader that he will ask Putin for permission to travel to the U.S. so that he can speak to media outlets about the positive impact of the Trump election on U.S.-Russia relations. He flies to New York to join Peskov at a chess tournament and asks Nader to invite Kushner to join them. Nader does not pass the invitation along, and Mueller's team is unable to establish that anyone from the Trump campaign or transition team attended the tournament.
  - Papadopoulos and Sergei Millian make arrangements to meet in Chicago to discuss business opportunities, including with Russian "billionaires who are not under sanctions."
- November 10:
  - Kislyak states that Russia was not involved with U.S. election hacking.
  - Russian Deputy Foreign Minister Sergei Ryabkov tells the Interfax news agency "there were contacts" with the Trump team during the campaign. He says, "I don't say that all of them, but a whole array of them supported contacts with Russian representatives."
  - Russian Foreign Ministry spokeswoman Maria Zakharova tells Bloomberg News that it was "normal practice" for Russian Embassy staffers to meet with members of the Trump campaign. She says the Clinton campaign declined requests for meetings.
  - In a private Oval Office meeting, Obama warns Trump against hiring Flynn.
  - Mark Zuckerberg calls the idea that "fake news" on Facebook could have influenced the election "crazy."
- November 11:
  - Hicks denies claims by the Kremlin that Trump officials met with its staff. In December 2017, Hicks tells Mueller's team that after making the statement she consulted with Kellyanne Conway, Stephen Miller, Jason Miller, Kushner, and Bannon to ensure that it was true.
  - House Intelligence Committee Chairman Devin Nunes is named to the executive committee of the Trump transition team.
  - Mike Pence replaces Chris Christie as chairman of the Trump transition team. Christie later claims he was fired for opposing Michael Flynn becoming the National Security Advisor. Steve Bannon and Flynn celebrate Christie's firing by ceremonially throwing binders full of administration candidates into the trash.
  - A large banner is hung from the Arlington Memorial Bridge in Washington, D.C., showing a photo of Obama with the words "Goodbye Murderer" at the bottom. The IRA Twitter account @LeroyLovesUSA takes credit and is an early promoter of the banner.
  - Calk calls Trump transition team member Dennis Raico about a possible role in the Trump administration.
- November 12:
  - Butina holds a birthday party at Cafe Deluxe in Washington, D.C., attended by Erickson and Trump campaign aides. She claims to be part of Russian communications with the Trump campaign, something she has bragged about for months.
  - A Trump protest called "Trump is NOT my President" attracts 5,000–10,000 protestors in Manhattan who march from Union Square to Trump Tower. The protest is organized by the IRA using their BlackMattersUS Facebook account.
  - Banks, Farage and Wigmore visit Trump Tower unannounced and are invited inside by Bannon. They have a long meeting with Trump. Wigmore asks Trump's receptionist for the Trump transition team's contact information.
- November 13: Zakharova jokingly comments on the Rossiya 1 show Sunday Evening with Vladimir Solovyov that "our people in Brighton Beach won the election for Donald Trump."
- November 14:
  - Papadopoulos and Millian meet at the Chicago Trump International Hotel and Tower bar. Millian appears nervous to Papadopoulos as he offers a job working for a Russian billionaire not under sanctions. The job requires that he continue working for Trump and join the new administration. Papadopoulos declines the offer, saying he is only interested in private sector jobs. Later, Papadopoulos says he declined the offer because he knew it was unethical and possibly illegal, and feared it might have been an FBI setup.
  - Page submits an application to the Trump transition team for a position in the new administration. The team never responds.
  - Google searches for election results return as the top search result an alleged news story based upon tweets that claims Trump won the popular vote, contradicting the results displayed above it on the results page. In 2019, the Senate Intelligence Committee mentions the incident in its report on Russian interference in U.S. elections as an example of how Google search results can be manipulated.
- November 15:
  - Devin Nunes replaces former Representative Mike Rogers as a Trump transition team national security advisor.
  - Banks and Wigmore meet with Yakovenko in London; they discuss their November 12 meeting with Trump, and Sessions's role in the new administration. At Yakovenko's request, Banks provides Yakovenko with contact information for the Trump transition team.
- November 16: Calk's bank approves a $9.5 million loan for Manafort.
- November 16–17: Kislyak arranges a December 1 meeting with Kushner. Kushner asks his executive assistant Catherine Vargas to confirm with Simes that Kislyak is the right person to talk to. She checks and responds that Kislyak is good for routine matters, but Russian foreign policy advisor Yuri Ushakov is the contact for "more direct/substantial matters."
- November 17: The Senate Intelligence Committee holds a closed hearing on Russian active measures.
- November 18:
  - Trump announces he will nominate Sessions as Attorney General and Flynn as National Security Adviser.
  - Elijah Cummings, ranking member of the House Oversight Committee, sends Pence a letter warning that Flynn's connections to Russia and Turkey might create conflicts of interest. He asks the Trump administration's transition team for documents related to Flynn. Receipt of the letter is acknowledged on November 28.
- November 19:
  - The IRA organizes the "Charlotte Against Trump" rally in Charlotte, North Carolina.
  - Obama privately meets Mark Zuckerberg at a gathering of world leaders in Lima, Peru. Obama urges Zuckerberg to take the threats of political disinformation and "fake news" seriously, and warns him that doing nothing will cause problems in the next election. Zuckerberg responds that there were only a few messages, and doing something about the problem would be difficult.
- November 21:
  - Trump calls for Nigel Farage to be made the U.K. Ambassador to the United States. The British government responds, "There is no vacancy."
  - Peter W. Smith, who launched a search for copies of Clinton's deleted emails in September, asserts WikiLeaks has had the emails for nine months but has not released them. In July 2017, WikiLeaks denies the assertion in response to a question by Politico.
- Late November: Senior members of Trump's transition team warn Flynn about the dangers of contacting Kislyak, including that Kislyak's conversations are probably being monitored by the FBI and the NSA. Flynn is recorded a month later discussing sanctions with Kislyak.
- November 23–28: Kaveladze and Rob Goldstone attempt to set up a meeting between Natalia Veselnitskaya and the Trump transition team during Veselnitskaya's trip to the U.S.
- November 25: Trump announces K. T. McFarland will be the deputy national security advisor for his new administration after Paul Erickson lobbies former campaign officials and Trump donors to get her the position.
- November 28: The IRA "Being Patriotic" Facebook account posts "Romney was one of the first men who started the NeverTrump movement. It will be a terrible mistake if Trump sets him as the next secretary of state." The posting appears in the news feeds of 216,000 followers.
- November 30:
  - On a recommendation from the GSA, Trump transition team members discuss installing Signal, an encrypted messaging app, on Flynn's phone to encrypt his communications.
  - Kislyak meets with Kushner and Flynn at Trump Tower. Bannon is invited but does not attend. Kushner tells Kislyak that the new administration wants to start afresh with U.S.-Russia relations. He asks Kislyak who the best person is to hold future discussions with who has direct contact with, and can speak for, Putin. They discuss Syria, and Kislyak suggests that Russian generals brief the transition team over a secure line. Flynn says the transition team doesn't have one, and Kushner asks if they can use the secure facilities in the Russian Embassy. Kislyak rejects the idea. In May 2017, the meeting is made public by an anonymous letter to The Washington Post that cites leaked intercepts of Russian diplomatic communications.
  - Russian Foreign Ministry spokesperson Zakharova asserts at a press briefing that the Ukrainian government deliberately undermined the Trump campaign during the summer of 2016 by fabricating evidence of Manafort's involvement in Ukrainian corruption.
  - Manafort recommends Calk and two other candidates to Kushner for major appointments in the administration.

=== December 2016 ===
- December:
  - Concerned that the incoming Trump administration will suppress the information collected in the Russia investigation, the White House spreads it across government agencies to leave a trail for future investigators.
  - At an "all-hands" oligarch meeting, Putin tasks Alfa-Bank head Petr Aven with establishing a private communications channel with the Trump transition team. Aven assigns the task to Richard Burt, whose primary role at Alfa-Bank is to facilitate introductions to business contacts in the U.S. and other Western countries. Burt reaches out to Simes, whom he knows through his work as a board member of CNI. Simes declines to assist in setting up a secret communications channel because of media attention on Russian interference in the election and didn't want CNI to be seen as the intermediary.
- Early December: In Russia, FSB cyber chief Sergei Mikhailov, senior Kaspersky Lab researcher Ruslan Stoyanov, and hacker Dmitry Dokuchayev (known as "Forb") are arrested for treason.
- December 6: During a National Security Council meeting, Obama instructs Clapper to have the intelligence community prepare a comprehensive report on Russian interference in the presidential election.
- December 8
  - The IRA runs an ad on Craigslist to hire someone to walk around New York City dressed as Santa Claus while wearing a Trump mask.
  - Kilimnik sends Manafort a detailed email about the proposed Ukrainian peace plan. He writes that the plan is ready to move forward if Trump appoints Manafort as a "special representative" to manage it, that "[Yanukovych] guarantees your reception at the very top level" in Russia, and that "[Trump] could have peace in Ukraine basically within a few months after inauguration."
  - Page is in Moscow. Kilimnik emails Manafort to inform him of Page's presence, and that Page is telling people he is "authorized to talk to Russia on behalf of [Trump] on a range of issues of mutual interest, including Ukraine."
- December 9:
  - Republican Senator John McCain delivers the Steele dossier to Comey.
  - The Trump transition team dismisses reported intelligence assessments finding Russian interference in the election. Their statement says, "These are the same people that said Saddam Hussein had weapons of mass destruction. The election ended a long time ago in one of the biggest Electoral College victories in history. It's now time to move on and 'Make America Great Again.'"
  - Page dines with Shlomo Weber and Andrej Krickovic of the New Economic School in Moscow. They are briefly joined by Arkady Dvorkovich at Krickovic's invitation. Dvorkovich asks Page to facilitate connecting him with individuals on the transition team to begin discussing future cooperation. He also discusses forming a future academic partnership with Page.
- December 10: Glenn R. Simpson tells Ohr that Cohen was the "go-between from Russia to the Trump campaign", and gives him a memory stick containing evidence. Ohr memorializes the meeting in handwritten notes.
- December 11: Trump tells Chris Wallace on Fox News Sunday that intelligence reports of Russian interference are "ridiculous". He says, "It could be somebody sitting in a bed some place." He claims the Democrats are pushing the story because they lost the election.
- December 12: Kislyak meets with Kushner's assistant, Avi Berkowitz, to arrange a meeting between Kushner and the FSB-connected Sergey Gorkov, head of sanctioned Russian bank Vnesheconombank. He says Gorkov has a direct line to Putin.
- December 13:
  - UBS investment banker Bob Foresman meets with Gorkov and VEB deputy chairman Nikolay Tsekhomsky in Moscow just before Gorkov leaves for New York City to meet with Kushner. They tell Foresman that they are traveling to New York to discuss election issues with U.S. financial institutions on a trip approved by Putin, and will be reporting back to Putin when they return.
  - Gorkov arrives from Moscow to secretly meet Kushner in at the Colony Capital building in New York, before flying to Japan, where Putin is holding a summit. The meeting is first reported in March 2017, and attracts the interest of federal and congressional investigators in May. Kushner later characterizes the meeting as brief and meaningless. The White House later describes the meeting as a diplomatic encounter. The bank later says they discussed Kushner's real estate business. The Mueller investigation is unable to resolve the conflicting accounts.
  - Trump picks Rex Tillerson as Secretary of State; Russian officials praise the decision.
- December 14: Dmitriev reaches out via text messages to Kushner's close friend and hedge fund manager Rick Gerson to help arrange meetings with the Trump transition team to help improve economic cooperation with Russia. Nader had introduced Dmitiev to Gerson in early December. Gerson responds that confidentiality is required before the new administration takes power. He says he will reach out to Kushner and Flynn to find out who the "key person or people" are that Dmitriev should meet with. Dmitriev tells Gerson he was tasked by Putin to develop and execute a reconciliation plan between the U.S. and Russia. In June 2018, Gerson tells Mueller's team that he engaged with Dmitriev as a private citizen and not on behalf of the transition team.
- December 15:
  - Clinton tells a group of donors in Manhattan that Russian hacking was ordered by Putin "because he has a personal beef against me" due to her accusation in 2011 that Russian parliamentary elections that year were rigged. Clinton's comment is backed by U.S. Intelligence reports.
  - Kushner, Gerson, Nader, Flynn, Bannon, U.A.E. ambassador to the U.S. Yousef Al Otaiba, crown prince Mohammed bin Zayed al-Nahyan of Abu Dhabi, and former British prime minister Tony Blair meet at the Four Seasons Hotel in New York City. The crown prince broke diplomatic protocol by traveling to the U.S. without announcing his visit to the U.S. government. In June 2018, a spokesman for Gerson tells NBC News that Blair gave a presentation on Israeli-Palestinian peace.
- December 16: Speaking at his final press conference as president, Obama comes just short of saying Putin was personally behind the DNC and Podesta hacks.
- December 18:
  - Speaking to CBS News, Conway says it is "false" and "dangerous" to suggest that members of the Trump campaign spoke to any Russians during the campaign.
  - Appearing on Fox News Sunday, Priebus declines to state whether Trump accepts the intelligence community's assessment of Russian interference. He denies any contact or coordination between the Russians and the campaign and calls the "whole thing" a Democratic "spin job".
- December 19: Gorkov's assistant Ivanchenko texts Berkowitz, "Hi, please inform your side that the information about the meeting had a very positive response!"
- December 20: The CIA first learns of the Steele Dossier from the FBI.
- December 22:
  - At Kushner's direction, Flynn asks Kislyak to delay or defeat a pending vote on a United Nations Security Council resolution calling on Israel to cease settlement activities in Palestinian territory. Flynn later pleads guilty to lying to the FBI about the effort to defeat the resolution.
  - Burt informs Aven of Sime's decision not to assist with a secret communications channel to the transition team because of the current political climate in the U.S. regarding Russia. Aven tells Burt to drop the project.
- December 23: Kislyak calls Flynn and tells him Russia will not vote against the United Nations Security Council resolution they spoke about the day before. The resolution passes 14–0, with the U.S. abstaining.
- December 26: Oleg Erovinkin, a former KGB official, is found dead in the back seat of his car in Moscow. He was suspected of assisting Steele in compiling his dossier.
- December 28: Kislyak texts Flynn and asks him to call, setting off the series of calls in the following days. Flynn, who is on vacation in the Dominican Republic, does not immediately respond.

Transcript summaries of phone calls between Michael T. Flynn and Sergey Kislyak.

- December 29:
  - The Russian Embassy calls Flynn in the morning, but they do not talk.
  - Following Executive Order 13757 signed the previous day, Obama's administration expels 35 Russian diplomats, locks down two Russian diplomatic compounds, and expands sanctions against Russia. Flynn consults with the Trump transition team, then speaks with Kislyak by telephone to request that Russia not escalate matters in response to Obama's actions. Flynn later pleads guilty to lying to the FBI about his conversations with Kislyak regarding the new sanctions. In December 2017, McFarland tells Mueller's team that Flynn said that Russia will not escalate in response to the sanctions because they want a good relationship with the new administration.
  - Obama also amends Executive Order 13964 to authorize sanctions on individuals who interfere in U.S. elections. The amended order enables sanctions on the GRU, the FSB, the Special Technology Center, Zor Security, the Professional Association of Designers of Data Processing Systems, GRU Chief Igor Valentinovich Korobov, GRU Deputy Chief Sergey Aleksandrovich Gizunov, GRU First Deputy Chief Igor Olegovich Kostyukov, GRU First Deputy Chief Vladimir Stepanovich Alexseyev, hacker Evgeniy Mikhailovich Bogachev, and hacker Aleksey Alekseyevich Belan.
  - Before Flynn's call to Kislyak, K. T. McFarland emails other Trump transition officials saying that Flynn will be speaking to Kislyak to try to prevent a cycle of retaliation over the newly imposed sanctions. The email is forwarded to Flynn, Reince Priebus, Bannon, and Sean Spicer. Trump, Bannon, Spicer, Priebus, and other transition team members are briefed about the new sanctions, and the upcoming Flynn-Kislyak call is discussed. In December 2017, McFarland tells Mueller's team that Trump wanted to use the sanctions as leverage against Russia.
  - The NCCIC releases a joint analysis report (JAR) titled "GRIZZLY STEPPE – Russian Malicious Cyber Activity" as a follow-up to the October 7, 2016, joint statement on election security. The report describes methods used by Russian intelligence groups APT29 and APT28 to penetrate election-related servers. It is the first JAR that attributes cyber activity to a specific country.
  - The Steele dossier is added to the forthcoming Intelligence Community Assessment at the insistence of the FBI over objections from the CIA. The FBI wants the material interwoven into the document, but the CIA strongly objects because of unknown sourcing in the dossier, so it is appended as "Annex A".
  - The NSA first learns of the Steele dossier when reviewing a draft of the forthcoming Intelligence Community Assessment that includes it as "Annex A".
- December 30:
  - Putin announces he will not retaliate against the U.S. expulsions, contrary to recommendations from Lavrov. In reply, Trump tweets "Great move on delay (by V. Putin) – I always knew he was very smart!" This action is widely interpreted as praising Putin's actions.
  - Flynn texts a summary of his Kislyak call to McFarland, who forwards the information by email to Kushner, Bannon, Priebus, and other transition team members. The text and email deliberately omit the sanctions discussion because Flynn doesn't want it documented due to its political sensitivity.
- December 31: Kislyak calls Flynn to tell him that Russia has decided not to retaliate based upon Flynn's request. Afterward, Flynn tells senior members of the transition team, including Bannon, about his conversations with Kislyak and Russia's decision not to escalate.

=== January 2017 ===
- January:
  - McGahn researches the Logan Act and federal laws related to lying to federal investigators. Records turned over to the Mueller investigation show McGahn believes Flynn violated one or more of those laws.
  - The FBI obtains a new FISA warrant for Carter Page, replacing the expired warrant from October 2016.
  - Calk interviews with the Trump transition team to be the Secretary of the Army.
- Early January:
  - At a meeting in CIA headquarters, a U.S. spy chief warns Mossad agents that Putin may have "leverages of pressure" over Trump, and that intelligence should be shared cautiously with the coming White House and National Security Council, for fear of leaks to the Russians and thereby Iran.
  - For two days in early January 2017, in a gathering George Nader attends and brokers, Joel Zamel and General Ahmed Al-Assiri meet with Michael Flynn and other members of the Trump transition team in New York. Bannon was also involved. In October 2018, the meeting comes under the Mueller investigation's scrutiny.
- January 3: Nader meets with Prince at The Pierre Hotel in New York City and encourages him to meet with Dmitriev. In the following days, Nader gives Prince biographical information about Dmitriev, including the fact that Dmitriev oversees the Russian Direct Investment Fund.
- January 4:
  - The FBI begins investigating Flynn's December phone calls with Kislyak.
  - Calk's bank approves a $6.5 million loan for Manafort.
- January 5:
  Susan Rice's unredacted email to herself on Jan 20, 2017.
  - U.S. intelligence agencies release a report concluding that Putin ordered the cyber-campaign to influence the 2016 election.
  - Obama is briefed on the intelligence community's findings. In addition to the classified intelligence community assessment, he is given an unclassified report entitled "Recommendations: Options to Protect and Defend U.S. Election Infrastructure and U.S. Political Parties" produced by DHS, the FBI, and the National Institute of Standards and Technology (NIST).
  - Flynn, Kushner and Bannon meet with the King of Jordan. According to BuzzFeed, they discuss a plan to deploy American nuclear power plants in Jordan with security support from a Russian company. "People close to the three Trump advisers" deny the allegations.
  - R. James Woolsey Jr., who became a senior adviser to Trump in September 2016, resigns amid Congressional hearings into cyber attacks and public statements by Trump critical of the United States Intelligence Community.
  - DHS Secretary Jeh Johnson hosts a conference call with state elections officials in which he discusses designating election infrastructure as critical infrastructure.
- January 6:
  Intelligence Community Assessment - Assessing Russian Activities and Intentions in Recent US Elections
  - The Office of the Director of National Intelligence (ODNI) publishes an unclassified report about Russian meddling in the 2016 election stating that "Putin ordered an influence campaign in 2016 aimed at the US presidential election". While the report says Russian hackers did not change votes, it ignores the security of back-end election systems. Putin was personally involved in the Russian interference, per a CIA stream of intelligence.
  - Director of National Intelligence (DNI) James Clapper, CIA Director John Brennan, NSA Director Michael S. Rogers, and FBI Director James Comey travel to Trump Tower in New York City to brief Trump and senior members of the transition team on the classified version of the ODNI report on Russian interference in the election. They show Trump the intelligence behind their assessment, including human sources confirming Putin's role, and American, British, and Dutch intelligence services seeing stolen DNC documents in Russian military networks. In addition to Trump, the other people present are incoming White House Chief of Staff Reince Priebus, incoming CIA Director Mike Pompeo, incoming National Security Adviser Michael Flynn, and Vice President-elect Mike Pence. After the briefing, Comey stays behind to privately brief Trump on the salacious allegations in the Steele dossier. While cordial during the briefings, Trump still refuses to accept the intelligence on Russian interference. The meeting unsettles Comey and prompts him to write a memo documenting the conversation.
  - Trump is briefed on highly classified intelligence — including from a top-secret source close to Putin — indicating that Putin had personally ordered cyberattacks to influence the 2016 American election.
  - Vekselberg's cousin and Columbus Nova CEO Andrew Intrater donates $250,000 to the Trump inaugural fund. Intrater's previous political donations totaled less than $3,000 across all candidates.
  - Secretary Johnson designates election infrastructure as a subsector of the existing Government Facilities critical infrastructure sector.
- January 7: Prince books his trip to the Seychelles.
- January 8:
  - Bloomberg reports that Ted Malloch was interviewed by the Trump transition team for the position of U.S. Ambassador to the European Union. Malloch was recommended for the position by Nigel Farage. In 2018, Malloch is served a search warrant by the FBI and questioned by Mueller.
  - Nader informs Dmitriev that Prince will be traveling to the Seychelles and invites Dmitriev to meet with Prince on January 12. The next day, Nader assures Dmitriev that Prince wields enough influence in the Trump team to be worth meeting and was designated by Bannon for the trip. In 2018 Nader tells Mueller's team that Prince led him to believe that Bannon was aware of the Dmitriev meeting, and, separately, Prince tells them it was fair for Nader to think he was representing the transition team, but Bannon tells them that Prince didn't inform him of the meeting in advance.
- January 9:
  - Cohen and Vekselberg meet at Trump Tower to discuss their mutual desire to improve Russia's relationship with the U.S. under the Trump administration. After Trump is inaugurated, Cohen receives a $1 million consulting contract from Columbus Nova, headed by Andrew Intrater, who also attended the Vekselberg meeting.
  - Kushner is named Senior Advisor to the President.
  - Profexer, a Ukrainian hacker who is the author of a hacking tool described in the December 29, 2016, NCCIC report on Russian cyber attacks, goes dark. He turns himself in to the Ukrainian police and becomes a cooperating witness for the FBI. The Ukrainian police say he was not placed under arrest.
  - Dmitriev sends his biography to Gerson and asks him to "share it with Jared (or somebody else very senior in the team) - so that they know that we are focused from our side on improving the relationship and my boss asked me to play a key role in that." He also asks if Prince is important or worth spending time with.
- January 10:
  - In a confirmation hearing before the Senate Judiciary Committee, Sessions denies communicating with the Russian government during Trump's election campaign.
  - BuzzFeed publishes the Steele dossier alleging various misdeeds by Trump and associates in Russia. Trump dismisses the dossier as "fake news".
  - The Senate Intelligence Committee holds open and closed hearings on Russian interference in the 2016 election with Comey, Clapper, Brennan, and Rogers testifying.
  - After the Steele dossier is published, Manafort tells Trump that the information about himself isn't true, including the payments in the "Black Ledger". Trump tells Manafort that the information about himself in Moscow and about Cohen being in Prague isn't true.

- January 11:
  - Trump tweets, "Russia has never tried to use leverage over me. I HAVE NOTHING TO DO WITH RUSSIA – NO DEALS, NO LOANS, NO NOTHING!". USA Today says this is "not exactly true".
  - Trump holds a press conference in which he calls the Steele dossier a disgrace and denies having any dealings with Russia.
  - BBC News's Paul Wood writes that the salacious information in Steele's dossier was also reported by "multiple intelligence sources" and "at least one East European intelligence service".
  - Erik Prince, a Trump campaign donor and brother of forthcoming Education Secretary Betsy DeVos, meets in the Seychelles with Kirill Dmitriev, CEO of the Russian government's $10bn Russian Direct Investment Fund (RDIF). They meet in Nader's room for 30–45 minutes, then have a brief meeting at a restaurant on the Four Seasons Hotel property. After the second meeting, Dmitriev tells Nader he is disappointed that Prince didn't have more authority in the Trump team, and that he found Prince's comments to be insulting. Prince will claim in August that he scarcely remembers Dmitriev. Dmitriev's identity is revealed in November 2017, and Prince confirms the meeting in an interview with House investigators on November 30. The meeting was organized by the U.A.E. and reportedly includes talks of a "back channel" with Moscow to try to influence Russian policy in the Middle East, joint U.S.–Russian military operations in Syria, peace between Ukraine and Russia, nuclear non-proliferation, RDIF investment in the midwest, and a joint investment fund between RDIF and the Overseas Private Investment Corporation. George Nader, an adviser to crown prince Mohammed bin Zayed Al Nahyan of the U.A.E., facilitates and attends. In May 2018 Dmitriev suggests the meeting was more than a chance encounter. The meeting occurs amid a series of meetings of politically connected individuals from Russia, France, Saudi Arabia, and South Africa that are part of a larger gathering hosted by the crown prince.
  - Michael Cohen tells Sean Hannity on The Sean Hannity Show that there is no relationship between Russia and the people around Trump or the Trump campaign.
  - Politico publishes a report on its investigation into the involvement of some Ukrainian government officials in the 2016 U.S. presidential election, including helping Alexandra Chalupa with her research and revealing Manafort's name in the Party of Region's "black ledger". The report concludes that the Ukrainian government is too fragmented and factionalized to perform an interference campaign of the scale attributed to Russian interference.
  - Trump asks Clapper, Comey, and other intelligence community leaders to publicly refute the Steele dossier allegations.

- January 12:
  - "Guccifer 2.0" denies having any relation to the Russian government.
  - Deripaska's longtime American lobbyist Adam Waldman makes the first of nine visits with Assange in 2017 at the Ecuadorian Embassy in London.
  - Manafort returns to the U.S. after meeting with Deripaska deputy Georgiy Oganov in Madrid, where they discussed global politics and "recreating [the] old friendship" between Manafort and Deripaska. In May, he tells the Senate Intelligence Committee in writing that he met with Oganov to discuss the Pericles lawsuit. On September 11, 2018, he denies the meeting to Mueller's team, but eventually admits to it, again stating it was about Pericles.
  - Prince contacts Bannon's personal assistant Alexandra Preate to set up a meeting with Bannon to discuss the Seychelles trip.
  - The Washington Post reveals Flynn's phone calls with Kislyak. Priebus tells Flynn the "boss" wants the story killed. Flynn has McFarland tell the Post that there were no discussions of sanctions in the calls. The Post updates the story to add a denial by a "Trump official."
- January 13:
  - President-elect Trump nominates U.S. Attorney Rod Rosenstein as Deputy Attorney General.
  - Sean Spicer claims in a press conference that Flynn had only one call with Kislyak, about setting up a call between Trump and Putin. Emails from December show Spicer most likely knew Flynn discussed sanctions with Kislyak on December 29, 2016, and may have known about the purpose of the call in advance.
  - Waldman visits Assange for the second time.
  - K. T. McFarland insists to a reporter at The Washington Post that Flynn and Kislyak did not discuss sanctions and only spoke with each other prior to December 29. The statement contradicts emails between herself and Flynn.
  - The Senate Intelligence Committee announces it will investigate Russian cyberattacks, meddling in the election, and "intelligence regarding links between Russia and individuals associated with political campaigns."
- January 15:
  - Interviewed on CBS's Face the Nation and Fox News Sunday, Vice President-elect Pence repeatedly denies any connection between the Trump campaign team and Russians. He also denies Flynn discussed sanctions with Kislyak. Priebus makes similar claims on Meet The Press, and also alleges the DNC colluded with Ukraine to interfere in the 2016 election.
  - Manafort emails McFarland, copying Flynn, about "some important information I want to share that I picked up on my travels over the last month." Flynn advises McFarland not to respond. In 2018, Manafort tells Mueller's team that he was referring to Cuba, which he had visited along with other countries at the time, and not Russia or Ukraine.
  - Prince again contacts Preate to arrange a meeting with Bannon about the Seychelles trip.
- January 16:
  - Anthony Scaramucci, then a member of the Trump transition team, meets Dmitriev at the World Economic Forum in Davos. They discuss possible joint investments with the Russian Direct Investment Fund, which is under U.S. sanctions.
  - Dmitriev sends Gerson a two-page document consolidating the U.S.-Russia reconciliation ideas they had discussed.
- Mid January: Prince meets with Bannon to brief him on Dmitriev and their meetings in the Seychelles. In 2018, Prince tells Mueller's team that Bannon seemed disinterested. Later in 2018, Bannon tells Mueller's team that he didn't remember discussing Dmitriev with Prince, and that he would have disapproved of the Seychelles meeting if he had known about it. Mueller's team is unable to resolve the conflicting accounts beyond the text messages Prince sent to Preate, and neither Bannon nor Prince can explain why they did not retain any text messages prior to March 2017 even though they texted frequently according to phone records.
- January 17:
  - Sessions states in writing that he has not been "in contact with anyone connected to any part of the Russian government about the 2016 election." Sessions had been accused of failing to disclose two meetings with Kislyak.
  - Leonard Blavatnik, Sergei Kislyak, and Russian-American president of IMG Artists Alexander Shustorovich attend the Chairman's Global Dinner, an invitation-only inaugural event. Other attendees include Michael Flynn, Manafort, Bannon, and Nix. Blavatnik and Shustorovich donated $1 million each to the Trump inaugural fund. Shustorovich is a longtime business partner of Vekselberg, and, nearly 20 years earlier, the Republican National Committee returned his six-figure donation because of his past ties to the Russian government.
- January 17–20: Dmitriev circulates a memo at the World Economic Forum in Davos that describes his discussions with Prince in the Seychelles on January 11.
- January 18:
  - Jared Kushner files his security clearance application without listing his meetings with Russians.
  - The Daily Sabah reports a breakfast event occurred at the Trump International Hotel Washington, D.C., with about 60 invitees, including Nunes, Flynn, and foreign officials. The Daily Beast reports in January 2019 Mueller is investigating whether foreigners contributed money to the Trump inaugural fund and PAC through American intermediaries.
  - Dmitriev tells Gerson that Bannon asked Prince to meet with him and they had a positive meeting.
  - Gerson gives Dmitriev's reconciliation document to Kushner and explains who Dmitriev is. Kushner passes the document on to Bannon and Tillerson. In April 2018, Kushner tells Mueller's team that they never followed up on the document.
- January 18/19: McClatchy and The New York Times report that Manafort, Page and Stone have been under investigation by the FBI, NSA, CIA, and FinCEN, based on intercepted Russian communications and financial transactions. Sources say "the investigators have accelerated their efforts in recent weeks but have found no conclusive evidence of wrongdoing."
- January 19:
  - Senators Elizabeth Warren and Ben Cardin send Treasury Secretary-Designate Steve Mnuchin a letter asking him to commit to investigating Scaramucci for possibly violating U.S. sanctions on the Russian Direct Investment Fund during his January 16 meeting with Dmitriev in Davos. On May 12, in response to a follow-up query, the Treasury Department informs Warren her letter was forwarded to the Office of Foreign Assets Control.
  - Vekselberg and Intrater meet Cohen for a second time at the Candlelight Dinner, an event for $1 million donors to Trump's inaugural fund. They are seated together with Cohen's family. Days later, Columbus Nova awards Cohen a $1 million consulting contract.
  - Billionaire Leonard Blavatnik and Kazakh oligarch Alexander Mashkevitch attend the Candlelight Dinner. They qualified for tickets to the event by donating $1 million each to the Trump inaugural fund.
  - In December 2018, it is reported at least 16 Trump associates interacted with Russian nationals during the 2016 campaign and post-election transition, including Papadopoulos, Manafort, Gates, Flynn, Page, Sessions, Gordon, Caputo, Sater, Cohen, Prince, Stone, Ivanka Trump, Trump Jr., Kushner, and Kushner aide Avi Berkowitz.
  - Dmitriev gives his reconciliation document to Nader. He tells Nader, "[it is] a view from our side that I discussed in my meeting on the [Seychelles] islands and with you and with our friends. Please share with them - we believe this is a good foundation to start from."
- January 20: Obama leaves office. See Timeline of the presidency of Donald Trump.

== Investigations' continuing timelines ==
- Timeline of investigations into Donald Trump and Russia (January–June 2018)
- Timeline of investigations into Donald Trump and Russia (July–December 2018)
- Timeline of investigations into Donald Trump and Russia (January–June 2019)
- Timeline of investigations into Donald Trump and Russia (July–December 2019)
- Timeline of investigations into Donald Trump and Russia (2020–2021)

== See also ==
- Cyberwarfare by Russia
- Russian interference in the 2016 Brexit referendum
- Timelines related to Donald Trump and Russian interference in United States elections
- Trump–Ukraine scandal
