= Timelines related to Donald Trump and Russian interference in United States elections =

All the Trump Russia timelines

This is a list of timelines related to Donald Trump and Russian interference in United States elections that include investigations into links between Trump associates and Russian officials, as well as Russian interference in the 2016 elections that was "sweeping and systematic" and "violated U.S. criminal law".

The interactions continued throughout Trump's campaign and were identified by the FBI, Special counsel and several United States congressional committees in the course of their investigations into the Russian interference. Several persons connected to the Trump campaign made false statements about those links and obstructed investigations. Timelines cover events during the campaign, all the way to election day on November 8, 2016.

Events and investigations also occurred during the presidential transition from November 9, 2016, to January 20, 2017, and continued through the first and second halves of 2017; the first and second halves of 2018, first and second halves of 2019, 2020, and 2021, largely as parts of the Crossfire Hurricane FBI investigation, the Special Counsel investigation, multiple ongoing criminal investigations by several State Attorneys General, and the investigation resulting in the Inspector General report on FBI and DOJ actions in the 2016 election.

== Timelines ==
=== Russian interference, 1977-2024 ===
- Timeline of Russian interference in the 2016 United States elections: Pre-history (1977–June 12, 2016); Start of the presidential campaign (June 16, 2016 – June 29, 2016)
- Topical timeline of Russian interference in the 2016 United States elections: Complete topical timeline
- Timeline of Russian interference in the 2016 United States elections (July 2016–election day): July 2016–Nov. 8, 2016
- Timeline of post-election transition following Russian interference in the 2016 United States elections: November 9, 2016 – January 20, 2017
- Russian interference in the 2018 United States elections
- Russian interference in the 2020 United States elections
- Russian interference in the 2024 United States elections

=== Investigations, 2017-2021 ===
- Timeline of investigations into Donald Trump and Russia (January–June 2017)
- Timeline of investigations into Donald Trump and Russia (July–December 2017)
- Timeline of investigations into Donald Trump and Russia (January–June 2018)
- Timeline of investigations into Donald Trump and Russia (July–December 2018)
- Timeline of investigations into Donald Trump and Russia (January–June 2019)
- Timeline of investigations into Donald Trump and Russia (July–December 2019)
- Timeline of investigations into Donald Trump and Russia (2020–2022)

== Related investigations ==
- Crossfire Hurricane (FBI investigation)
- Durham Special counsel investigation
- Inspector General report on FBI and DOJ actions in the 2016 election
- Mueller special counsel investigation
- Russia investigation origins conspiracy theory

== See also ==
- Assessing Russian Activities and Intentions in Recent US Elections intelligence report
- Business projects of Donald Trump in Russia § Timeline of Trump businesses related to Russia
- Cyberwarfare by Russia
- Donald Trump's disclosure of classified information to Russia
- Efforts to impeach Donald Trump
- Foreign electoral intervention
- Propaganda in the Russian Federation
- Russian espionage in the United States
- Russian interference in the 2016 Brexit referendum
- Social media in the 2016 United States presidential election
- Timeline of the Donald Trump presidency
