= Ellen Nakashima =

American journalist

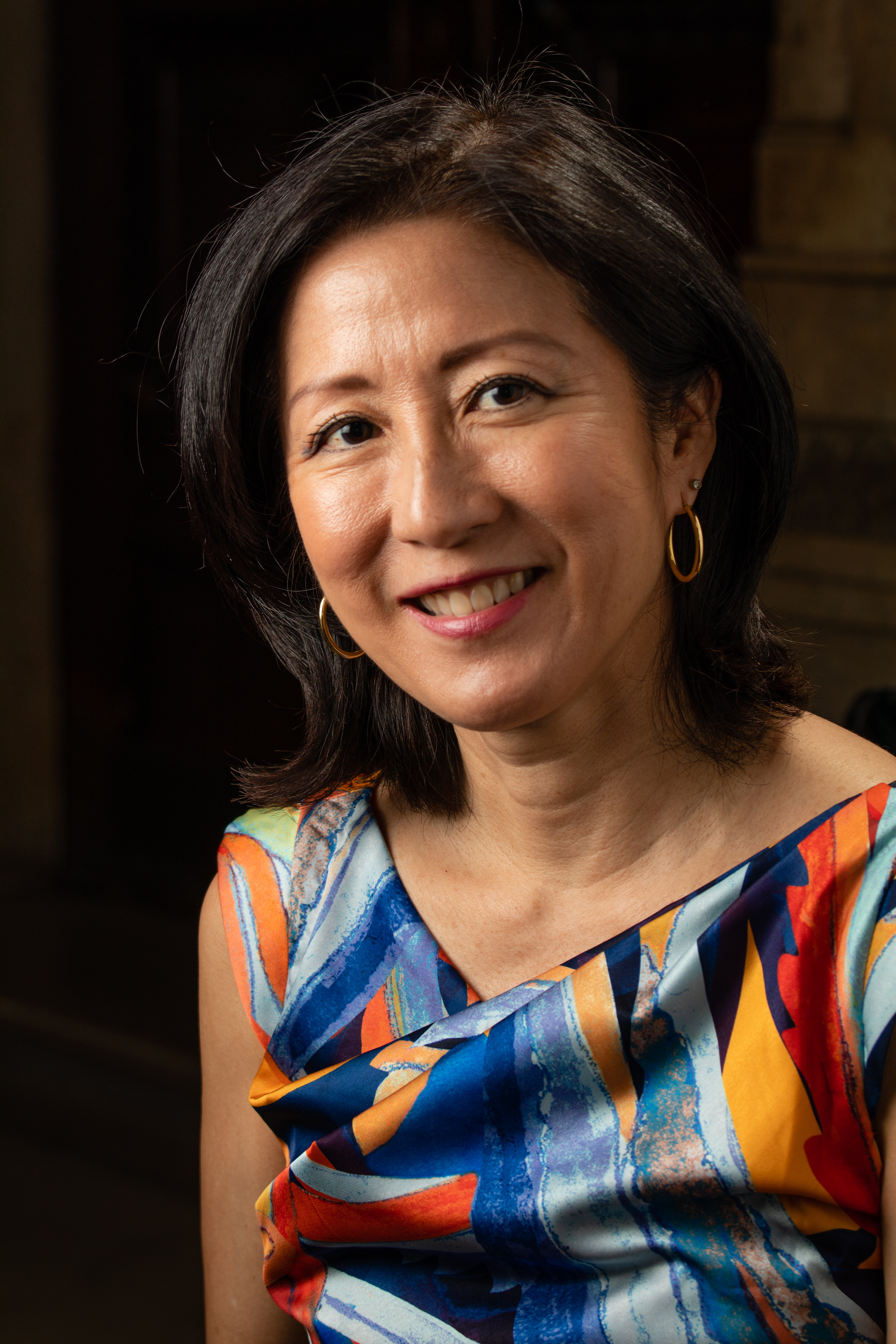
- Nakashima in 2018
- Education: University of California, Berkeley (BA); City, University of London
- Occupation: Journalist
- Awards: Gerald Loeb Award (2014); Pulitzer Prize for Public Service (2014); Pulitzer Prize for National Reporting (2018)

Ellen Nakashima is an American journalist who covers national security for The Washington Post. She is a 2014 and 2018 recipient of the Pulitzer Prize.

== Education ==
Nakashima received a B.A. in humanities from University of California, Berkeley, in 1984 before completing a master's degree in International Journalism from City University in London.

== Career ==
Nakashima began her journalism career at The Hartford Courant and The Quincy Patriot Ledger, before joining The Washington Post as a reporter in 1995. She has since served as a White House reporter, South-East Asia correspondent and a privacy and technology reporter until she started covering national security in 2009.

== Awards and recognitions ==
Nakashima has won a series of awards and investitures for her work at The Post. In 2014, she won the Gerald Loeb Award and the Pulitzer Prize for Public Service, while in 2017, she was named Alumna of the Year by the Daily Californian Alumni Association. She reported on Russian efforts to influence the outcome of the 2016 presidential election and contacts between aides to President Trump and Russian officials, work which earned her and her colleagues a Pulitzer Prize for National Reporting in 2018.

On 10 April 2024, Nakashima was among the guests invited to the state dinner hosted by U.S. President Joe Biden in honor of Prime Minister Fumio Kishida at the White House.
