= Oleg Erovinkin =

Russian intelligence officer

- Оле́г Алекса́ндрович Еровинкин
- Born: Oleg Aleksandrovich Erovinkin c. 1955; Soviet Union
- Died: 26 December 2016 (age 61); Moscow, Russia
- Education: FSB Academy
- Occupation: Intelligence officer
- Years active: 1976–2016
- Organization: Rosneft
- Known for: Connection to Steele dossier

Oleg Alexandrovich Erovinkin (Russian: Оле́г Алекса́ндрович Еровинкин; c. 1955 – 26 December 2016) was a Russian intelligence officer. He was a general in both the KGB and FSB. Erovinkin served as chief of staff at Russian state-owned oil company Rosneft.

== Early life and education ==
Erovinkin was born c. 1955. He began serving with the KGB in 1976 and graduated from the Dzerzhynsky Higher School of the KGB in 1980.

== Career ==
In 1994, under Russian president Boris Yeltsin, Erovinkin was positioned as deputy head of personnel for the protection of state secrets. Erovinkin was appointed chief of staff for Rosneft by Vladimir Putin in May 2008. Under Putin, Erovinkin was a key aide to Deputy Prime Minister Igor Sechin and acted as a key liaison between Sechin and Putin. Erovinkin worked in a department of Rosneft that handles classified documents, receiving and forwarding them to other agencies. He prepared personal declarations of Sechin's assets and property for the government. In May 2012, Erovinkin worked for Rosneft and headed Sechin's office for a short time in late 2012.

== Death and investigation ==
On 26 December 2016, Erovinkin was found dead in the back of his car in Moscow. He was 61 years old. While no cause of death was announced, local media sources reported that foul play was suspected. The morgue reported no cause of death (although Erovinkin's last employer, Rosneft, claimed he died of a heart attack). His death was to be investigated by FSB officials.

Because of his similarity to dossier Source B, who was "a former top level intelligence officer still active in the Kremlin", described as "Sechin's treasurer", media sources speculated that Erovinkin was an unnamed informant for the Steele dossier, a document compiled by former MI6 spy Christopher Steele detailing connections between Donald Trump's presidential campaign and Russian agents. The dossier describes a "close associate" of Rosneft president Sechin as a source, and the media have speculated that Erovinkin was that source.

Steele responded to the reports of Erovinkin's death and said that, although much of his information came from a source close to Sechin, he denied that Erovinkin was a source. In interviews with Luke Harding, "Steele was adamant that Erovinkin wasn't his source and 'not one of ours.' As a person close to Steele put it to me: 'Sometimes people just die.'" Glenn Simpson has also said he knows of no sources who have been harmed physically. Sources have noted that Erovinkin was a key liaison between Sechin and Putin, serving as chief of staff at Russian state-owned oil company Rosneft, the same company associated with dossier allegations about Carter Page and the lifting of sanctions by Trump. Those allegations came from a source. Erovinkin was "Sechin's closest associate", and to Putin, who was looking for leakers, he "was at least a person of interest".

According to Christo Grozev, a journalist at Risk Management Lab, a think tank based in Bulgaria, the circumstances of Erovinkin's death were "mysterious". Grozev suspected Erovinkin helped Steele compile the dossier on Trump and suggests the hypothesis that the death may have been part of a cover-up by the Russian government. Experts expressed skepticism about the theory: "As a rule, people like Gen Yerovinkin don't tend to die in airport thriller murders," said Mark Galeotti, an expert on the Russian security services.
