= Igor Danchenko =

Russian Eurasia analyst (born 1978)

- Игорь Юрьевич Данченко
- Born: Igor Yurievich Danchenko; May 5, 1978 (age 48)
- Other name: Iggy Danchenko
- Citizenship: Russia; Soviet Union (until 1991)
- Occupation: Analyst
- Known for: Primary sub-source for the Steele dossier
- Children: 1

Igor Yurievich Danchenko (born May 5, 1978) is a Russian citizen and U.S. resident currently residing in Virginia who works as a Eurasia political risk, defense and economics analyst. Together with Clifford Gaddy he analyzed Vladimir Putin's 1996 university dissertation and presented examples of plagiarism. In July 2020, Danchenko was revealed to have worked for Christopher Steele's Orbis Business Intelligence as a source for the discredited Steele dossier. In November 2021, he was indicted on charges of lying to the FBI about the identities of his sources but "not about the information [in the dossier] itself". He was acquitted of all charges in October 2022.

== Education ==
Danchenko grew up in Perm Oblast, Russia, the son of an eye surgeon and an engineer who worked on the Soviet space program. He attended an elite English-language school where students aspired to work in Soviet foreign affairs. At 16, Danchenko participated in a student-exchange trip to England; he later joined a yearlong exchange program and graduated from high school near New Orleans.

Danchenko graduated from the Law Faculty of Perm State University and the Department of Political Science at the University of Louisville in Kentucky, United States. While working at the Brookings Institution, Danchenko earned a master's degree from Georgetown University. From 2006 to 2009 he attended the CERES (Center for Eurasian, Russian and East European Studies) program at the Walsh School of Foreign Service there.

== Career ==
Early in his career, Danchenko worked at Lukoil subsidiary Permtex in Perm and at UralSubSoetStroy in Iran. Between 1999 and 2005, he was a facilitator for the Open World Russian Leadership Program, US Library of Congress and a leader for senior Russian federal and regional delegations to the US. From 2003 to 2005, Danchenko worked as a graduate teaching assistant at the University of Louisville.

Danchenko worked at the Brookings Institution from 2005 to 2010. While there, Danchenko worked closely with Fiona Hill. In 2010, Danchenko, Hill and Erica Downs co-authored a paper called "One Step Forward, Two Steps Back? The Realities of a Rising China and Implications for Russia’s Energy Ambitions". Hill introduced Danchenko to Christopher Steele and to U.S.-based public-relations executive Charles Dolan Jr., who would later become one of Danchenko's sources for the Steele dossier.

Since 2010, Danchenko has been an analyst on political risk and business intelligence, managing projects on Russia and Eurasia. Danchenko has been quoted by media outlets on topics ranging from energy politics to defense matters.

=== Putin plagiarism accusations ===
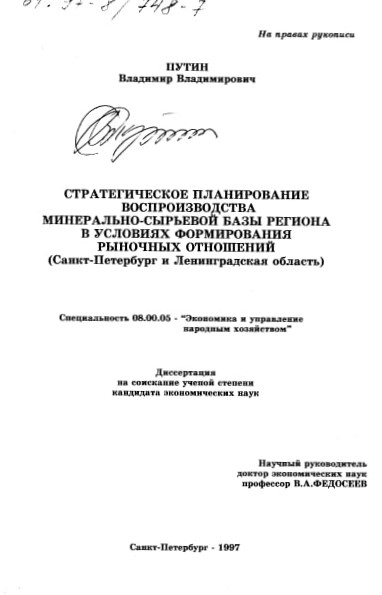
Title page of Putin's 1997 PhD dissertation in Russian Strategic planning of reproduction of the mineral resource base of the region in the context of the formation of market relations (Sтратегичеткое планирование...), Saint Petersburg.

Danchenko first made the news alongside his Brookings Institution colleague, Cliff Gaddy, when they obtained a copy of the previously inaccessible 218-page dissertation of Vladimir Putin entitled The Strategic Planning of Regional Resources Under the Formation of Market Relations, which he defended at the St. Petersburg Mining Institute in 1996. Danchenko and Gaddy revealed their findings on March 30, 2006, at a Brookings Institution event, where they discussed the dissertation's relevance to Putin's views on governance and the economy. They also presented evidence of extensive plagiarism in the dissertation, including a translation of a 1978 textbook. The Russian dissertation committee disputed their accusations.

== Early FBI investigation and contact with Russian intelligence officers ==
In May 2009, the FBI opened a preliminary investigation into Danchenko after he had reportedly told two associates from the Brookings Institution that he knew of a way they could "make a little extra money” if they were able to "get a job in the government and had access to classified information.” The investigation was upgraded from preliminary to full once further information revealed that Danchenko had prior contacts with Russian intelligence officers in 2005 and 2006. The FBI's investigation into Danchenko was closed in March 2011 after FBI agents mistakenly believed he had fled the country.

== Source for Steele dossier ==
In September 2020, a declassified FBI summary revealed that Danchenko had been identified by the FBI as Christopher Steele's Primary Sub-Source in December 2016.

Beginning in March 2016, Danchenko was tasked by Christopher Steele to investigate Paul Manafort, as well as Donald Trump, Sergei Ivanov, Carter Page, and Michael Cohen. Some parts of the information contributed by Danchenko became part of the FBI's foreign intelligence surveillance warrants on Carter Page. One of Danchenko's primary sources for information about the alleged collusion between the Donald Trump 2016 presidential campaign and the Russian government was allegedly Olga Galkina, a Russian public-relations executive and former parliamentary correspondent for RIA Novosti.

According to the Durham indictment, Galkina told Dolan in emails that she was a "big Hillary fan" and hoped to obtain a State Department position if Clinton won the election. Galkina, a longtime friend of Danchenko, has denied being one of his sources. Other information was alleged to have come from Charles Dolan Jr., who was "a longtime participant in Democratic Party politics".

On December 20, 2016, Danchenko was personally identified as Steele's Primary Sub-source by FBI supervisory intelligence analyst, Brian Auten.

In January 2017, shortly after BuzzFeed News published the Steele dossier, Danchenko was contacted by the FBI for an interview. About a week and a half later, in exchange for legal immunity, he agreed to answer questions about his working relationship with Steele, as well as his opinion on the accuracy of the Steele dossier. During the three-day interview, Danchenko told FBI agents that his contributions to the dossier consisted of unverified rumors and speculation which he could not corroborate. In March 2017, the FBI signed up Danchenko to be a paid confidential informant; the relationship was terminated by the FBI in October 2020 after paying Danchenko over $200,000.

The FBI leadership found that Danchenko was "truthful and cooperative" but rank and file agents did not agree. The FBI's Supervisory Intel Analyst said that "it was his impression that the Primary Sub-source may not have been 'completely truthful' and may have been minimizing certain aspects of what he/she told Steele". He also "believed that there were instances where the Primary Sub-source was 'minimizing' certain facts but did not believe that he/she was 'completely fabricating' events". He added that he "did not know whether he could support a 'blanket statement' that the Primary Sub-source had been truthful".

In July 2020, Senator Lindsey Graham, Republican of South Carolina, who chaired the Judiciary Committee, released a 59-page, redacted FBI summary of the FBI's interview with Danchenko, while referring to the entire Russia investigation as "corrupt". In the FBI summary, Danchenko was referred to anonymously as the "Primary Subsource" for the Steele Dossier. Shortly after the release of the summary, Danchenko was identified online as the "Primary Subsource"; he was named in a newly created blog; the blog post was then promoted by a pseudonymous Twitter account created two months earlier, and the identity of Danchenko was amplified by RT, the English-language Kremlin propaganda outlet. Former FBI officials, such as James W. McJunkin, formerly the Bureau's assistant director for counterterrorism, said that the release of information that outed Danchenko would make it more difficult for the FBI to gain the trust of potential sources.

== Durham investigation, trial and acquittal ==
In December 2020, Special Counsel John Durham subpoenaed the Brookings Institution for Danchenko's personnel files. In November 2021, Danchenko was arrested in connection with the John Durham investigation and was charged with five counts of making false statements to the FBI on five different occasions (between March 2017 and November 2017) regarding the sources of material he provided for the Steele dossier. This includes Danchenko having allegedly obscured his relationship with Charles Dolan Jr. and having allegedly fabricated contacts with Sergei Millian. Danchenko pleaded not guilty to all charges.

Columnist and attorney Andrew C. McCarthy reacted to what he described as the "if not irrational, then exaggerated" reactions by Trump supporters to these reports of arrests. He urged them to be cautious as Durham's indictments "narrowly allege that the defendants lied to the FBI only about the identity or status of people from whom they were getting information, not about the information itself."

Danchenko's trial began on October 11, 2022. U.S. District Judge Anthony Trenga deemed one of the five charges had insufficient evidence to proceed. Following the trial, the jury deliberated for one day before acquitting Danchenko of the other four charges on October 18, 2022. The case represented the second indictment in Durham's probe to go to trial and the second not-guilty verdict.

== Value as FBI source ==
During his trial, two FBI officials revealed Danchenko was "an uncommonly valuable" CHS for several years whose role went far beyond the Steele dossier, and that his reports were used in 25 investigations and 40 intelligence reports between 2017 and 2020. FBI Special Agent Kevin Helson, Danchenko's handler, testified that Danchenko was considered "a model" informant who "reshaped the way the U.S. even perceives threats," and that losing him as a source "harmed national security".

Helson testified that Danchenko's reports as a confidential informant were used by the FBI in 25 investigations and 40 intelligence reports during a nearly four-year period from March 2017 to October 2020. ... Danchenko, the FBI agent said, was considered 'a model' informant and 'reshaped the way the U.S. even perceives threats.' Helson said that none of his previous informants had ever had as many sub-sources as Danchenko and that others at the FBI have continued to ask in recent months for Danchenko's assistance amid Russia's invasion of Ukraine.
