= Sergei Millian =

American businessman (born 1978)

- Born: Siarhei Kukuts; October 22, 1978 (age 48); Belarus
- Other names: Sergio Millian, Sergey Kukuts, and Sarhei Kukuts
- Education: Minsk State Linguistic University
- Occupation: Businessman
- Website: sergeimillian.com

Sergei Millian (born Siarhei Kukuts; October 22, 1978) is a Belarusian-American businessman and former president of the Russian-American Chamber of Commerce. He has claimed association with Donald Trump and members of Trump's 2016 election campaign, and he was alleged to have been a source for the Steele dossier. Millian had denied being a source.

In November 2021, after the indictment of Steele's primary subsource Igor Danchenko for allegedly lying to the FBI about the sources he used in compiling claims for the dossier, The Washington Post corrected and removed large portions of their previous articles that had identified Millian as a source. Danchenko was acquitted of all charges in October 2022.

== Life in America ==
In 2001, Millian moved to the United States, and in May 2006, he formed the Russian-American Chamber of Commerce in Atlanta.

In January 2016, Millian stated that the Russian-American Chamber of Commerce has about 200 businesses and most of them are in the United States.

Millian has also worked as a translator and interpreter, including for clients such as the Russian Ministry of Foreign Affairs. He has claimed to have "high-level contacts in the Russian government" but denied that he was affiliated with Russian intelligence services.

In 2007, Millian met Donald Trump and Jorge Pérez at a horse racing event in Miami, and he has claimed that Donald Trump then introduced him to Michael Cohen. Afterward, he reportedly signed a contract with the Trump Organization and The Related Group to market properties at Trump Hollywood via a brokerage company, Richard Bowers & Co. Millian also claimed to be the "exclusive broker" for Trump Organization properties in the former Soviet Union. Trump Hollywood has stated that they have no record of any signed agreement with Millian; Michael Cohen has also denied meeting Millian and said that Millian had no substantive relationship with Trump or his company.

== Trump 2016 presidential campaign ==
During Donald Trump's 2016 presidential campaign, Millian began months-long outreach to Trump's onetime foreign policy advisor, George Papadopoulos. In an August 2016 Facebook message, he offered to supply Papadopoulos with a "disruptive technology that might be instrumental in [his] political work for the campaign." Papadopolous told investigators for the Mueller report that he had no memory of the matter. Millian also offered Papadopoulos a consulting contract to work simultaneously for Trump and an unidentified Russian, which Papadopoulos declined.

== Alleged connection to the Steele dossier ==
=== Allegations that Millian was a source ===
Millian was reportedly identified as Sources D and E in the Steele dossier and later as "Person 1" in the Inspector General's report. As an alleged source, Millian was said to have shared key information with a compatriot (later identified as Steele's primary subsource, Russian analyst Igor Danchenko), who then shared it with Christopher Steele. Millian has denied being a source for any material in the dossier, and he has reportedly refused to cooperate with investigators for the Mueller report. According to Christopher Steele, Danchenko told him he met with Millian in 2016 on three different occasions at restaurants in Washington DC, New York City, and Charleston, South Carolina. However, Danchenko told the FBI that he never met Millian, but only spoke on the telephone with someone who he believed was Millian. Danchenko was indicted by John Durham in November 2021 (and later acquitted) for allegedly having fabricated this telephone conversation with Millian, and The Washington Post later corrected and removed large portions of their previous articles that had identified Millian as a key source of the Steele dossier.

In October 2022, judge Anthony Trenga cast doubt on Millian and two 2020 emails he wrote denying he talked to Danchenko: The "emails lack the necessary 'guarantees of trustworthiness' as the government does not offer direct evidence that Millian actually wrote the emails, and, even if he did, Millian possessed opportunity and motive to fabricate and/or misrepresent his thoughts."

=== Claims allegedly made by Millian in the dossier ===
Source E (in September 2022, reported to have been Bernd Kuhlen, a German citizen who does not speak Russian) and Source D were reported as the sources behind multiple allegations in the Steele dossier, including the alleged prostitution ("pee tape") incident at the Ritz-Carlton Hotel Moscow. According to the founders of Fusion GPS, seven Russian sources told Steele about this incident. According to the dossier, these included Sources D and E and others in Steele's "alphabet list of assets". Media reports in November 2021, however, suggest that the dossier's claims about prostitutes in Moscow did not originate from Millian, but from Charles Dolan Jr., who was "a longtime participant in Democratic Party politics".

Source E was also alleged to have admitted to "a well-developed conspiracy of cooperation between [the Trump campaign] and the Russian leadership...managed for Trump by former campaign chairman Paul Manafort", that included "moles in the Democratic Party" and coordinated cyber-attacks such as the 2016 Democratic National Committee email leak. This was alleged to have the objectives of swinging supporters of Bernie Sanders away from Hillary Clinton and toward Donald Trump, weakening Clinton and bolstering Trump. In return for this assistance, Source E alleged that the Trump team had agreed to "sideline Russian intervention in Ukraine as a campaign issue and to raise US/NATO defense commitments in the Baltic and Eastern Europe to deflect attention away from Ukraine." Source E was also alleged to have said that the Trump camp became angry and resentful toward Putin when they realized he not only was aiming to weaken Clinton and bolster Trump, but was attempting to "undermine the US government and democratic system more generally".

Some of the claims in the dossier allegedly made by Source E became part of the FBI's foreign intelligence surveillance warrants on Carter Page.

== Work for the FBI ==
Millian was a confidential human source for the FBI field office in Atlanta from September 2007 to March 2011.

== FBI counterintelligence investigation ==
In August 2016, the FBI opened a counterintelligence case on Millian to determine if he had been "directed to engage in activities related to Russian Government efforts to interfere in the 2016 U.S. Presidential Election." In January 2019, the case was ultimately closed.

== Recognition ==
In January 2015, Millian received the Silver Archer Award in the category of "Persona," considered to be the most prestigious, for his efforts to attract investments to Russia, which were estimated to be around $500 million (~$663 million in 2025).
