= Douglas Letter =

American lawyer (born 1953)

Doug Letter
- Born: Douglas Neal Letter; September 27, 1953 (age 72)
- Education: Columbia University (BA); University of California, Berkeley (JD)

Douglas Neal Letter is an American attorney. He was general counsel to the United States House of Representatives from 2018 to 2022. He is now chief legal officer for Brady: United Against Gun Violence. From 1978 to 2018, he was an attorney in the United States Department of Justice, ultimately serving as director of the appellate staff for the Civil Division.

During a 2014 hearing before a federal court in which Letter was representing the United States Government in a lawsuit brought by the Electronic Frontier Foundation, he made headlines after providing erroneous information to judges regarding the legality of National Security Letters. The Justice Department later issued a written apology to the court for Letter's statement.

Letter received his undergraduate degree from Columbia University in 1975 and his J.D. from UC Berkeley School of Law in 1978.

== See also ==
- Timeline of investigations into Trump and Russia (2019–2020)
