= Russian interference in the 2018 United States elections =

Worldwide Threat Assessment that states Russia was targeting the 2018 U.S. elections

The United States Intelligence Community concluded in early 2018 that the Russian government was continuing the interference it started during the 2016 elections and was attempting to influence the 2018 United States mid-term elections by generating discord through social media. Primaries for candidates of parties began in some states in March and would continue through September. The leaders of intelligence agencies have noted that Russia was spreading disinformation through fake social media accounts in order to divide American society and foster anti-Americanism.

In 2022, it was reported that a Federal Election Commission investigation had found that American Ethane Company, which had received investments from Russian oligarchs, had contributed Russian money to U.S. political candidates in the 2018 midterm elections, largely in Louisiana. FEC commissioners Ellen Weintraub and Shana M. Broussard criticized the Republicans in the FEC for a "slap on the wrist" civil penalty.

== Timeline ==
=== February ===
In February 2018 Director of National Intelligence Dan Coats claimed during a congressional testimony that "the United States is under attack" from Russian authorities. As of February 13, 2018, six U.S. intelligence agencies unanimously assessed that Russian hackers were observing American electoral systems and using social media bots to promote partisan causes. Previously, Secretary of State Rex Tillerson also warned that Russia was interfering in the 2018 midterm election.

In testimony before the Senate Intelligence Committee on February 13, Coats noted that voting in some elections will begin as early as March 2018 for primaries. He stated: "We need to inform the American public that this is real, that this is going to happen." At the same hearing, CIA Director Mike Pompeo told the committee that Russia has already been observed engaging in such tactics.

=== March ===
During a press conference in the White House on March 6, 2018, President Trump was questioned on the topic of possible interference in the upcoming midterm election, responding “We won’t allow that to happen. We’re doing a very, very deep study, and we’re coming out with, I think, some very strong suggestions on the ’18 election," adding, “we’ll counteract whatever they do.”

=== April ===
The National Republican Congressional Committee (NRCC) discovers that the email accounts of four senior officials have been hacked and monitored for months by a probable foreign agent. The hack was kept secret, even from the GOP leadership, until the NRCC was contacted for a December story by Politico.

April 23, 2018, saw a report of a possible Russian hack of the website for state senate candidate Kendall Scudder, a Dallas Democratic candidate. The hack attempted to redirect visitors to another site, and included text in Russian. The incident was reported to the FBI.

=== May ===
On May 23, 2018, United States Secretary of State Mike Pompeo, in a committee hearing, warned that the US government was not protected from Russian interference in the 2018 midterms elections, saying, "No responsible government official would ever state that they have done enough to forestall any attack on the United States of America".

=== July ===
On July 10, 2018, the Utah State Elections Director Justin Lee reported that the registration database in Utah recorded a huge uptick in hack attempts, upwards of one billion attempts per day (12,000/second) were seen after Mitt Romney announced his return to campaign for the Senate. Romney's views of Russia as the United States' "biggest geopolitical threat," were widely panned in the 2012 US presidential campaign, but mark him as one of few outspoken Republican opponents of Russian threats.

A July 15 Business Insider article revealed a new Russian intelligence-linked "news" site, USAReally, which follows in the footsteps of previous Russian IRA-backed troll farms, and appears to be an attempt to "test the waters" ahead of the mid-terms.

On July 17, commentator David A. Love said that the WalkAway social media campaign, originally created by New York resident Brandon Straka, had been co-opted by Russian bots in an attempt to discourage Democrats from voting in the mid-term elections, citing Hamilton 68. He cited the #WalkAway hashtag as an example of astroturfing.

On July 20, Microsoft VP for Customer Security and Trust revealed at the Aspen Security Forum in Aspen, Colorado that Russian hackers had already specifically targeted three Congressional candidates running in the 2018 mid-term elections, using sophisticated spearphishing techniques spoofing a Microsoft website.

On July 26, Missouri's Democratic senator Claire McCaskill revealed that Russian hackers attempted to break into her Senate email account unsuccessfully, confirming a report in The Daily Beast.

On July 31, Facebook announced they had detected and removed 32 pages and fake accounts being used for "coordinated inauthentic behavior," and was "working with the Federal Bureau of Investigation and other intelligence agencies".

=== August ===
On August 2, 2018, the Director of National Intelligence, Dan Coats announced along with FBI Director Christopher A. Wray at a White House press conference that Russia is actively interfering in the 2018 elections, saying "It is real. It is ongoing." At the same time, NPR reported that Democratic senator Jeanne Shaheen reported to the FBI several attempts to compromise her campaign including both spearphishing attempts on her staff, and a disturbing incident where someone called her offices "impersonating a Latvian official, trying to set up a meeting to talk to me about Russian sanctions and about Ukraine." Her opposition to Russian aggression and support of sanctions has placed her on an official Russian blacklist.

On August 6, Democratic candidate Tabitha Isner, running for Alabama's 2nd congressional district, reported 1,300+ unsuccessful attempts to break into her campaign website from Russian sourced IP addresses, mostly happening between July 17–18, prompting additional website security measures.

On August 8, Florida Senator Bill Nelson told the Tampa Bay Times that Russian operatives have penetrated some of Florida's election systems ahead of the 2018 midterm elections. "They have already penetrated certain counties in the state and they now have free rein to move about," Nelson told the newspaper. He also stated that more detailed information is classified. The Russian hackers may be able to prevent some voters from casting votes by removing people from the voter rolls.

=== October ===
On October 19, the Department of Justice charged Russian accountant Elena Khusyaynova with attempting to interfere with the midterm elections. She was involved with handling the money for Internet Research Agency and related entities who had previously been charged with interfering in the 2016 elections.

=== November ===
On November 6, the 2018 US midterm elections took place.

=== December ===
On December 4, Politico reported that the email accounts of four senior officials at the National Republican Congressional Committee (NRCC) were hacked and monitored for months by a probable foreign agent. The hack was kept secret by the NRCC, even from the GOP leadership, until it was contacted by Politico for their story.

On December 22, Director of National Intelligence Dan Coats reported that there was no evidence of vote tampering, but influence operations had persisted. "The activity we did see was consistent with what we shared in the weeks leading up to the election. Russia, and other foreign countries, including China and Iran, conducted influence activities and messaging campaigns targeted at the United States to promote their strategic interests."

== See also ==
- Yevgeny Prigozhin
- Russian espionage in the United States
- Russian interference in the 2016 United States elections
- Russian interference in the 2020 United States elections
- Russian interference in the 2024 United States elections
- Social media in the United States presidential election, 2016
- Timeline of Russian interference in the 2016 United States elections
- Timelines related to Donald Trump and Russian interference in United States elections
