= Timeline of Russian interference in the 2016 United States elections =

This is a timeline of events related to Russian interference in the 2016 United States elections.

It includes events described in investigations into the myriad links between Trump associates and Russian officials until July 2016, with July 2016 through election day November 8, 2016, following. Events and investigations also occurred during the presidential transition from November 9, 2016, to January 20, 2017, and continued through the first and second halves of 2017; the first and second halves of 2018, 2019, 2020, and 2021, largely as parts of the Crossfire Hurricane FBI investigation, the Special Counsel investigation, multiple ongoing criminal investigations by several State Attorneys General, and the investigation resulting in the Inspector General report on FBI and DOJ actions in the 2016 election.

== Before Donald Trump's 2016 candidacy ==
=== 1977 ===
- According to former KGB major Yuri Shvets, Trump became the target of a joint Czech intelligence services and KGB spying operation after he married Czech model Ivana Zelnickova and was cultivated as an "asset" by Russian intelligence since 1977: "Russian intelligence gained an interest in Trump as far back as 1977, viewing Trump as an exploitable target."

=== 1986 ===
- Soviet Ambassador Yuri Dubinin invites Trump on an all-expenses-paid trip to the Soviet Union.

=== 1987 ===
- Konstantin Kilimnik attends the Military Institute of the Ministry of Defense from 1987 until 1992.
- July: Trump and his wife, Ivana, who spoke Russian, make their first visit to the Soviet Union (which included the Russian Soviet Federative Socialist Republic [RSFSR]). They scout potential construction sites for a Trump Tower Moscow.

=== 1991 ===
- December 26: Dissolution of the Soviet Union occurs, wherein the RSFSR becomes the Russian Federation (commonly known as "Russia").

=== 1996 ===
- Trump returns to Russia, visits Moscow with Howard Lorber and Bennett S. LeBow to scout potential properties for "skyscrapers and hotels", registers his trademark, and makes connections with the development company Bayrock Group (which would result in Trump Soho) and Felix Sater, who became crucial to later Trump Moscow talks. Trump subsequently announces a plan to invest $250 million in Russia and brand two luxury residential buildings in Moscow, which doesn't come to fruition. Other people on the trip include Leon Black of Apollo Global Management, Ron Bernstein, Theodore Liebman, and Matthew Calamari. During the trip, Trump brings two women he met the night before to a business meeting, and begins a long-term relationship with a former "Miss Moscow". In 2020, the Senate Intelligence Committee reports that it is unable to determine whether Russia has compromising material involving Trump and the three women.

=== 2000 ===
- February 14: Trump withdraws his bid for the Reform Party nomination in the 2000 United States presidential election, but writes that he cannot rule out another run for president. Roger Stone chaired Trump's exploratory committee.

=== 2001–2004 ===
- Patten and Kilimnik work together at the International Republican Institute (IRI). Patten runs the think tank's Moscow office and considers Kilimnik a key employee.

=== 2004 ===
- Manafort begins his relationship with his patron, Deripaska.
- November 22: The Orange Revolution begins, eventually resulting in a revote ordered by the Supreme Court of Ukraine.

=== 2005 ===
- Trump gives Bayrock Group an exclusive deal to build a Trump-branded property in Moscow.
- Kilimnik leaves the IRI to work for Manafort in Ukraine.
- June 23: Paul Manafort and a business partner, Rick Davis, propose a plan to Oleg Deripaska under which they would influence news coverage, business dealings, and politics in the former Soviet Union, Europe, and the United States "to benefit President Vladimir Putin's government". They eventually sign a $10 million contract that starts in 2006 using LOAV Ltd. instead of Davis-Manafort; they maintain a business relationship until at least 2009.

=== 2006 ===
- At Donald Trump's request, Sater accompanies Ivanka Trump and Donald Trump Jr. on a Moscow trip, and arranges for Ivanka to sit in Putin's office chair during a tour of the Kremlin.
- January: Davis introduces Senators John McCain, Saxby Chambliss, and John E. Sununu to Deripaska at the World Economic Forum in Davos. They meet at a private apartment and have dinner at Peter Munk's ski chalet. Later in the month, Deripaska sends Davis and Manafort a letter thanking Davis for arranging the meeting with the senators.

=== 2007 ===
- Manafort and Richard Davis found Pericles Emerging Markets, an investment fund solely backed by Deripaska.
- October 15: Trump praises Putin in an interview on CNN.
- 2007–2012: Manafort receives $12.7 million in undisclosed cash payments from Viktor Yanukovych's pro-Russian Ukrainian Party of Regions.
- November: Trump attends the Millionaire's Fair in Moscow, where he announces that Trump Vodka will expand its distribution into Russia, his first foray into the Russian market.
- November 20 Manafort receives his first payment from the Ukrainian Party of Regions.
- December 19: Trump sends Putin a congratulatory letter for being named Time magazine's "Man of the Year". He writes, "As you probably have heard, I am a big fan of yours!"

=== 2008 ===
- 2008:
  - Around 2008, Trump Jr. travels to Russia a half-dozen times in 18 months, looking for deals.
  - Deripaska transfers $18.9 million to Pericles Emerging Markets to purchase Black Sea Cable. It is unclear what happened to the money: Deripaska demands an accounting of the funds in 2013, sues Pericles in 2014, and sues Manafort in 2018.
  - A spokesperson for Deripaska denies he ever hired Manafort's consulting company.
- 2008–2013: Carter Page is an "operational contact" for the CIA, which means the agency can ask him for information he already knows but not task him with gathering information.
- July: Trump sells the Palm Beach estate Maison de L'Amitie to Russian oligarch Dmitry Rybolovlev for a record $95 million. Trump bought the property for $41.35 million three years earlier and made only minor improvements. According to Cohen, Trump later tells his associates that he believes Putin was behind Rybolovlev's purchase.
- September: Trump Jr., then an executive vice president of The Trump Organization, says, "Russians make up a pretty disproportionate cross-section of a lot of our assets, say, in Dubai, and certainly with our project in SoHo and anywhere in New York. We see a lot of money pouring in from Russia."
- November: Davis-Manafort is disbanded shortly after the presidential election.

=== 2009 ===
- May: Kislyak attempts to arrange a meeting between Torshin and Alaska Governor Sarah Palin during Torshin's planned visit to Alaska on June 6. Palin's office declines and suggests Torshin meet with Lieutenant Governor Sean Parnell. It is unclear whether the meeting took place.

=== 2010 ===
- The Trump International Hotel and Tower in Toronto receives timely financing from Vnesheconombank (VEB), a Russian state-run investment bank.
- Deripaska lends $10 million to a company jointly owned by Manafort and his wife.
- August: Trump and Bannon first meet, and David Bossie is present. Trump says he is thinking of running for president in 2012; Bannon replies, "for what country?"

=== 2011 ===
- Maria Butina founds the "Right to Bear Arms" organization.
- 2011–2013: Protests occur in Russia against its legislative and presidential election processes. Putin accuses U.S. Secretary of State Hillary Clinton of interfering in Russian politics.
- April 29 – May 1: Nashville lawyer G. Kline Preston IV and NRA Secretary Jim Land introduce Russian Senator Alexander Torshin to National Rifle Association (NRA) president David Keene at the NRA annual meeting in Pittsburgh.
- May 7: Keene sends Torshin a handwritten letter offering to help in his endeavors.

- October 12–27: Mueller resigns his family membership from the Trump National Golf Club in Sterling, Virginia, and asks for a refund of the unused portion of the annual fees. Two weeks later, the club confirms the membership will end on October 31 and says he will be put on a waitlist for fee refunds, but Mueller never receives the refund. Beginning in May 2017, Trump claims this incident forms a conflict of interest that should prevent Mueller from serving as the special counsel investigating him.
- December 8: Putin states that Clinton "set the tone for some opposition activists", and "gave them a signal, they heard this signal and started active work".

=== 2012 ===
- The FBI warns Representative Dana Rohrabacher that he is being targeted by Russian agents to recruit him as an "agent of influence"; that is, someone who can affect US policy.
- Italian MEP Gianni Pittella introduces Simona Mangiante, the future wife of George Papadopoulos, to Mifsud in Brussels. Mangiante worked for the European Parliament as an attorney specializing in child abduction cases.
- February 10: Torshin registers as a life member of the NRA using Russian diplomat Igor Matveev's address and Preston's phone number.
- April 12–15: Torshin attends the NRA annual convention in St. Louis, Missouri, with an "all access" pass.
- October 11: Preston applies for Torshin to receive election observer status in Tennessee.
- October 25: Manafort receives the last of $12.7 million in payments from the Ukrainian Party of Regions.
- November 6: Torshin and Matveev visit Davidson and Williamson counties in Tennessee as election observers.
- November 8: Torshin visits the NRA headquarters in Fairfax, Virginia.
- December 14: President Barack Obama signs the Magnitsky Act into law to punish Russian officials responsible for human rights violations.

=== 2013 ===
- Apparent security hackers gain access to the Trump Organization's domain registrar account at GoDaddy and register hundreds of "shadow" subdomains with IP addresses located at a company in St. Petersburg Russia known for hosting websites containing malware. Most of the subdomains are created in August. By November 1, 2017, the subdomains disappeared after the Trump Organization was notified of the issue, although the organization denied that any breach occurred.
- January: Carter Page, a petroleum industry consultant, passes documents about the oil market to Victor Podobnyy, a Russian intelligence agent. He later claims the documents were public information. Podobnyy is charged with being an unregistered foreign agent in 2015.
- March 13: The FBI interviews Manafort about his offshore business dealings.
- March 19: Manafort has dinner with Rohrabacher as part of his lobbying efforts for the government of Ukraine. Vin Weber, a partner at Mercury Affairs, is also in attendance. Three days later, Manafort gives Rohrabacher a $1,000 campaign contribution. Richard Gates, Manafort's deputy, pleads guilty in 2018 to lying about the meeting to the FBI.
- April 13: Two agents of the Russian Foreign Intelligence Service (SVR) discuss recruiting Page.
- May 3–5: Butina and Torshin attend the NRA convention in Houston, Texas.
- June: Flynn travels to Moscow at Major General Igor Sergun's invitation. Kislyak helps arrange and coordinate the trip. Flynn visits the GRU headquarters, where he meets with GRU officials, briefs GRU staff, and presents a professional development class on leadership.
- June 15–18: Attending the Miss USA 2013 pageant, Trump dines with Aras Agalarov, Emin Agalarov, and Rob Goldstone in Las Vegas. The next day he announces that Miss Universe 2013 will be held in Moscow. He sends Putin a letter inviting him to the pageant and asks on Twitter whether the Russian president will be his "new best friend".
- July 3: Carter Page schedules a dinner with potential investor Russian oligarch Viktor Vekselberg to pitch his fledgling natural gas business. It is unclear whether the meeting took place.
- August: Eric Trump tells author James Dodson, "We don't rely on American banks [...] We have all the funding we need out of Russia", and says, "We go there all the time". In May 2017, Eric Trump calls this "fabricated" and an example of why people distrust the media.
- August 25: Page sends a letter to an academic press in which he claims to be an adviser to the Kremlin.
- Early October:
  - Butina makes a presentation on "Right to Bear Arms" to the Association for the Promotion of Weapons Culture in Israel. Her presentation includes a slide claiming her organization has cooperation agreements with similar organizations in Kazakhstan, Ukraine, and Estonia, and she informs the group that it also has a cooperation agreement with the NRA. Another slide states it has a cooperation agreement with the International Defensive Pistol Association, which the Texas-based organization denies when asked in 2018.
  - Torshin or Butina invites Keene to the November "Right to Bear Arms" conference in Moscow.
- October 17:
  - In an appearance on the Late Show with David Letterman, Donald Trump says he has conducted "a lot of business with the Russians" and that he has met President Vladimir Putin.
  - Erickson begins an email conversation with Butina to make arrangements for his and Keene's trip to Moscow. Erickson informs Butina that Keen may have a "formal diplomatic meeting" after they arrive on October 30.
- October 30: After Keene and Erickson arrive in Moscow, Keene dines with Torshin and his wife.
- October 31 – November 1: Keene, Alan Gottlieb, and Paul Erickson attend the "Right to Bear Arms" conference in Moscow where they meet with Butina and Torshin. Gottlieb and Keene are invited speakers at the event. Keene is scheduled to speak on the second day. Gottlieb and his wife dine with Torshin and Butina, and receive "gifts that [display] research into their interests". In 2017, Gottlieb tells The Washington Post, "They wanted to keep communications open and form friendships."
- November 1: Keene is scheduled to meet with Peskov, though he later tells the Senate Intelligence Committee that he does not recall meeting with any government officials while in Moscow.
- Early November: Butina and Erickson discuss holding an NRA-hosted event in Moscow in 2014, an idea raised by Torshin and Keene during the "Right to Bear Arms" conference. The proposed event would honor "Right to Bear Arms," Torshin, and General Mikhail Kalashnikov. Putin would be an invitee. Erickson describes the idea as having "HIGH importance to the NRA". Later, Keene tells the Senate Intelligence Committee that the plans were dropped partly because Kalishnikov died in December 2013.
- November 3: Butina emails Erickson asking him to not publish photographs of Keene and Torshin dining together because she needs "time to think how to position this".
- November 6: Erickson begins assisting Butina with a visa application so that she can visit the NRA. This is the first occurrence of Butina using the NRA as a reason for visiting the U.S., but there is no evidence she made the trip.
- November 7: Butina again emails Erickson to dissuade him from publishing the photographs because she is concerned about attracting attention.
- November 8–10: The Trump-owned Miss Universe pageant is held in Moscow, sponsored by Sberbank. According to various reports, the event's $20 million licensing fee is paid by a Moscow real estate development firm called the Crocus Group, whose president is Aras Agalarov and vice president is his son, pop singer Emin Agalarov. One VIP guest is Alimzhan Tokhtakhounov, an alleged Russian mobster and fugitive who was recently indicted for running a high-stakes illegal gambling ring out of a Trump Tower apartment in New York City. While Putin does not attend, the event is attended by Vladimir Kozhin, the head of the Kremlin's property department, which is responsible for development projects. After the event, Trump tells Real Estate Weekly, "the Russian market is attracted to me. I have a great relationship with many Russians". During the trip, Trump meets Herman Gref, the CEO of state-controlled Sberbank, Russia's largest bank, and other oligarchs close to Putin. Agalarov and Gref co-host a dinner for Trump at the Moscow branch of Nobu, which is owned by Agalarov. Afterwards, Trump tweets to Agalarov, "I had a great weekend with you and your family. You have done a FANTASTIC job. TRUMP TOWER-MOSCOW is next."
- November 9: Early morning hours are allegedly the time the unproven "pee tape" incident might have occurred.
- November 12: The Moscow Times reports that Trump is in talks with Russian companies to build a new Trump tower in Moscow.
- November 21: The Euromaidan starts when President Yanukovych suspends preparations for the implementation of an association agreement with the European Union.
- December 10: John Bolton promotes gun rights in Russia in a video made for Butina's "Right to Bear Arms" organization that is shown to members of the Duma. Bolton made the video at the request of Keene, who was himself asked to find someone by Butina and Torshin, though Keene didn't mention Torshin by name.
- December 13: Keene emails Butina to follow up on the Bolton video and ask Butina and Torshin for advice on inviting Rogozin to the NRA's Las Vegas event in 2014. Butina responds that she and Torshin think it is a good idea.
- December 23: Trump, Trump Jr., Emin Agalarov, and Kaveladze reach an agreement for the Trump Tower Moscow project under which the Trump Organization would receive a 3.5% commission on all sales.

=== 2014 ===
- The Russians "gained computer access to multiple state and local election boards in the United States since 2014".
- Butina tells an American Facebook friend who complained about California's gun restrictions that he should "hold demonstrations" for gun rights.
- Patten provides lobbying and consulting services to the Ukrainian Opposition Bloc political party and Lyovochkin, a party leader, without registering as a foreign agent. He travels many times to Ukraine to meet with Lyovochkin and Kilimnik.
- Patten works for Cambridge Analytica to hone their microtargeting operations during the 2014 midterm elections.
- Early 2014: Erickson meets Butina in Israel, where they become romantically involved.
- January 2: Keene, who is also the opinion editor for The Washington Times, publishes in the newspaper a piece on Kalashnikov written by Torshin and partly translated by Erickson and Butina.
- January 22: An early, if not the first, public expression of support from Russia for Trump's as-yet-unannounced 2016 candidacy, came in a tweet from his hostess at the November 2013 Miss Universe pageant, Yulya Alferova (Yulya Klyushina). Her then-husband, Artem Klyushin, was later involved in the election interference. In the Senate Intelligence Committee report's "Footnote 2510", her tweets were mentioned, one shortly after the Miss Universe pageant, showing she had foreknowledge, long before the American public, of Trump's planned presidential run. She promised Russian support for his candidacy. (Note: Alferova promises support from Russia: "On January 22, 2014, Klyushina wrote on social media that, 'I'm sure @realDonaldTrump will be great president! We'll support you from Russia! America needs an ambitious leader!'; On January 28, 2015, Klyushina announced on Twitter that Trump would be running for President of the United States. Tweet, @AlferovaYulyaE, January 28, 2015. The Committee has no insight into the nature of Klyushina's knowledge of these matters or what prompted these statements.") This Russian support was later manifested in the "sweeping and systematic" Russian interference in the 2016 elections. The committee had "significant concerns regarding [Artem] Klyushin" and devoted a whole section to him and his associates: "Artem Klyushin, Konstantin Rykov, and Associates". They were involved in election interference efforts in Ukraine and the United States.
- Before January 24: The Crocus Group sends The Trump Organization a proposal to build a 194-meter tall building with 800 units at the Crocus City site in Moscow where the Miss Universe pageant was held. Trump Jr. and Emin Agalarov sign the proposal.
- February 1–4: Kushner and Ivanka Trump travel to Russia on a four-day trip at the invitation of Dasha Zhukova, a longtime friend of Ivanka and the wife of Russian oligarch Roman Abramovich. They attend a gala fundraiser for the Jewish Museum and Tolerance Center in Moscow along with Vekselberg, other oligarchs, Russian government officials, and their families. Ivanka and Emin Agalarov tour the proposed Trump Tower Moscow site at Crocus City. In 2016–17, Kushner omits the trip from his security clearance applications.
- February 10: In a Fox and Friends phone interview, Trump says Putin contacted him while he was in Moscow for the Miss Universe pageant.
- March 6:
  - Obama initiates international sanctions on certain Russian individuals, businesses and officials, in response to the Russian military intervention in Ukraine and the annexation of Crimea.
  - Speaking at the Conservative Political Action Conference (CPAC), Trump says, "You know, I was in Moscow a couple of months ago, I own the Miss Universe Pageant and they treated me so great. Putin even sent me a present, a beautiful present."
- March 21: Trump posts two tweets praising Putin regarding "Russian Empire" on the day the Russian Federal Assembly ratifies the Treaty on Accession of the "Republic of Crimea", formalizing the annexation of Crimea by the Russian Federation.
- April:
  - The Russian Internet Research Agency (IRA) creates a department called the "translator project". The department's focus is on interfering in the U.S. election.
  - The Obama administration receives a report from a well-connected Russian source that Russia is building disinformation infrastructure to disrupt the political systems in the United States and Europe.
- Early April: Erickson and Keene help Butina secure a visa for her visit to the U.S., including Keene making a "standard call" to the office of Congressman Edward Royce, Chairman of the House Foreign Affairs Committee.
- April 12: Asked about Putin by Eric Bolling on the Fox News show Cashin' In, Trump says Putin has taken the mantle from Obama. He continues, "Interestingly, I own the Miss Universe pageant, and we just left Moscow. He could not have been nicer. He was so nice and so everything. But you have to give him credit that what he's doing for that country in terms of their world prestige is very strong."
- April 24: Butina presents NRA president Jim Porter with an honorary membership in "Right to Bear Arms".
- April 25–27: Butina and Torshin attend the NRA annual conference in Indianapolis. Butina attends several meetings as a guest of Keene.
- May: The IRA begins its election interference campaign of "spread[ing] distrust towards the candidates and the political system in general".
- May 27: Speaking at a National Press Club luncheon, Trump again claims to have spoken to Putin. "I own the Miss Universe [pageant]. I was in Russia. I was in Moscow recently. And I spoke indirectly and directly with President Putin who could not have been nicer. And we had a tremendous success."
- June 2: BuzzFeed News reports on a cache of Internet Archive emails leaked by Russian hackers. The emails reveal a well-funded effort to recruit and train online trolls to post comments on top American websites.
- June 3: Kaveladze emails Trump Jr. and others about design elements and architectural details for Trump Tower Moscow.
- June 4–26: Aleksandra Krylova and Anna Bogacheva, two IRA employees, travel to the U.S. to collect intelligence. Maria Bovda, a third employee, is denied a visa. All three are indicted in February 2018 for their work on election interference.
- June 10: Trump Jr. emails Kaveladze and others about design elements and architectural details for Trump Tower Moscow.
- June 16: Trump Jr. emails Kaveladze and others again about design elements and architectural details for Trump Tower Moscow.
- Mid 2014: Dutch intelligence gains access to Russian hacking group Cozy Bear, which later, together with Fancy Bear, hacked the DNC servers. They were able to photograph each hacker, get their names, and compile dossiers on each, as they were watching the Russians perform their hacking operations in real time.
- July 2: The FBI interviews Richard Gates about his international business dealings.
- July 7: The Trump Organization sends Crocus Group a set of questions about the "demographics of these prospective buyers" in the area around the proposed Trump Tower Moscow site, the development of neighboring parcels, and concepts for redesigning portions of the building.
- July 22: Laurence Levy, a lawyer with the law firm Bracewell & Giuliani, advises Rebekah Mercer, Steve Bannon, and Alexander Nix on the legality of their company, Cambridge Analytica, being involved in U.S. elections. He advises that Nix and any foreign nationals without a green card working for the company not be involved in any decisions about work the company performs for any clients related to U.S. elections. He further advises Nix to recuse himself from any involvement with the company's U.S. election work because he is not a U.S. citizen.
- July 30: The FBI interviews Manafort about his international business dealings.
- August 4: The Trump Organization requests from Crocus Group the specifications for a Marriott-branded tower under construction near Crocus City.
- August 7: Lieutenant General Flynn retires from the U.S. Army.
- August 26: Butina invites Keene to the September "Right to Bear Arms" conference in Moscow. Keene declines citing travel conflicts and the upcoming midterm elections, but promises to attend the 2015 conference.
- Late 2014: Butina resigns from her position as the head of "Right to Bear Arms".
- September–November: The Trump Organization becomes less and less responsive to emails from the Crocus Group about the Trump Tower Moscow project, with the last response sent on November 24. Discussions end in the planning stage with no construction occurring. The death of Tamir Sapir, a potential funding source for the project, may be a contributing factor in the project's collapse.
- September 3: Paul Erickson attends a "Right to Bear Arms" forum in Moscow where he is a featured speaker.
- September 11: The IRA spreads a hoax they created about a fictitious chemical plant fire in Centerville, St. Mary Parish, Louisiana, purportedly started by ISIS. The hoax includes tweets and YouTube videos showing a chemical plant fire. Centerville is home to many chemical plants, but the plant named in the tweets does not exist. Initial tweets are sent directly to politicians, journalists, and Centerville residents.
- September 21 – October 11: The Material Evidence art exhibition is displayed at the Art Beam gallery in the Chelsea neighborhood of New York City. It portrays the conflicts in Syria and Ukraine in a pro-Russian light. It is promoted by Twitter accounts that also spread the September 11 chemical plant fire hoax. The exhibition is partly funded by the IRA.
- October 8: A Defense Department lawyer informs Flynn in writing that as a retired officer he is bound by the emoluments clause of the U.S. constitution because he can be recalled to service at any time. On April 27, 2017, Flynn comes under investigation for possibly receiving emoluments from Turkey and Russia.
- November 21: Bruce Ohr and Christopher Steele discuss cultivating Deripaska as a U.S. intelligence asset.
- November 26–30: An unnamed IRA employee travels to Atlanta.
- November 27: A tweet allegedly from a woman in New York City claims that she had food poisoning from a turkey she bought at Walmart. Within hours, there are numerous similar postings on Tumblr and Twitter making similar claims, Wikipedia articles about the incident, and a story on an alleged news site. All are created by the IRA in what is later believed to be a test to gauge how easily they can manipulate Americans.
- December 1: Butina emails Erickson asking him to help two Russian firearms companies, the Scientific Research Institute of Applied Chemistry and the Vyatsko-Polyansky Engineering Plant, attend the April 2015 NRA conference.
- December 13:
  - The IRA uses Twitter to spread a hoax about an Ebola outbreak in Atlanta. Many of the Twitter accounts used in the September 11 chemical plant fire hoax also spread this hoax. The hoax includes a YouTube video of medical workers wearing hazmat suits.
  - Using a different set of Twitter accounts, the IRA spreads a hoax about a purported police shooting of an unarmed black woman in Atlanta. The hoax includes a blurry video of the purported event.

=== January–June 2015 ===
- Russian oligarch Vladimir Potanin's investment fund AltPoint Capital Partners purchases ByteGrid LLC, which operates some of Maryland's election systems. Potanin is described as "very close" to Putin. State officials are not informed of the purchase, and remain unaware until the FBI briefs them in July 2018.
- Patten and Kilimnik start a consulting firm together in Washington, D.C., called Begemot Ventures International Ltd. The firm provides consulting services in Ukraine and lobbying services in the U.S. for Ukrainian political parties without registering as a foreign agent. Begemot shares office space with Cambridge Analytica.
- January 19–21: Patten and Kilimnik coordinate to arrange meetings for Serhiy Lyovochkin with members of the Senate Foreign Relations and the House Foreign Affairs committees, with officials from the State Department, and with numerous members of the U.S. media. In August 2018, Patten pleads guilty to failing to register as a foreign agent for this work.
- January 20: Butina emails Keene to notify him of Torshin's recent appointment as vice chairman of the Russian Central Bank, and to express concerns about the implications for Torshin's continuing relationship with the NRA.
- January 22: Butina asks Keene for assistance securing invitations for two Russian firearms companies to attend the April NRA convention. It is unknown whether the companies attended.
- January 23: A court filing by the U.S. government contains a transcript of a recorded conversation between two members of a Russian SVR spy ring, Victor Podobnyy and Igor Sporyshev. Their conversation concerns efforts to recruit "Male-1", later confirmed as Carter Page. Podobnyy calls Page an "idiot" and tells Sporyshev, "You get the documents from him and tell him to go fuck himself".
- February: Dimitri Simes meets with Putin and other Russian officials in Moscow. Simes is the publisher of The National Interest and CEO of the think tank Center for the National Interest (CNI). The Center arranges meetings between Torshin, Butina, and U.S. government officials in April, and also arranges Trump's April 27, 2016, speech at the Mayflower Hotel. In August 2024, FBI agents raided and searched Simes' house in Virginia. The United States charged Simes for working since June 2022 with Channel One Russia, a business sanctioned in 2022. He and his wife allegedly received over $1 million, plus a car and driver.
- February 5: The NRA sends invitation letters to Butina and Torshin to help them obtain U.S. visas to attend the NRA convention in April.
- February 10: Butina emails Keene and his wife with an update on Torshin's appointment. She tells them about Torshin's "recommendation" that she expand her "participation in conferences and meetings in the political circles of the Republican Party" to lay the foundation for a "trusted dialogue" between the U.S. and Russia.
- February 26–28: Butina attends CPAC at Keene's invitation.
- March 16: Keene sends Butina a list of "Key Conservative Meeting Dates" from the Conservative Action Project to help her make her U.S. travel plans.
- March 18: Trump announces he is forming a presidential exploratory committee.
- March 20: Butina asks Perrine for a list of U.S. governors and members of Congress that will be attending the NRA convention. Perrine responds with a publicly available list of politicians.
- March 24: Butina sends Erickson a Google-translated copy of her and Torshin's plan to use their existing NRA connections to develop an "informal channel of communication" with the new U.S. presidential administration, which they expect to be Republican. She requests $125,000 to attend a series of Republican-focused conferences and other outreach purposes.
- Spring:
  - U.S. Intelligence intercepts conversations of Russian government officials discussing associates of Donald Trump.
  - The IRA performs its first experiment in organizing a live event. They lure Facebook users in New York City to a purported event offering free hot dogs. There are no hot dogs, but enough people show up for the IRA to consider the experiment a success.
- April
  - Flynn begins advising ACU Strategic Partners, a company seeking to build nuclear power plants in the Middle East involving a sanctioned Russian company.
  - Butina and Torshin meet with Treasury undersecretary for international affairs Nathan Sheets to discuss U.S. Russian economic relations during the Obama administration. The meeting was arranged by the CNI.
- April 5: The CNI sends Butina an itinerary of events it arranged for Butina and Torshin to attend, including meetings with U.S. government officials.
- April 7:
  - Torshin and Butina meet with Federal Reserve vice chairman Stanley Fischer to discuss U.S. Russian economic relations during the Obama administration. The meeting was arranged by the CNI.
  - Torshin and Butina participate in discussions about the "Russian financial situation and its impact on Russian politics" at a private event moderated by Hank Greenberg and organized by the CNI. Keene, Grover Norquist, and CNI officials including Simes, Burt, and Paul Saunders.
- April 8: At Keene's invitation, Torshin, with Butina translating, gives remarks at the NRA's Charlton Heston Recognition Dinner.
- April 10: Butina, Torshin, and David Keene attend a fundraiser in Tennessee for Wisconsin Governor Scott Walker.
- April 11–12: Torshin and Butina attend the NRA convention in Nashville, Tennessee. Erickson arranged the trip, and the NRA president's assistant Nick Perrine handled the itinerary. Torshin briefly converses with Trump. Torshin and the Trump family dispute how much was said. At a reception, Keene introduces Butina and Torshin to Governor Walker, and they give Walker a gift from Russia.
- May: Kislyak and Butina discuss Governor Walker, Keene and the NRA.
- Mid-June: Kislyak hosts Keene for lunch at the Russian embassy. Afterward, Butina reaches out to Keene about the lunch, and he gives her a readout of the discussion.
- June 10: Flynn testifies before the House Foreign Affairs Committee on nuclear power in the Middle East. He omits his work for ACU Strategic Partners from both a committee disclosure form and his testimony.
- June 12: Maria Butina argues in an article she wrote for The National Interest that only a Republican president can improve relations between the U.S. and Russia.

== Presidential campaign starts: June 2015 ==
=== June–December 2015 ===
- June 16: Donald Trump announces his candidacy for president.
- June 17: In an interview on the Fox News show Hannity, Sean Hannity asks Trump if he has talked to Putin. Trump replies, "I don't want to say. But I got to meet all of the leaders. I got to meet all—I mean, everybody was there. It was a massive event. And let me tell you, it was tremendous."
- Late June: Flynn travels to Egypt and Israel. In September 2017, members of Congress present evidence to Mueller that Flynn's purpose was to promote a Russian-backed plan for the building of 40 nuclear reactors, with "total regional security" to be provided by U.S.-sanctioned Russian weapons exporter Rosoboronexport.
- July: Trump receives an invitation to Moscow for the 60th birthday of Aras Agalarov, who co-hosted the Miss Universe pageant with him in 2013.
- July onward: Thousands of fake Twitter accounts run by the IRA begin to praise Trump over his political opponents by a wide margin, according to a later analysis by The Wall Street Journal.
- July 8–12: Butina and Erickson attend Freedomfest 2015 in Las Vegas. They are registered to attend private events with Norquist, Dinesh D'Souza. and Peter Thiel.
  - July 9: Butina and Erickson attend a bitcoin panel with former Overstock.com CEO Patrick M. Byrne. They greet Byrne and discuss Overstock.com's work with women in Afghanistan. Afterward, Butina sends Byrne an email drafted by Erickson thanking him for their discussion and inviting him to meet on July 12 to discuss the types of reforms Russia should embrace. In 2020, a Senate Intelligence Committee report finds that Butina and Erickson were interested in Byrne as a possible conduit to Senator and presidential candidate Rand Paul.
  - July 11: Butina attends FreedomFest in Las Vegas, where Trump is speaking and taking questions. She asks Trump his stance on continuing sanctions; he replies he knows Putin and doesn't think sanctions are needed. Reviewing a video of the encounter, Bannon says, "Trump had a fully developed answer."
- July 13: Butina is present at Wisconsin Governor Scott Walker's presidential candidacy announcement. At Torshin's request, she writes an analytical assessment of Walker's candidacy.
- July 15: George Papadopoulos contacts Trump campaign manager Corey Lewandowski about joining the campaign as a policy advisor.
- July 17: Keene sends Torshin a letter introducing Rohrabacher and suggesting they meet during the congressman's August trip to Moscow.
- July 24: Rob Goldstone emails Trump's assistant Rhona Graff, suggesting that Emin Agalarov could arrange a meeting between Putin and Trump.
- Summer: Hackers linked to the Russian Federal Security Service (FSB) gain access to the Democratic National Committee's computer network. Dutch intelligence services had gained access to Russian hacking group Cozy Bear in mid-2014 and later alerted their U.S. counterparts that Cozy Bear, together with Fancy Bear, had penetrated the Democratic National Committee (DNC) servers.
- July 31: Flynn gives a speech to Kaspersky Government Security Solutions, a subsidiary of Kaspersky Lab, for which he is later paid $11,250.
- August:
  - Papadopoulos emails Michael Glassner, the executive director of Trump's campaign committee, expressing further interest in joining the campaign as a policy advisor. He continues corresponding with Glassner and Lewandowski for months, but is repeatedly told no position is available for him.
  - Flynn travels to New York City to meet Trump for the first time.
- August 3: Torshin and Butina discuss Rohrabacher over Twitter direct messages. He tells Butina that he believes Rohrabacher is "under the watch" of the Russian Ministry of Foreign Affairs.
- August 4–6: Rohrabacher and Behrends travel to Russia. While there, Rohrabacher meets Butina and Torshin for breakfast. In July 2018, Rohrabacher tells Politico he dined with Butina and another congressman accompanying him on the trip.
- August 6:
  - Butina tells Keene about her breakfast discussion with Rorhabacher, including that Butina could meet with Rohrabacher in the U.S. in October.
  - Keene sends Butina a list of proposed NRA attendees for the December "Right to Bear Arms" event in Moscow.
- August 8: Roger Stone leaves the Trump campaign. The campaign says it fired Stone, but Stone insists he quit. He subsequently gives the press a resignation letter that the campaign says it never received.
- August 12: Butina and Torshin discuss plans for the NRA trip to Moscow, including possibly hosting "high level meetings" if the delegation is sufficiently "respectable".
- August 15 The FBI Washington field office contacts technical staff at the DNC headquarters to alert them that their computer systems have been penetrated and data compromised by the Russians.
- August 17: Konstantin Rykov, the founder of the Russian online newspaper Vzglyad, registers two domain names: Trump2016.ru and DonaldTrump2016.ru.
- August 18: Georgi Asatryan of Vzglyad emails Hope Hicks to arrange an in-person or phone interview with Trump. According to the Mueller Report, the proposed interview never occurs.
- August 20: Kislyak meets with Keene and Allan Cors at the NRA headquarters.
- August 21: Sessions makes his first appearance at a Trump campaign rally.
- September:
  - An FBI special agent reports to the DNC that at least one of its computer systems has been hacked by an espionage team linked to the Russian government. The agent is transferred to a tech-support contractor at the help desk, who makes a cursory check of DNC server logs and does not reply to the agent's follow-up calls, allegedly because of a belief that the call might have been a prank.
  - Jill Stein speaks briefly with Russian Foreign Minister Sergey Lavrov at a Russia Today gala in New York City. She is an invited guest at the event.
  - The FBI and Ohr try to recruit Deripaska as an informant on the Kremlin and Russian organized crime in exchange for a U.S. visa. Steele helped set up the meeting.
  - A New York architect completes plans for a bold glass obelisk 100 stories high in Moscow, with the Trump logo on multiple sides.
  - Cohen attempts to arrange a meeting between Trump and Putin during the United Nations General Assembly session, with Trump asking for status updates several times. After phone calls and emails, a Russian official finally tells Cohen that such a meeting would not follow protocol.
  - The IRA begins posting videos on YouTube primarily aimed at African-Americans, eventually posting over 1,100 videos with 43 hours of content on 17 YouTube channels. The politically oriented videos are anti-Clinton, and some videos discourage African Americans from voting or encourage voting for Jill Stein.
- September–October: The Washington Free Beacon, a conservative website primarily funded by billionaire Paul Singer, hires Fusion GPS to perform opposition research on Trump. Initially a Marco Rubio supporter, Singer continues to fund the research after Rubio withdraws from the race.
- September 11: Trump speaks at the Yalta European Strategy conference in Kyiv via satellite. The organizer of the event, Victor Pinchuk, donates $150,000 to Trump's charity, the Trump Foundation.
- Late September: Felix Sater meets with Michael Cohen on behalf of I.C. Expert Investment Company to discuss building a Trump Tower in Moscow. I.C. Expert is a Russian real estate development corporation controlled by Andrei Vladimirovich Rozov. Sater agrees to find a developer and arrange for financing. Sater later contacts Rozov to propose that I.C. Expert work with the Trump Organization on the project.
- September 21: On Hugh Hewitt's radio program, Trump says, "The oligarchs are under [Putin's] control, to a large extent. I mean, he can destroy them, and he has destroyed some of them... Two years ago, I was in Moscow... I was with the top-level people, both oligarchs and generals, and top-of-the-government people. I can't go further than that, but I will tell you that I met the top people, and the relationship was extraordinary."
- September 22: Cohen forwards a Trump Tower Moscow preliminary design study to Giorgi Rtskhiladze, who then emails it to his associate Simon Nizharadze, writing, ""[i]f we could organize the meeting in New York at the highest level of the Russian Government and Mr. Trump this project would definitely receive the worldwide attention."
- September 24: Rtskhiladze emails Cohen a draft letter for the Trump Organization to send to the mayor of Moscow, explaining, ""[w]e need to send this letter to the Mayor of Moscow (second guy in Russia) he is aware of the potential project and will pledge his support." Later that day he sends Cohen a translation of the letter that describes Trump Tower Moscow as a "symbol of stronger economic, business and cultural relationships between New York and Moscow and therefore United States and the Russian Federation."
- September 27: Rtskhiladze emails Cohen a proposal for the Trump Organization to partner with Global Development Group LLC on the Trump Tower Moscow project. He describes Global Development as controlled by Nizharadze and the architect Michail Posikhin. In September 2018 Cohen tells Mueller's team that he declined the proposal and decided to continue with Sater's proposed partner, I.C. Expert Investment Company.
- October: For his July 31 remarks during a cybersecurity forum in Washington, D.C., Flynn receives $11,250 from Kaspersky Government Security Solutions Inc., the American subsidiary of Kaspersky Lab, owned by Eugene Kaspersky.
- October 5: Flynn gives an interview to Russia Today in which he criticizes the U.S. approach to ISIS and suggests the U.S. work with Russia to confront the group. After the interview, his son, Flynn Jr., receives an invitation from Russia Today for Flynn to be a guest of honor at their December gala in Moscow.
- October 6: Butina sends Torshin a list of seven potential members for the NRA Moscow delegation, including Cors and his wife, Goldschlanger and his daughter, and Keene and his wife.
- October 9: Sater emails Cohen about his plans to meet with and persuade Andrey Molchanov to provide the land for a Trump Tower in Moscow.
- October 12: Cohen has a series of email exchanges with Felix Sater about developing a Trump property in Moscow. Sater tells Cohen that VTB Bank will fund the project, and that his associates will be meeting with Putin and a deputy on October 14.
- October 13: Sater sends Cohen a letter of intent signed by Andrey Rozov for Trump to sign to move the Moscow project forward.
- October 14: Russia Today invites Stein to its anniversary gala in Moscow.
- October 19: Butina emails Erickson asking how influential Cors, Keene, Goldschlager, and Liberatore are in U.S. politics, stressing that they need politically important people to attend the December conference in Moscow.
- October 20: Flynn gives a speech to Volga-Dnepr Airlines for $11,250.
- October 25: Butina invites incoming NRA President Pete Brownell to join the NRA Moscow delegation in December so that he can meet Russian gun manufacturers and retailers.
- October 28:
  - Trump signs a letter of intent (LOI) to construct a Trump-branded building in Moscow hours before the third Republican presidential debate, a fact made public in August 2017. The LOI proposes that the tower have "[a]pproximately 250 first class, luxury residential condominiums" and "[o]ne first class, luxury hotel consisting of approximately 15 floors and containing not fewer than 150 hotel rooms." The Trump Organization would receive 1%–5% of all condominium sales and 3% of all rental and other revenues, and 20% of the operating profit.
  - Stein and Nadia Ivanova of Russia Today discuss arranging meetings for Stein with Russian government officials during Stein's upcoming trip to Moscow, including with Putin and Lavrov. According to Stein, she makes her request through Russia Today because she has contacts there and doesn't know anyone at the Russian embassy.
  - Erickson and Butina dine with Keene at the University Club of Washington, DC. According to the Senate Intelligence Committee, they may have discussed Keene's desire to interview Putin for The Washington Times while in Moscow.
- November: Trump associate Felix Sater emails Trump lawyer Michael Cohen: "Michael, I arranged for Ivanka to sit in Putin's private chair at his desk and office in the Kremlin [...] Our boy can become president of the USA and we can engineer it. I will get all of Putin's team to buy in on this". Sater also tells Cohen that the Kremlin's VTB Bank is ready to finance a Trump Tower project in Moscow.
- November 2:
  - Cohen emails the Trump Tower Moscow letter of intent to Rozov.
  - Butina asks Torshin how to arrange an interview for Keene with Putin. He responds that an interview is unlikely, but says he will pass on the request to Peskov.
- November 3:
  - In an email to Cohen, Sater predicts that building a Trump Tower in Moscow will help Trump's presidential campaign. "I will get Putin on this program and we will get Donald elected."
  - The IRA Instagram account "Stand For Freedom" attempts to organize a confederate rally in Houston, Texas, on November 14. It is unclear whether anyone showed up. The Mueller Report identifies this as the IRA's first attempt to organize a U.S. rally.
- November 9: Stein again emails Ivanova asking for help arranging meetings with Lavrov and Putin.
- November 9–19: Russia Today arranges Stein's trip to Moscow and offers to pay for it. Stein declines and refuses to be paid for participating on panels at the event. Her campaign pays for the trip.
- November 10: At the Republican debate in Milwaukee, Trump claims that he met Putin in a green room and "got to know him very well" while waiting to record their 60 minutes interviews that aired on September 27. Fact checkers quickly point out that Trump and Putin could not have met in the green room because Trump was interviewed in New York City and Putin was interviewed in Moscow.
- November 11: Flynn signs a contract with Russia Today to speak at its December gala in Moscow.
- November 12–16: Torshin and Butina discuss how to arrange a meeting with Rogozin requested by the NRA delegation since Rogozin is under U.S. sanctions. Butina says the delegation still wants the meeting despite the sanctions.
- November 13:
  - Butina tells Torshin that Simes banned CNI personnel from talking to her because he thinks she is an SVR agent.
  - Ivanova tells Stein that a meeting with Lavrov and Putin is unlikely, but Stein will be seated at Putin's table at the gala. She offers meetings with Duma Foreign Affairs Committee chair Aleksey Pushkov and Federation Council Committee on International Affairs chair Konstantin Kosachev.
  - Concerned that Cors may not be able to attend the NRA Moscow trip, Butina emails David and Donna Keene to persuade Cors to attend. She highlights "high level special events" Torshin arranged, writing that the Russian figures involved wanted to meet the "head of the most powerful political organization in America. She mentions private meetings with Russian Security Council First Secretary Nikolai Patrushev, Rogozin, Public Council of the Russian Ministry of Defense chairman Pavel Gusev, head of Putin's presidential campaigns Igor Pisarsky, and oligarch and patron of "The Right to Bear Arms" Konstantin Nikolaev.
- November 16: Lana Erchova (a.k.a. Lana E. Alexander) sends an email to Ivanka Trump in which she offers the services of her husband, Dmitry Klokov, to the Trump campaign. According to the Mueller Report, Klokov is the "Director of External Communications for PJSC Federal Grid Company of Unified Energy System, a large Russian electricity transmission company, and had been previously employed as an aide and press secretary to Russia's energy minister." Ivanka forwards the email to Cohen. In July 2018, Erchova tells Mueller's team that Russian officials wanted to offer Trump "land in Crimea among other things" and an "unofficial meeting with Putin". At least until August 2018, Cohen mistakenly thinks Klokov is the Olympic weightlifter of the same name.
- November 18:
  - IC Expert, the developer for the Trump Tower Moscow project and a signatory to Trump's letter of intent, receives a non-revolving line of credit from Sberbank for 10.6 billion rubles. IC Expert provides 100% of its equity to secure the line of credit. Sberbank agrees to finance 70% of the Trump Tower Moscow project, its largest commercial real estate loan to date.
  - Klokov writes in an email to Cohen that he is a "trusted person" offering "political synergy" and "synergy on a government level" to the Trump campaign. He suggests that Cohen travel to Moscow and meet with him and an intermediary. He says the conversations could facilitate an informal meeting between Trump and Putin, and that any such meeting must be separate from any business negotiations, though it would lead to high-level support for projects.
- November 19:
  - The IRA creates the @TEN_GOP Twitter account. Purporting to be the "Unofficial Twitter account of Tennessee Republicans," it peaks at over 100,000 followers.
  - Julian Assange privately tells a group of core WikiLeaks supporters that he prefers the GOP win the election because Clinton "is a bright, well connected, sadistic sociopath" who will have "greater freedom to start wars than the GOP and has the will to do so".
  - Kolokov writes in an email to Cohen that a properly publicized meeting between Trump and Putin could have a "phenomenal" impact "in a business dimension" and boost the "level" of projects if he receives Putin's endorsement. Cohen rejects Kolokov's offers, writing, ""[c]urrently our LOI developer is in talks with VP's Chief of Staff and arranging a formal invite for the two to meet." In September 2018, Cohen tells Mueller's team that he rejected the offers because he was already pursuing business with Sater and understood Sater had Russian government connections of his own.
  - Erickson emails Brownell about a meeting with "Russia's highest leader". Brownell responds with interest and forwards the email to his Director of Compliance. Erickson also informs Brownell that he (Brownell) will not be able to meet with Rogozin because of U.S. sanctions.
- November 24: Perrine informs Butina that Brownell will join the NRA delegation in December.
- November 25:
  - In an email to Brownell, Erickson writes, "most of the FSB agents 'assigned' to her [Butina] want to marry her", saying that is why she was able to arrange a tour of a Russian arms factory for the NRA delegation.
  - Perrine sends Keene an itinerary for the NRA's Russia trip that includes meetings with Lavrov and Rogozin.
  - Unable to attend the NRA Moscow trip, Cors writes a letter to Torshin designating Keene and Joe Gregory as official representatives in Moscow for the NRA.
- December: Unable to find a position in the Trump campaign, Papadopoulos joins the Ben Carson campaign.
- December 1:
  - Sater emails Cohen, asking, "Please scan and send me a copy of your passport for the Russian Ministry of Foreign Affairs."
  - Russia Today announces that Flynn will be speaking at its gala.
- December 2:
  - Trump tells the Associated Press that he is "not that familiar with" Felix Sater and refers questions to his staff.
  - Flynn and his son, Michael G. Flynn (called "Jr."), visit Kislyak at his home.
- December 3: Barbara Ledeen, a longtime staffer for Senator Chuck Grassley on the Senate Judiciary Committee and wife of close Flynn associate and Iran–Contra affair figure Michael Ledeen, sends Peter W. Smith a 25-page proposal for finding Clinton's missing emails. The proposal posits that Clinton's private email server was hacked, something that never happened, and proposes, among other things, contacting foreign intelligence services to determine if they have any copies of Clinton's emails. At the time, her investigation is not connected to the Trump campaign, though she gives Flynn regular updates throughout the summer of 2016. Smith forwards the email to Jonathan Safron and John Szobocsan.
- December 8: Flynn and his son travel to Moscow to attend the Russia Today gala.
- December 8–13: Outspoken Trump supporter Milwaukee Sheriff David Clarke and his wife, former NRA President David Keene, future NRA President Pete Brownell, NRA Golden Ring of Freedom Chair Joe Gregory, major NRA donors Hilary and Arnold Goldschlager, Outdoor Channel CEO Jim Liberatore and his wife, and NRA member Paul Erickson travel to Moscow for the "Right to Bear Arms" convention. They meet Russian government officials, including Deputy Prime Minister of Russia Dmitry Rogozin and Foreign Minister Sergey Lavrov. Rogozin is under U.S. sanctions. Butina accompanies the delegation on a tour of the gun manufacturer ORSIS, where they meet with the company's executives, including Svetlana Nikolaev, president of ORSIS's parent company and wife of billionaire Konstantin Nikolaev. They also meet with Torshin and Sergei Rudov, head of Saint Basil the Great Charitable Foundation. They attend a party at a Moscow hunting club hosted by Torshin and Gusev. Clarke later files an ethics report showing that Butina's organization, "Right to Bear Arms", covered $6,000 of his expenses. Butina covers some of the cost of Liberatore's attendance, and is subsequently reimbursed $6,000 by the NRA from its president's budget. After the Lavrov meeting, Butina emails Torshin, writing, "We should let them express their gratitude now, and put pressure on them quietly later." In May 2018, NRA spokeswoman Dana Loesch denies there was an NRA trip to Moscow, then clarifies in July 2018 that it wasn't an official trip. A 2019 report by the Democratic Minority of the Senate Finance Committee concludes that despite the public denials, internal NRA documents show the trip was an officially sanctioned event that may have imperiled the NRA's tax-free status.
- December 9: Stein flies to Moscow with her communications director.
- December 10:
  - Stein and Flynn spend the day attending the Russia Today gala. Stein participates on a panel called "Frenemies: defining foes and allies in proxy politics" with Cyril Svoboda, Willy Wimmer, and Ken Livingstone.
  - Stein attends a cocktail reception before the gala dinner where she socializes with former governor Jesse Ventura and his wife, and networks with "the peace community".
  - Flynn gives a paid speech on world affairs in Moscow, at a gala dinner organized by RT. Flynn had appeared on RT as an analyst after retiring from the U.S. Army. Putin is the dinner's guest of honor. Flynn is seated next to Putin; among the 10 people seated at the head table are Stein, Wimmer, RT Editor-in-Chief Margarita Simonyan, and members of Putin's inner circle, including Sergei Ivanov, Dmitry Peskov, Vekselberg, and Alexey Gromov. Other dinner attendees include Brooklyn Nets owner Mikhail Prokhorov, former U.S.S.R. president Mikhail Gorbachev, other RT officials, and U.S. embassy spokesman William Stevens in his official capacity. For his speech, Flynn nets $33,500 of the $45,000 paid to his speakers bureau. For all of 2015, Flynn receives more than $65,000 from companies linked to Russia. On April 25, 2017, Flynn's lawyer claims that Flynn briefed the Defense Intelligence Agency on the trip both before and after.
  - ABC News reports that Trump denied knowing Sater under oath in a 2013 video deposition even though Sater was involved in several of his high-profile projects. Trump testified, "If he were sitting in the room right now, I really wouldn't know what he looked like."
- December 11:
  - Stein has lunch with Pushkov and is told Kosachev cannot attend.
  - RT leads a tour of the Kremlin with Stein and other guests of the gala.
  - Flynn and his son leave Moscow.
- December 13: Stein returns home from Moscow.
- December 16: Smith declines to help Ledeen's endeavor to find Clinton's emails because he feels the search isn't viable at the time.
- December 19: In an email to Cohen, Sater talks about securing financing from VTB, a Russian bank under American sanctions. Sater also asks for Cohen's and Trump's passport information so that VTB can facilitate obtaining visas. VTB would be issuing the invitation, he writes, because "[p]olitically neither Putins office nor Ministry of Foreign Affairs cannot issue invite, so they are inviting commercially/ business." He writes that they will be invited to the Russian consulate that week to receive an invitation and visas for traveling to Russia. Cohen sends images of his own passport but not Trump's.
- December 21:
  - Clinton campaign chairman John Podesta receives an email, which is later leaked by WikiLeaks, advising the campaign on how to handle Trump, recommending that the "best approach is to slaughter Donald for his bromance with Putin".
  - Sater texts Cohen asking again for a copy of Trump's passport. Cohen replies, "After I return from Moscow with you with a date for him." In September 2018 Cohen tells Mueller's team that Rhona Graff provided Trump's passport to Cohen's office, but the Mueller Report says the team could not find any evidence of a copy being sent to Sater.
  - On Russian Deputy Prime Minister Sergei Prikhodko's behalf, Mira Duma emails Ivanka Trump an invitation for Donald Trump to attend the St. Petersburg International Economic Forum. Duma is acquainted with Ivanka from the fashion industry.
- December 30: Cohen emails Sater complaining about the lack of progress on the Trump Tower Moscow project. Sater responds that he helped bury the ABC News story in which Trump denied knowing him. Cohen tells Sater in a text message that he will set up a meeting with Russian government officials himself.
- December 31: Sater tells Cohen that Genbank (Генбанк), recently put under U.S. sanctions, will be the new funder for the Trump Tower Moscow project.
- Late 2015 – early 2016: Trump Jr. and Ivanka Trump are included on emails about the Trump Tower Moscow project. Ivanka Trump recommends an architect.

=== January–March 2016 ===
- January:
  - Flynn applies to renew his security clearance for five years. In an interview with security investigators he claims U.S. companies paid for his trip to the RT dinner in Moscow. Documents subsequently obtained by the House Oversight Committee show that RT paid for the trip.
  - FBI initiates tax evasion and money laundering investigation regarding payments from the Ukrainian government to Paul Manafort.
- January 3: GRU chief Sergun dies from a reported heart attack. Flynn reaches out to Kislyak to express his condolences.
- January 7: Ivanka Trump forwards to Rhona Graff the December 21 invitation for her father she received from Duma on Prikhodko's behalf.
- January 11: Cohen tries to send an email to Dmitry Peskov asking to be connected to Putin's chief of staff, Sergei Ivanov, but it bounces because of a typo in the email address.
- January 14:
  - Cohen emails Peskov atinfo@prpress.gov.ru seeking help to jump-start the Trump Tower Moscow project because "the communication between our two sides has stalled", but does not receive a response. In August 2017 Peskov tells CNN that Cohen's email "went unanswered [because it] was solely regarding a real estate deal and nothing more."
  - Graff responds to Duma's December 21 email that Trump is "honored to be asked to participate in the highly prestigious" St. Petersburg Forum, but must decline the invitation because of his "very grueling and full travel schedule." Graff asks Duma if she should "send a formal note to the Deputy Prime Minister," and Duma replies that that would be "great."
- January 16: Cohen emails at Peskov at Pr_peskov@prpress.gov.ru, the correct address he mistyped on January 11, and repeats his request to speak with Ivanov. Later Cohen tells Congress and Mueller's team that he received no response to this email and abandoned the Trump Moscow Project. He later admits to federal prosecutors that he did receive a response and continued working on the project and keeping Trump updated on progress into June 2016.
- January 19: Konstantin Sidorkov, executive at VKontakte (commonly called VK, Russia's equivalent of Facebook), emails Trump Jr. and social media director Dan Scavino offering to help promote Trump's campaign to its nearly 100 million users. Goldstone brokered the overture. Sidorkov emails again on November 5, 2016.
- January 20:
  - A Russian social media company emails Trump Jr., Trump's personal assistant, and Scavino about setting up a page for Trump's campaign.
  - Peskov's personal assistant Elena Polikova sends an email to Cohen from her personal account asking him to call her on her personal phone number, which she provides. Cohen calls her and explains the nature and status of the project, and asks for assistance with securing land and financing. The conversation includes a discussion of giving Putin a $50 million penthouse in the tower as a gift. Later Cohen tells prosecutors that Polikova took notes, asked detailed questions, and said she needed to follow up with people in Russia.
- January 21: Sater texts Cohen asking for a call. He writes, "It's about Putin they called today." Sater emails Cohen a draft invitation from Genbank for Cohen to visit Russia, which Sater says is being offered at the behest of VTB, and asks Cohen if any changes need to be made. Sater and Cohen work on edits for the next few days.
- January 22: In a January 22 meeting, the Russian government decided to use "all possible force" to ensure a "mentally unstable" Donald Trump will win the presidential election. They believe that Trump will help secure Russia's strategic objectives, among them "social turmoil" in the U.S. and a weakening of the American president's negotiating position. This information from The Guardian is first reported on July 15, 2021, and is based on a tranche of leaked papers from the Kremlin.
- January 25: Sater sends Cohen a signed invitation from Andrey Ryabinskiy of the company MHJ to travel to "Moscow for a working visit" about the "prospects of development and the construction business in Russia," "the various land plots available suited for construction of this enormous Tower," and "the opportunity to co-ordinate a follow-up visit to Moscow by Mr. Donald Trump." In September 2018 Cohen tells Mueller's team that he didn't use the invitation to travel to Moscow because he didn't receive any concrete proposals for suitable land plots.
- January 26: Sater asks Cohen to take a call from Evgeny Shmykov, who is coordinating their project in Moscow. Cohen agrees.
- January 30: Carter Page emails senior Trump Campaign officials, including Glassner, informing them that his discussions with "high level contacts" with "close ties to the Kremlin" led him to believe "a direct meeting in Moscow between Mr[.] Trump and Putin could be arranged."
- February–April: Papadopoulos works for the same company as Mifsud, the London Centre of International Law Practice.
- February 2: Trump comes in second in the Iowa caucuses. In 2017 Cohen asserts that all efforts on the Trump Tower Moscow project ended before this date.
- February 4: Papadopoulos contacts Lewandowski via LinkedIn and emails Michael Glassner about joining the Trump campaign.
- February 4–5: Kremlin information security adviser Andrey Krutskikh tells the Infoforum 2016 conference in Moscow that Russia's new "information arena" strategies are equivalent to the 1940s nuclear bomb tests that put the Soviet Union on equal footing when talking to the United States.
- February 4–6: Papadopoulos reaches out to the London Centre of International Law Practice (LCILP) looking for a job because his role at the Carson campaign is over. He takes a position at the ICILP's London office.
- February 10: IRA instructs workers to "use any opportunity to criticize Hillary and the rest (except Sanders and Trump—we support them)."
- February 28: Sessions formally endorses Trump.
- February 29:
  - Manafort submits a five-page proposal to Trump outlining his qualifications to help Trump secure enough convention delegates and win the Republican presidential nomination. Manafort describes how he assisted several business and political leaders, notably in Russia and Ukraine.
  - Trump receives a letter from Aras Agalarov expressing "great interest" in Trump's "bright electoral campaign."
- Early March: Clovis recommends Carter Page and he begins working for the Trump campaign as an unpaid foreign policy adviser.
- March 2:
  - Assange consoles a core WikiLeaks supporter who is upset about Clinton's success in the primary elections the day before, writing, "Perhaps Hillary will have a stroke."
  - Papadopoulos again emails Glassner about joining the Trump campaign. Joy Lutes responds to Papaoapoulos that Glassner instructed her to introduce him to national co-chair and chief policy advisor Sam Clovis.
- March 3:
  - Sessions is appointed to the Trump campaign's national security advisory committee.
  - Clovis researches Papadopoulos on Google. Clovis is impressed with his past work at the Hudson Institute and arranges a phone call for March 6.
- March 6: Clovis asks Papadopoulos to join the Trump campaign as a foreign policy advisor after discussing the position in a phone call. The campaign hires Papadopoulos on Ben Carson's recommendation. Papadopoulos is told that a priority of the campaign is a better relationship with Russia.
- March 12: Russian-American Simon Kukes donates $2,700 to the Trump campaign. It is his first-ever political donation and later becomes a subject of the Mueller investigation.

- March 14:
  - Papadopoulos first meets Mifsud while in Rome on a trip to visit officials affiliated with Link Campus University as part of his LCILP job. After Papadopoulos mentions his position with the Trump campaign, Mifsud shows more interest and offers to introduce him to European leaders and others with contacts to the Russian government.
  - Kushner attends a CNI lunch for Henry Kissinger at the invitation of CNI board member Richard Plepler. Kushner uses it as an opportunity to seek Simes's assistance in securing foreign policy professionals' support for the Trump campaign.
- March 15:
  - Trump closes in on the Republican nomination, having won five primaries.
  - In Moscow, Russian military intelligence hacker Ivan Yermakov, working for Fancy Bear, begins probing the DNC computer network.
  - In St. Petersburg, shift workers posing as Americans follow instructions to attack Clinton on Facebook and Twitter.
- March 16:
  - The FBI releases its Report of Investigation on Flynn's security clearance renewal application.
  - WikiLeaks publishes a searchable archive of 30,000 Clinton emails that had been released by the State Department in response to a FOIA request. Internal WikiLeaks messages indicate the purpose of the archive is to annoy Clinton and establish WikiLeaks as a "resource/player" in the election.
- March 17:
  - According to Trump's written answers to Mueller's team, Prikhodko sends another invitation for Trump to attend the St. Petersburg International Economic Forum to Rhona Graff.
  - Papadopoulos returns to London from his Rome trip.
- March 19: Podesta is asked to change his email password in an apparent phishing attempt, believed to be spearheaded by Russian hackers. They gain access to his account, and proceed to steal the entire contents of his account, about 50,000 emails.
- March 21:
  - In a Washington Post interview, Trump names members of his foreign policy team, including Papadopoulos and Page. Page had helped open the Moscow office of investment banking firm Merrill Lynch and advised Russian state-owned energy giant Gazprom, in which Page is an investor. He had blamed 2014 US sanctions relating to Russia's annexation of Crimea for driving down Gazprom's stock price.
  - Russian hackers steal over 50,000 emails from Podesta's account.
- March 24:
  - Reuters article: "From Russia with love: why the Kremlin backs Trump". The article details how Russia praises Trump and how Trump defends Russia: "Trump is the first member of the American elite in 20 years who compliments Russia. Trump will smash America as we know it, we've got nothing to lose," Konstantin Rykov told his followers on social media." Konstantin Rykov is one of those deeply involved in the Russian interference in America's elections.
  - In London, Papadopoulos meets Mifsud and Olga Polonskaya, who falsely claims to be Putin's niece. Polonskaya tells Papadopoulos that she is a friend of the Russian ambassador in London and offers to help establish contacts with Russia. Papadopoulos leaves the meeting with the expectation that he will be introduced to the Russian ambassador, but it never occurs. Polonskaya is in regular email contact with Papadopoulos, in one message writing, "We are all very excited by the possibility of a good relationship with Mr. Trump".
  - Papadopoulos emails Trump campaign officials about his new Russian contacts. He emails Trump's foreign policy team that he met with Putin's niece and the Russian ambassador in London, and claims the ambassador also acts as the Deputy Foreign Minister of Russia. He writes that the Russian leadership wants to meet with campaign officials in a "neutral" city or Moscow "to discuss U.S.-Russia ties under President Trump", and that Putin and the Russian leadership are ready to meet with Trump. Clovis replies that he thinks any meetings with Russians should be delayed until after the campaign has a chance to talk with NATO allies and "we have everyone on the same page." In 2018, Papadopoulos tells the House Judiciary Committee that he lied about meeting the Russian ambassador.
  - Papadopoulos searches Google for information on Polonskaya and discovers that she is not Putin's niece.
- March 25: Lawyer Alexandra Chalupa, who worked in the White House Office of Public Liaison during the Clinton administration and has strong ties to the Ukrainian-American community, shares with the Ukrainian ambassador to the U.S. her concerns that Manafort may get involved with the Trump campaign. Chalupa had become familiar with Manafort's activities in Ukraine while researching the turmoil in the country over the previous two years for a pro bono client.
- March 26: Papadopolous searches the Internet for Andrei Klimov and Ivan Timofeev. Mifsud introduces Papadopolous to Timofeev on April 18.
- March 28:
  - Manafort is brought on to the campaign to lead the delegate-wrangling effort. According to Gates, Manafort travels to Mar-a-Lago in Florida to ask for the job, without pay, and is hired on the spot. In 2018, Gates tells Mueller's team that Manafort's intention was to monetize his relationship with the new administration should Trump win.
  - Clovis emails Lewandowski and other campaign officials praising Page's work for the campaign.
- March 29:
  - On Stone's recommendation, Manafort joins the Trump campaign as convention manager, tasked with lining up delegates.
  - Polonskaya attempts to send Papadopoulos a text message that was drafted by Mifsud. The message addresses Papadopoulos's "wish to engage with the Russian Federation."
  - The Trump campaign announces that Manafort will be the campaign's Convention Manager.

- March 30:
  - Chalupa briefs the DNC's communications staff on Manafort's and Trump's ties to Russia.
  - Gates sends four memoranda written by Manafort to Kilimnik for translation and distribution. The memoranda, addressed separately to Deripaska and Ukrainian oligarchs Lyovochkin, Akhmetov, and Boris Kolesnikov, describe Manafort's new role with the Trump campaign and express his willingness to continue consulting on Ukrainian politics. Manafort follows up with Kilimnik on April 11 to ensure the messages were sent and seen by the recipients.

- March 31:
  - At the first meeting of Trump's foreign policy team, which includes Trump and Sessions, Papadopoulos speaks of his connections with Russia, and offers to negotiate a meeting between Trump and Putin. The meeting is held at the yet-to-open Trump International Hotel Washington, D.C. Sessions later states he opposed the idea, and two people who were present support his assertions, but differ in what he objected to and how strongly. In late summer 2017 Papadopoulos and Gordon tell Mueller's team that Trump was "supportive and receptive to the idea of a meeting with Putin," and that Sessions supported Papadopoulos's efforts to arrange a meeting. Papadopoulos's lawyers assert in a September 2018 court filing that Trump nodded in agreement to the offer, and that Sessions said the campaign should look into it.
  - Graff prepares a letter for Trump's signature that declines Prikhodko's March 17 invitation to St. Petersburg because of Trump's busy schedule, but says he otherwise "would have gladly given every consideration to attending such an important event."
  - New York investment banker Robert Foresman emails Graff seeking an in-person meeting with Trump. The email is sent after Trump business associate Mark Burnett brokers an introductory phone call. Foresman writes that he has long-standing personal and professional expertise in Russia and Ukraine, and mentions that he was involved with setting up an early private back channel between Putin and former president George W. Bush. He also writes about an "approach" he received from "senior Kremlin officials" about Trump. He asks Graff for a meeting with Trump, Lewandowski, or "another relevant person" to discuss the approach and other "concrete things" that he doesn't want to discuss over "unsecure email."
- Spring:
  - U.S. intelligence officials' suspicions of Russian meddling in the presidential election grow after their counterparts in Europe warn that Russian money might be flowing into the election.
  - Stone tells associates he is in contact with Assange.

=== April 2016 ===
- April:
  - Between April and November 2016, there are at least 18 further exchanges by telephone and email between Russian officials and the Trump team.
  - Hackers linked to the GRU gain access to the DNC computer network.
  - Russian social media company SocialPuncher releases an analysis showing that Trump has quoted or retweeted Twitter bots 150 times since the beginning of 2016.
  - The IRA starts buying online ads on social media and other sites. The ads support Trump and attack Clinton.
  - Marc Elias, a lawyer at Perkins Coie and general counsel for the Clinton campaign, takes over funding of the Fusion GPS Trump investigation. He uses discretionary funds at his disposal and does not inform the campaign about the research.
  - The intelligence agency of a Baltic state shares a piece of intelligence with the director of the CIA regarding the Trump campaign. The intelligence is allegedly a recording of a conversation about Russian government money going to the Trump campaign.
  - Stone first told one of Trump's top aides WikiLeaks had plans to leak information during the presidential race, kickstarting the campaign to take advantage of the expected releases.
- April 1: Carter Page is invited to deliver a commencement address at the New Economic School in Moscow in July.

- April 1–3:
  - Rohrabacher meets with Natalia Veselnitskaya in Moscow to discuss the Magnitsky Act. Vladimir Yakunin, under U.S. sanctions, is also present. Rohrabacher later says he met Yakunin at the request of Kislyak. He also meets with officials at the Russian Prosecutor General's office, where he receives a document full of accusations against Magnitsky. U.S. Embassy officials are worried Rohrabacher may be meeting with FSB agents. The meeting at the prosecutor's office is not on his itinerary. The document is given to Rohrabacher by Deputy Prosecutor Viktor Grin, who is under U.S. sanctions authorized by the Magnitsky Act. Rohrabacher subsequently uses the document in efforts to undermine the Magnitsky Act. His accepting the document from Grin, a sanctioned individual, and using it to influence U.S. government policy leads to a July 21, 2017, complaint being filed against Rohrabacher and his staff director, Paul Behrends, for violating Magnitsky Act sanctions.
  - While in Moscow with Rohrabacher, Rohrabacher's aide Paul Behrends introduces Congressman French Hill to Veselnitskaya and Rinat Akhmetshin. Veselnitskaya gives Hill a document nearly identical to the one Grin gave to Rohrabacher.
- April 3: The IRA Twitter account @TEN_GOP announces that the Tennessee Republican Party endorses Trump.
- April 4:
  - A rally is held in Buffalo, New York, protesting the death of India Cummings. Cummings was a black woman who had recently died in police custody. The IRA's "Blacktivist" account on Facebook actively promotes the event, reaching out directly to local activists on Facebook Messenger asking them to circulate petitions and print posters for the event. Blacktivist supplies the petitions and poster artwork.
  - Graff emails her March 31 letter for Prikhodko to Jessica Macchia, another executive assistant to Trump, to print on letterhead for Trump to sign.
  - Graff forwards Foresman's March 31 email to Macchia.
- April 6:
  - Hackers spearphish the credentials of a Democratic Congressional Campaign Committee (DCCC) employee.
  - Around this date, Chalupa discusses with a foreign policy legislative assistant to Representative Marcy Kaptur the possibility of a congressional investigation into Manafort. Kaptur is the co-chair of the Congressional Ukrainian Caucus. In 2017, Chalupa tells Politico, "It didn't go anywhere."
- April 10: Carter Page and Papadopoulos arrange a Skype call in which they discuss outreach to Russia and the Caucasus.
- April 10–11: Papadopoulos learns of Polonskaya's attempt to send him a text message on March 29 and sends her an email to arrange another meeting. She responds that she is "back in St. Petersburg" but "would be very pleased to support [Papadopoulos's] initiatives between our two countries" and "to meet [him] again." Papadopoulos replies that she should introduce him to "the Russian Ambassador in London" to talk to him or "anyone else you recommend, about a potential foreign policy trip to Russia." Mifsud is copied on the email exchange. Mifsud writes, "This is already been agreed. I am flying to Moscow on the 18th for a Valdai meeting, plus other meetings at the Duma. We will talk tomorrow." Polonskaya responds that she has "already alerted my personal links to our conversation and your request," that "we are all very excited the possibility of a good relationship with Mr. Trump," and that "[t]he Russian Federation would love to welcome him once his candidature would be officially announced."
- April 11: Manafort and Konstantin Kilimnik exchange emails about whether recent press coverage of Manafort joining the Trump campaign can be used to make them "whole" with Deripaska. Manafort is in debt to Deripaska for millions of dollars at the time. Kilimnik confirms to Manafort that Deripaska is aware Manafort is on Trump's campaign team.
- April 12:
  - Russian hackers use stolen credentials to infiltrate the DCCC's computer network and install malware.
  - Papadopoulos and Mifsud meet at the Andaz Hotel in London.
- April 16: A rally protesting the death of Freddie Gray attracts large crowds in Baltimore. The IRA's Blacktivist Facebook group promotes and organizes the event, including reaching out to local activists.
- April 17: Veselnitskaya's lawyer Mark Cymrot emails her that Ahkmetshin boasted that he recruited Sessions to launch an investigation into U.S. sanctions against Russia.
- April 18:
  - While in Moscow, Mifsud introduces Papadopoulos to Ivan Timofeev via email. Timofeev is the program director of the Kremlin-sponsored Valdai Discussion Club and a member of the Russian International Affairs Council (RIAC). Papadopoulos and Timofeev communicate for months over email and Skype about potential meetings between Russian government officials and members of the Trump campaign. Later records indicate that Timofeev discussed Papadopoulos with former Russian Foreign Minister Igor S. Ivanov. In August 2017, Papadopoulos tells Mueller's team that he believed at the time his conversations with Timofeev were monitored.
  - Russian hackers break into the DNC's computers.
- April 19:
  - Russian hackers create a fictitious online persona, "Carrie Feehan", to register the domain DCLeaks.com, paid for in bitcoin, to release stolen documents.
  - The IRA purchases its first pro-Trump ad through its "Tea Party News" Instagram account. The Instagram ad asks users to upload photos with the hashtag #KIDS4TRU to "make a patriotic team of young Trump supporters."
  - Papadopoulos meets with Oleg Lebedev, a Russian Trump supporter, at the Byzantium Café in London. Papadopoulos thinks Lebedev is in the oil business in Moscow and has contacts in the Russian government. They met through Lebedev's wife, Maria Alxopoulou.
- April 19–21: Israeli embassy in London political counselor Christian Cantor introduces Papadopoulos to Australian High Commission to London political counselor Erika Thompson by email. Papadopolous and Thompson arrange to meet on April 26.
- April 20:
  - Sater texts Cohen asking when he is going to travel to Moscow.
  - Chalupa receives from the administrators of her email account the first in a series of messages warning that "state-sponsored actors" were trying to hack in to her emails.
- April 21: A staffer at the CNI photographs a detailed outline of the foreign policy speech Trump was scheduled to deliver on April 27, which was sitting on the desk of Simes, the center's president. The House Intelligence Committee would later investigate Simes' involvement in drafting the speech.
- April 22: After talking on Skype, Ivan Timofeev thanks Papadopoulos via email "for an extensive talk" and proposes meeting in London or Moscow.
- April 23: A small group of white-power demonstrators hold a rally they call "Rock Stone Mountain" at Stone Mountain Park near Stone Mountain, Georgia. They are confronted by a large group of protesters, and some violent clashes ensue. The counterprotest was heavily promoted by IRA accounts on Tumblr, Twitter, and Facebook, and the IRA website blackmatters.com. The IRA uses its Blacktivist account on Facebook to contact activist and academic Barbara Williams Emerson, the daughter of Hosea Williams, to help promote the protests. Afterward, RT blames anti-racist protesters for violence and promotes two videos shot at the event.
- April 25:
  - Timofeev emails Papadopoulos that he spoke "to Igor Ivanov[,] the President of RIAC and former Foreign Minister of Russia," and relays Ivanov's advice that a "Moscow visit" should be arranged through the Russian Embassy in Washington because it is a political matter.
  - Before the second Mifsud meeting, Papadopoulos emails Stephen Miller, informing him that "[t]he Russian government has an open invitation by Putin for Mr. Trump to meet him when he is ready" and that "[t]he advantage of being in London is that these governments tend to speak a bit more openly in 'neutral' cities."
  - Foresman emails Graff to remind her of his March 31 email seeking a meeting with Trump, Lewandowski, or another appropriate person.
- April 26:
  - Michael Isikoff of Yahoo News is the first to report on Manafort's legal dispute with Deripaska in the Cayman Islands.
  - Papadopoulos meets Mifsud in London again at the Andaz Hotel. Mifsud claims that he has learned that Russians are in possession of thousands of stolen emails that may be politically damaging to Clinton. These emails were stolen in hackings of the DNC. This is the first of at least two times the Trump campaign is told Russia has "dirt" on Hillary Clinton. The next time was on June 3. The public first learns of the hackings of both presidential campaigns on May 18.
  - Papadopoulos meets with Erika Thompson.
- April 27:
  - Trump, Sessions and Jared Kushner greet Russian Ambassador Sergey Kislyak at the Mayflower Hotel in Washington D.C. This contact is repeatedly omitted from testimony or denied. Kushner and Sessions knew in advance that the CNI invited Kislyak to the event. Mueller's team did not find any evidence that Trump or Sessions conversed with Kislyak after Trump's speech. Afterward, Kislyak reports the conversation with Sessions to Moscow. Kushner is the first to publicly admit the Kislyak meeting took place in his prepared statement for Senate investigators on July 24, 2017. Also in attendance are the ambassadors from Italy and Singapore, who are major players in the upcoming sale of stakes in Rosneft.
  - Trump speaks at the Mayflower Hotel at the invitation of The National Interest, the magazine of the CNI. He delivers a speech that calls for improved relations between the U.S. and Russia. The speech was edited by Papadopoulos, though his edits were largely rejected by Stephen Miller, and crafted with the assistance of Simes and Richard Burt. Burt is a board member of the CNI and a lobbyist for Gazprom. Papadopoulos brings the speech to the attention of Mifsud and Polonskaya, and tells Timofeev that it should be considered "the signal to meet". Simes later moves to Moscow.
  - Papadopolous and Timofeev speak over Skype. Papadopoulos finds Timofeev's formal tone to be "strange" and hears static noises suggesting the call is being recorded.
  - Papadopoulos emails Stephen Miller that he has "some interesting messages coming in from Moscow about a trip when the time is right."
  - Papadopoulos tells Lewandowski via email that he has "been receiving a lot of calls over the last month about Putin wanting to host [Trump] and the team when the time is right."
  - Graff sends Foresman an apology and forwards his March 31 and April 26 emails to Lewandowski.
  - Chalupa discusses her Manafort research with Ukrainian investigative journalists at an event organized by the Open World Leadership Center at the Library of Congress.
- Late April: The DNC's IT department notices suspicious computer activity. Within 24 hours, the DNC contacts the FBI, and hires a private cybersecurity firm, CrowdStrike, to investigate.
- April 29: DNC staffer Rachel Palermo notifies her colleagues by email that their Factivists blog has been "compromised" and includes the new password.
- April 30: Foresman sends Graff another email reminding her of his meeting requests on March 31 and April 26. He suggests an alternative meeting with Trump Jr. or Eric Trump so that he can tell them information that "should be conveyed to [the candidate] personally or [to] someone [the candidate] absolutely trusts".

=== May 2016 ===
- May:
  - CrowdStrike determines that sophisticated adversaries—denominated Cozy Bear and Fancy Bear—are responsible for the DNC hack. Fancy Bear, in particular, is suspected of affiliation with Russia's Main Intelligence Directorate (GRU).
  - Erickson contacts Trump campaign advisor Rick Dearborn. In an email headed "Kremlin Connection", Erickson seeks the advice of Dearborn and Sessions about how to arrange a meeting between Trump and Putin. Erickson suggests making contact at the NRA's annual convention in Kentucky. The communication refers to Torshin, who is under instructions to contact the Trump campaign.
  - At Butina's urging, Christian activist Rick Clay emails Dearborn with the subject "Russian backdoor overture and dinner invite" offering a meeting between Trump and Torshin. Dearborn, then Sessions's Chief of Staff, sends an email mentioning a person from West Virginia seeking to connect Trump campaign members with Putin. Dearborn appears "skeptical" of the meeting request. Jared Kushner rejects the request. Torshin and Trump Jr. later meet and speak at the NRA convention.
  - Papadopoulos travels to Greece and meets with Greece's president Prokopios Pavlopoulos, defense minister Panos Kammenos, foreign minister Nikos Kotzias, and a former prime minister. Putin makes an official visit to Athens during Papadopoulos's trip.
  - Michael Caputo arranges a meeting in Miami with Stone, Florida-based Russian Henry Oknyansky (a.k.a. "Henry Greenberg"), and Ukrainian Alexei Rasin. Rasin claims to have evidence showing Clinton was involved in laundering hundreds of thousands of dollars through Rasin's companies. Stone turns down the offer, telling them that Trump won't pay for opposition research. In June 2018, after many repeated denials, Stone finally admits to knowingly meeting with a Russian national in 2016 when asked about this meeting by The Washington Post. In May 2018, Caputo tells Mueller's team that he did not attend the meeting, did not know what Oknyansky was offering, and did not know payment was asked for until Stone told him later. In July 2018, Oknyansky tells Mueller's team that Rasin was motivated by money, and that Caputo attended the meeting. According to the Mueller Report, Mueller's team is unable to find any evidence that Clinton ever did any business with Rasin.
  - A new American shell company, "Silver Valley Consulting", is set up by Russian-born accountant Ilya Bykov for Aras Agalarov.
  - Patten and Kilimnik write a letter for Lyovochkin to use in lobbying a "high-ranking member" of the State Department. In August 2018, Patten pleads guilty to failing to register as a foreign agent for this work.
  - The IRA releases a Google Chrome plugin called FaceMusic that ostensibly allows users to listen to free music while browsing Facebook, but also participates in a botnet.
- May 2:
  - A second rally is held in Buffalo, New York, protesting the death of India Cummings. Like the April 4 rally, the event is heavily promoted by the IRA's Blacktivist Facebook account, including attempted outreach to local activists.
  - Graff forwards Foresman's April 30 email to Stephen Miller.
- May 4:
  - Timofeev emails Papadopoulos that his colleagues from the ministry "are open for cooperation." Papadopoulos forwards the email to Lewandowski and asks whether this is "something we want to move forward with."
  - Manafort meets with Kilimnik.
  - From May 4 through September, a pair of servers owned by Alfa-Bank look up the Trump Organization's mail1.trump-email.com domain on a server housed by Listrak and administered by Cendyn more than 2,000 times. Alfa-Bank performs the most lookups during this period, followed by Spectrum Health, and then Heartland Payment Systems, with 76 lookups; beyond that no other visible entity makes more than two. The FBI investigated the activity in the context of links between Trump associates and Russian officials and concluded that there were no such links and that there might be "an innocuous explanation, like marketing email or spam". This was undercut in 2021. Through September 2021, U.S. government investigators had been unable to explain the activity, which a 2018 analysis showed "reasons to doubt that marketing emails were the cause". A Senate report called it "unusual activity". Also in September 2021, The New York Times reported that researchers had found that a Russian-made YotaPhone smartphone, rarely used in the U.S., had accessed networks serving the White House, Trump Tower and Spectrum, which researchers reported to CIA counterintelligence in February 2017.
  - Trump becomes the only remaining candidate for the Republican presidential nomination when John Kasich withdraws.
  - Sater texts Cohen asking when he will be traveling to Moscow. He writes that he set expectations in Russia that it would probably be after the convention. Cohen responds that he expects to travel before the convention, and that Trump will travel after he becomes the nominee.
- May 5:
  - Papadopoulos forwards Timofeev's email to Clovis, who replies, "[t]here are legal issues we need to mitigate, meeting with foreign officials as a private citizen."
  - Sater texts Cohen that Peskov would like to invite him to the St. Petersburg Forum June 16–19 and possibly meet Putin or Russian Prime Minister Dmitry Medvedev. He continues, "He said anything you want to discuss including dates and subjects are on the table to discuss."
- May 6:
  - Sater texts Cohen to confirm his travel to Moscow around June 16–19. Cohen replies, "[w]orks for me."
  - Papadopoulos meets with Thompson.
- May 7: Kilimnik and Manafort meet for breakfast in New York City. According to Manafort, they discuss events in Ukraine, and Manafort gives Kilimnik a briefing on the Trump campaign with the expectation that Kilimnik will repeat the information to people in Ukraine and elsewhere. After the meeting, Manafort instructs Gates to begin passing internal campaign polling data and other updates to Kilimnik to share with Ukrainian oligarchs. Gates periodically sends the data using WhatsApp.
- May 8: Timofeev proposes connecting Papadopoulos with another Russian official.
- May 9: Thompson thanks Papadopoulos for meeting her the previous Friday, and they arrange for Papadopoulos to meet with her boss, Australian High Commissioner to London Alexander Downer, at the Kensington Wine Rooms in London.
- May 10:

  - Dearborn receives an email about arranging a back-channel meeting between Trump and Putin with the subject line "Kremlin Connection." It is sent from a conservative operative who says Russia wants to use the NRA's convention to make "first contact."
  - During their scheduled meeting at the Kensington Wine Rooms followed by the Waterway Pub, Papadopoulos drinks a lot and tells Downer and Thompson that the Russians have politically damaging material on Clinton. Later, Papadopoulos gives investigators conflicting accounts of how much alcohol Downer consumed. After WikiLeaks releases the DNC emails two months later, Australian officials pass this information to American officials, causing the FBI to open a counterintelligence investigation into the Trump campaign. See Crossfire Hurricane (FBI investigation).
- May 11: Downer informs Canberra of his interactions with Papadopoulos.
- May 14: Papadopoulos tells Lewandowski the Russians are interested in hosting Trump.
- May 15: David Klein, a distant relative of Trump Organization lawyer Jason Greenblatt, emails Clovis about a possible campaign meeting with Chief Rabbi of Russia Berel Lazar. Klein writes that he contacted Lazar in February about a possible meeting between Trump and Putin and that Lazar was "a very close confidante of Putin." Later Klein and Greenblatt meet with Lazar at Trump Tower.
- May 16:
  - Page floats with Clovis, Gordon, and Phares the idea of Trump going to Russia in his place to give the commencement speech at the New Economic School "to raise the temperature a little bit."
  - Dearborn receives a similar second proposal, which he forwards to Kushner, Manafort and Rick Gates. Both efforts (to arrange a back-channel meeting between Trump and Putin) appear to involve Alexander Torshin, who was instructed to make contact with the Trump campaign. Kushner rebuffs the proposal.
- May 18: The public are informed that both presidential campaigns are targeted by hackers: "'We're aware that campaigns and related organizations and individuals are targeted by actors with a variety of motivations — from philosophical differences to espionage — and capabilities — from defacements to intrusions,' said Brian P. Hale, director of public affairs for the Office of the Director of National Intelligence."
- May 19:
  - Manafort becomes Trump's campaign chairman and chief strategist. Gates is appointed deputy campaign chairman.
  - Mother Jones reports that before Trump launched his campaign in 2015, Lewandowski and other political advisors suggested to Trump that they follow standard practice and hire someone to perform opposition research on him. Trump refused.
- May 19–22: The NRA annual conference is held in Louisville, Kentucky. Trump and Trump Jr. attend. Brownell introduces Trump Jr. to Torshin and Butina during a brief encounter at an NRA fundraiser dinner on May 21. The next day, an attendee of the dinner warns Trump Jr. to stay away from Butina.
- May 21:
  - Papadopoulos forwards Timofeev's May 4 email to Manafort stressing the Russian Ministry of Foreign Affairs (MFA)'s desire to meet with Trump, writing, "Russia has been eager to meet Mr. Trump for quite sometime and have been reaching out to me to discuss." Manafort shoots down the idea in an email to Rick Gates, with a note: "Let[']s discuss. We need someone to communicate that DT is not doing these trips. It should be someone low level in the Campaign so as not to send any signal."
  - Two competing rallies are held in Houston to alternately protest against and defend the recently opened Library of Islamic Knowledge at the Islamic Da'wah Center. The "Stop Islamization of Texas" rally is organized by the Facebook group "Heart of Texas". The Facebook posting for the event encourages participants to bring guns. A spokesman for the group converses with the Houston Press via email but declines to give a name. The other rally, "Save Islamic Knowledge", is organized by the Facebook group "United Muslims of America" for the same time and location. Both Facebook groups are later revealed to be IRA accounts. The entire operation cost $200 and was entirely organized from St. Petersburg.
- May 22: Politico reports on Trump's past associations and dealings with the American Mafia and other criminal figures, including Sater.
- May 23: Sessions attends the CNI's Distinguished Service Award dinner at the Washington, D.C., Four Seasons Hotel. Kislyak is a confirmed guest with a reserved seat next to Sessions. In 2018, Sessions tells Mueller's team that he doesn't remember Kislyak being there, and other participants interviewed by Mueller's team disagree with each other about whether Kislyak was present.
- May 25:
  - The Westboro Baptist Church holds its annual protest of Lawrence High School graduation ceremonies in Lawrence, Kansas. The "LGBT United" Facebook group organizes counterprotesters to confront the Westboro protest, including by placing an ad on Facebook and contacting local people. About a dozen people show up. Lawrence High School students do not participate because they are "skeptical" of the counterprotest organizers. LGBT United is a Russian operatives account that appears to have been created specifically for this event.
  - Thousands of DNC emails are stolen.
- May 26: The Associated Press reports that Trump has secured enough delegates to become the presumptive Republican nominee.
- May 27: At a rally, Trump calls Putin "a strong leader."
- May 27–28: Putin makes an official visit to Greece and meets with government leaders. His visit overlaps with a trip to Greece by Papadopoulos.
- May 29: The IRA hires an American to pose in front of the White House holding a sign that says, "Happy 55th Birthday, Dear Boss." "Boss" is a reference to Russian oligarch Yevgeny Prigozhin.
- May 30: The IRA creates the @march_for_trump Twitter account to promote IRA-organized rallies in support of the Trump campaign.

=== June 2016 ===
- June:
  - Around this time, the conspirators charged in the July 2018 indictment stage and release tens of thousands of stolen emails and documents using fictitious online personas, including "DCLeaks" and "Guccifer 2.0".
  - The FBI sends a warning to states about "bad actors" probing state voter-registration databases and systems to seek vulnerabilities; investigators believe Russia is responsible.
  - Fusion GPS hires Steele to research Trump's activities in Russia. A resultant 35-page document, later known as the Trump–Russia dossier or Steele dossier, is published on January 10, 2017, by BuzzFeed News.
  - A former GRU officer arranges for Felix Sater and Michael Cohen to attend the St. Petersburg International Economic Forum, which Putin regularly attends. Sater wants to use the trip to push forward the Moscow Trump Tower deal. Cohen cancels at the last minute. Sater does not attend the forum.
- Early June:
  - At a closed-door gathering of foreign policy experts visiting with the Prime Minister of India, Page hails Putin as stronger and more reliable than Obama and touts the positive effect a Trump presidency would have on U.S.–Russia relations.
  - Before traveling to New York to translate at the June 9 Trump Tower meeting, Kaveladze contacts Roman Beniaminov, a close friend and aide of Emin Agalarov, to find out why Kushner, Manafort, and Trump Jr. were invited to a meeting ostensibly about the Magnitsky Act. Beniaminov tells Kaveladze that he heard Goldstone and Agalarov discuss "dirt" on Clinton. In November 2017, Kaveladze's lawyer tells The Daily Beast that Beniaminov was Kaveladze's only source of information about the meeting.
- June 1:
  - Papadopoulos emails Lewandowski asking whether he wants to have a call about a Russia visit and whether "we were following up with it." Lewandowski refers him to Clovis. Papadopoulos emails Clovis about more interest from the Russian Ministry of Foreign Affairs to set up a Trump meeting in Russia. He writes, "I have the Russian MFA asking me if Mr. Trump is interested in visiting Russia at some point." He continues that he "[w]anted to pass this info along to you for you to decide what's best to do with it and what message I should send (or to ignore)."
  - The IRA plans a Manhattan rally called "March for Trump" and buys Facebook ads promoting the event.
- June 3:
  - Aras Agalarov is told that the Russian government wants to give the Trump campaign damaging information about Clinton.
  - Goldstone emails Trump Jr. offering, on behalf of Emin Agalarov, to meet an alleged Russian government official who "would incriminate Hillary and her dealings with Russia and would be very useful to your father", as "part of Russia and its government's support for Mr. Trump." Trump Jr. responded 17 minutes later: "If it's what you say I love it especially later in the summer," and schedules the meeting. Goldstone also offers to relay the information to Trump through his assistant. This is the second time a Trump campaign official was told of "dirt" on Clinton. The first time was April 26.
  - $3.3 million began moving between Aras Agalarov and Kaveladze, a longtime Agalarov employee once investigated for money laundering.
- June 4: The IRA email account allforusa@yahoo.com sends news releases about the "March for Trump" rally to New York City media outlets.
- June 5: The IRA contacts a Trump campaign volunteer to provide signs for the "March for Trump" rally.
- June 6:
  - Hillary Clinton becomes the presumptive Democratic nominee.
  - Trump Jr. calls two blocked numbers at Trump Tower. According to CNN, the two people Trump Jr. called were NASCAR CEO Brian France and businessman Howard Lorber.
  - At a primary night rally in New York, Trump promises a speech discussing information about Clinton. Trump says "I am going to give a major speech on probably Monday of next week [June 13], and we are going to be discussing all of the things that have taken place with the Clintons".
  - Goldstone follows up with Trump Jr. about when Jr. can "talk with Emin by phone about this Hillary info." Trump Jr. calls Emin. Phone records show Trump Jr. called a blocked number before and after calls to Emin.
  - According to Gates, Trump Jr. informs the participants in a regular senior campaign staff meeting that he has a lead on damaging information about the Clinton Foundation. Gates is under the impression that the information is coming from a group in Kyrgyzstan. The other meeting participants include Eric Trump, Ivanka Trump, Kushner, Manafort, and Hicks. Manafort, according to Gates, warns the group to be careful. In April 2018, Kushner tells Mueller's team that he doesn't remember the information being discussed before the June 9 meeting.
- June 6–7: Trump Jr. and Emin Agalarov discuss setting up their June 9 meeting in three phone calls.
- June 8: The DCLeaks website comes online. The Russian-controlled fake American personas "Melvin Redick", "Alice Donovan", and "Katherine Fulton" begin promoting the site on Facebook.
- June 9:
  - Veselnitskaya, Akhmetshin, Kaveladze, and Anatoli Samochornov meet for lunch and discuss what to say at the upcoming Trump Tower meeting.
  - Kushner, Manafort and Trump Jr. meet at Trump Tower with Goldstone, Veselnitskaya, Akhmetshin, Kaveladze, and translator Samochornov. Veselnitskaya is best known for lobbying against the Magnitsky Act, an American law that blacklists suspected Russian human rights abusers. Trump Jr. later says that he asked Veselnitskaya for damaging information about the Clinton Foundation and that she had none. Samochornov, Kaveladze, and Akhmetshin later tell the Senate Judiciary Committee that Trump Jr. told Veselnitskaya to come back after they won the election. The meeting lasts approximately 20 minutes, and Manafort takes notes on his phone. Trump Jr. calls a blocked number before (June 6) and after the meeting. Trump spends the day at Trump Tower, where the private residence has a blocked number, and holds no public events.
  - That night, Veselnitskaya, Simpson, Akhmetshin, and others attend a dinner in New York City organized by a lawyer at BakerHostetler. BakerHostetler hired Simpson in 2015 to work on the Prevezon case with Veselnitskaya. Later, Simpson tells the Senate Intelligence Committee that he was unaware of the Trump Tower meeting until it became public in 2017.
- June 9–14: Sater repeatedly tries to get Cohen to confirm his trip to Russia.
- June 11–12: The DNC expels Russian hackers from its servers. Some of the hackers had been accessing the DNC network for over a year.
- June 12: On ITV, Assange tells Robert Peston on his television show Peston on Sunday that emails related to Clinton are "pending publication" and says, "WikiLeaks has a very good year ahead."
- June 12 – July 22: According to Gates, prior to Assange's announcement, Stone tells him that something "big" related to leaked information is coming soon, and repeats the claim multiple times to Gates and Manafort through July 22.
- June 14:
  - The DNC publicly alleges that they have been hacked by Russian state-backed hackers. Following this news, a small group of politically diverse prominent computer scientists scattered across the U.S., including a member Dexter Filkins calls "Max" in his October 2018 New Yorker article, begin combing the Domain Name System (DNS).
  - Sater meets Cohen in the Trump Tower lobby. Cohen tells him he will not be traveling to Russia (two days before planned departure). Cohen decided not to go because he didn't receive a formal invitation from Peskov.
  - The GRU uses its @dcleaks_ persona to reach out to WikiLeaks and offer to coordinate the release of sensitive information about Clinton, including financial documents.
  - GRU Unit 74455 (Fancy Bear) creates the Guccifer 2.0 persona and a WordPress blog for disseminating stolen DNC material.
  - Fancy Bear registers the domain name ActBlues.com for a website that is nearly identical to the DCCC's donation page on ActBlue.com.
- Mid June:
  - Shortly after the DNC announced that it had been hacked, the RNC informs the FBI that some Republican campaign email accounts hosted by Smartech have been hacked. Compromised accounts include the campaign committees of "Senator John McCain, Senator Lindsey Graham, [...] Representative Robert Hurt[,] [s]everal state GOP organizations, Republican PACs, and campaign consultants." Approximately 300 emails from May through October 2015 are eventually posted on DCLeaks.com.
  - Someone breaks into and ransacks two of Chalupa's cars, but valuables and cash are left in the vehicles. A few days later, a woman "wearing white flowers in her hair" tries to break into Chalupa's home. Aide to the Ukrainian ambassador Oksana Shulyar tells her the incidents are similar to Russian intimidation campaigns against foreigners.
- June 15:
  - "Guccifer 2.0" (GRU) claims credit for the DNC hacking and posts some of the stolen material to a website. CrowdStrike stands by its "findings identifying two separate Russian intelligence-affiliated adversaries present in the DNC network in May 2016."
  - Gawker publishes an opposition research document on Trump that was stolen from the DNC. "Guccifer 2.0" sent the file to Gawker.
  - House Majority Leader Kevin McCarthy and House Speaker Paul Ryan meet separately with Ukrainian Prime Minister Volodymyr Groysman at the Capitol. Groysman describes to them how the Kremlin is financing populist politicians in Eastern Europe to damage democratic institutions. McCarthy and Ryan have a private meeting afterwards with GOP leaders that is secretly recorded. Toward the end of their conversation, after laughing at the DNC hacking, McCarthy says, "there's two people, I think, Putin pays: Rohrabacher and Trump...[laughter]...swear to God." Ryan then tells everyone to keep this conversation secret. A transcript of the recording becomes public a year later.
- June 16: Cassandra Ford of Defiance, Ohio, renames her Twitter account "@Guccifer2" after hearing about Guccifer 2.0 from her Twitter friends. A few days later, the GRU registers "@Guccifer_2" for the Guccifer 2.0 persona because @Guccifer2 was taken.
- June 17: ThreatConnect publishes its analysis of the CrowdStrike report on the DNC hack. The new report provides additional data implicating Fancy Bear.
- Late June: According to Gates, Trump and Stone discuss by phone the recent release of stolen DNC material while Trump and Gates are being driven from Trump Tower to La Guardia airport. After the call, Trump tells Gates that there will be more releases of damaging information.
- June 19:
  - After communicating with the MFA via email and Skype, Papadopoulos tells Lewandowski by email that the MFA is interested in meeting with a "campaign rep" if Trump can't meet with them. Papadopoulos offers to go in an unofficial capacity.
  - Page again requests permission from the campaign to speak at the New Economic School commencement in Moscow, and reiterates that the school "would love to have Mr. Trump speak at this annual celebration." Lewandowski responds that Page can attend in his personal capacity but "Mr. Trump will not be able to attend."
  - Assange asks the London Ecuadorian Embassy for a faster Internet connection. Embassy staff help Assange install new equipment.
- June 20:
  - Aras Agalarov wires more than $19.5 million to his account at a bank in New York.
  - Trump fires Lewandowski. Manafort becomes campaign manager.
  - The first report in the Steele dossier is written. It alleges secretive and multi-faceted cooperation between the Trump campaign and the Russian government aimed at getting Trump elected. It alleged that Vladimir Putin favored Trump over Hillary Clinton; that he personally ordered an "influence campaign" to harm Clinton's campaign and to "undermine public faith in the US democratic process"; that he ordered cyberattacks on both parties; and that many Trump campaign officials and associates had numerous secretive contacts with Russian officials and agents. In 2019, Matthew Rosenberg of The New York Times described some allegations in the dossier as "prescient", while adding that "[o]ther parts of the dossier remain unsubstantiated, or nearly impossible to verify". Many allegations in the dossier have been widely discredited.
- June 22: WikiLeaks reaches out to "Guccifer 2.0" via Twitter. They ask "Guccifer 2.0" to send them material because it will have a bigger impact if they publish it. They also specifically ask for material on Clinton they can publish before the convention.
- June 23:
  - The United Kingdom passes a referendum to leave the European Union.
  - The IRA persona "Matt Skiber" contacts an American to recruit for the "March for Trump" rally.
  - Russian-American Simon Kukes donates $100,000 to the Trump Victory fund, later included in the Mueller investigation.
  - GRU hackers successfully use an SQL injection attack to breach servers belonging to the Illinois State Board of Elections and steal voter registration data.
- June 24: The IRA group "United Muslims of America" buys Facebook ads for the "Support Hillary, Save American Muslims" rally.
- June 25:
  - The IRA's "March for Trump" rally occurs.
  - The IRA Facebook group LGBT United organizes a candlelight vigil for the Pulse nightclub shooting victims in Orlando, Florida.
- June 29: Goldstone emails Trump campaign social media director Dan Scavino about promoting Trump on VKontakte. He says the email is a follow-up to his recent conversation with Trump Jr. and Manafort.
- Summer:
  - IRA employees use the stolen identities of four Americans to open PayPal and bank accounts to act as conduits for funding their activities in the United States.
  - The FBI applies for a FISA warrant to monitor communications of four Trump campaign officials. The FISA Court rejects the application, asking the FBI to narrow its scope. A warrant on Carter Page alone is granted in October 2016.
  - Lawyer and Trump campaign foreign policy advisor Joseph E. Schmitz receives a cache of emails from a client that is purported to be Clinton's deleted 30,000 emails, acquired from a dark web forum. Schmitz meets with officials at the FBI, the State Department, and the Intelligence Community Inspector General (ICIG) in an effort to get the emails reviewed. The State Department and ICIG decline to review the emails. Schmitz's efforts are independent of the investigation by Peter Smith's team.

== July 2016 and after ==
=== Investigations' continuing timelines ===
- Timeline of investigations into Donald Trump and Russia (January–June 2017)
- Timeline of investigations into Donald Trump and Russia (July–December 2017)
- Timeline of investigations into Donald Trump and Russia (January–June 2018)
- Timeline of investigations into Donald Trump and Russia (July–December 2018)
- Timeline of investigations into Donald Trump and Russia (2019)
- Timeline of investigations into Donald Trump and Russia (2020–2022)

== Related continuing interference ==
- Russian interference in the 2018 United States elections
- Russian interference in the 2020 United States elections

== See also ==
- Assessing Russian Activities and Intentions in Recent US Elections intelligence report
- Business projects of Donald Trump in Russia
- Cyberwarfare by Russia
- Donald Trump's disclosure of classified information to Russia
- Efforts to impeach Donald Trump
- Foreign electoral intervention
- Inspector General report on FBI and DOJ actions in the 2016 election
- Propaganda in the Russian Federation
- Russian espionage in the United States
- Russian interference in the 2016 Brexit referendum
- Social media in the 2016 United States presidential election
- Timelines related to Donald Trump and Russian interference in United States elections
- Topical timeline of Russian interference in the 2016 United States elections
