= Business projects of Donald Trump in Russia =

Political controversy of US President

Donald Trump has pursued business deals in Russia since 1987, and has repeatedly traveled there to explore potential business opportunities. In 1996, Trump trademark applications were submitted for potential Russian real estate development deals. Trump, his children, and his partners have repeatedly visited Russia, connecting with real estate developers and Russian government officials to explore joint venture opportunities. Trump was never able to successfully conclude any real estate deals in Russia. However, individual Russians have invested heavily in Trump properties, and, following Trump's bankruptcies in the 1990s, he borrowed money from Russian sources. Both Donald Trump Jr. and Eric Trump have said that Russia was an important source of money for the Trump businesses.

Efforts to build a Trump building in Moscow continued into June 2016 while Trump was securing the Republican nomination for the presidential election.

In January 2017, BuzzFeed News reported the existence of the then-unverified Steele dossier (also called the Trump–Russia dossier), which alleges connections between Trump associates and Russia. Trump responded the next day, and again at a February news conference, that he has no financial connections to Russia. In response to ongoing questions, White House press secretary Sean Spicer reiterated in May that Trump has no business connections to Russia. Also in May, Trump's tax lawyers sent a letter to the Senate Judiciary Committee saying Trump had not received any income from Russian sources over the past 10 years "with a few exceptions".

Trump's pre-Presidential business dealings with Russia were scrutinized by the special counsel, Robert Mueller.

== Becoming well known ==
In 1987, Trump visited Russia to investigate developing a hotel, invited by Ambassador Yuri Dubinin whom he had met in New York the year before. British journalist Luke Harding alleged in 2017 that this trip likely began a long-term cultivation operation typical of the KGB's Political Intelligence Department, under written directives initiated by First Chief Directorate head Vladimir Kryuchkov, to recruit politically ambitious Westerners susceptible to flattery, egotism and greed.

In 1996, Trump partnered with Liggett-Ducat, a small company, and planned to build an upscale residential development on a Liggett-Ducat property in Moscow. Trump commissioned New York architect Ted Liebman, who did the sketches. Trump visited Moscow again with Howard Lorber to scout potential properties for "skyscrapers and hotels". During that trip, Trump promoted the proposal and acclaimed the Russian economic market. At a news conference reported by The Moscow Times, Trump said he had not been "as impressed with the potential of a city as I have been with Moscow" in contrast to other cities had visited "all over the world."

By this time, Trump had made known his desire to build in Moscow to government officials for almost ten years "ranging from the Soviet leader Mikhail S. Gorbachev (they first met in Washington in 1987) to the military figure Alexander Lebed." Moscow's mayor, Yuri M. Luzhkov, showed Trump plans for a very large shopping mall to be located underground in the vicinity of the Kremlin. The mayor complimented Trump's suggestion that this mall should have access to the Moscow Metro, and it was eventually connected to the Okhotny Ryad station. Although the 1996 residential development did not happen, Trump was by this time well known in Russia.

== Projects ==
Trump's business strategy included Russia in ventures intended to internationally expand his brand. He transitioned in the mid-2000s from building and investing in real estate to simply licensing his name to hotels, condominiums, and commercial towers. Although a strategy of taking a percentage from the sales was successful in other countries, Trump's terms were not agreeable to Russians and conflicted with their way of doing business with American hotel chains.

From 2000 to 2010, Trump partnered with a development company headquartered in New York represented by a Russian immigrant, Felix Sater. During this period, they partnered for an assortment of deals that included building Trump towers internationally. For example, in 2005 Sater acted as an agent for building a Trump tower alongside Moscow River with letters of intent in hand and "square footage was being analyzed."

In 2006, Trump's children Donald Jr. and Ivanka, traveling with Sater, stayed in the Hotel National, Moscow for several days, across from the Kremlin, to see promising partners, with the intent of doing real estate development deals.

Trump was associated with Tevfik Arif, formerly a Soviet commerce official and founder of a development company called the Bayrock Group, of which Sater was also a partner. Bayrock searched for deals in Russia while Trump branded towers were attempting to further expand in the United States. Sater said, "We looked at some very, very large properties in Russia," on the scale of "...a large Vegas high-rise." In 2007, Bayrock organized a potential deal in Moscow between Trump International Hotel and Russian investors.

During 2006–2008, Trump's company applied for a number of trademarks in Russia with the goal of real estate developments. These trademark applications include: Trump, Trump Tower, Trump International Hotel and Tower, and Trump Home. In 2008, he said as a speaker at a Manhattan real estate conference that he feared the outcome of doing business deals in Russia, but he preferred "Moscow over all cities in the world" and that within 18 months he had been in Russia a half-dozen times.

In 2007, Trump announced that Trump Vodka would expand its distribution into Russia, his first foray into the Russian market. Trump "Super Premium" Vodka, with bottles glazed in 24-karat gold, debuted in 2007 at the Millionaire Fair in Moscow, but was only successful until 2009. Trump also attempted to create a reality show in St. Petersburg starring a Russian athlete, but the project was unsuccessful.

In a 2015 interview, Trump said that his repeated attempts to launch business deals with Russians resulted in contacts with "...the top-level people, both oligarchs and generals, and top of the government people. I can't go further than that, but I will tell you that I met the top people, and the relationship was extraordinary."

Efforts to build Trump Tower Moscow continued through June 2016, even as Trump was becoming the Republican presidential nominee. In 2018, Trump's personal lawyer Michael Cohen pleaded guilty to lying to Congress after having falsely testified in 2017 that these efforts had ended in January 2016. After June 2016, Trump denied several times having business dealings in or with Russia: in July 2016 he denied having employees or investments in Russia, and in October 2016 he said he was not doing any deals there and had nothing to do with Russia. The president's attorney Rudy Giuliani made some contrary statements about that chronology, but then backtracked.

On July 9, 2019, Sater acknowledged before the House Intelligence Committee that one real estate project between Russia and Trump was falsely presented as a joint defense agreement, but withheld documents concerning direct details and phone records. Following his testimony, Committee chair Patrick Boland announced "Our investigation thus far has revealed that Sater was not a part of any joint defense agreement, and has no basis to assert this privilege over these documents."

== Trump's responses ==
On January 10, 2017, BuzzFeed News published the Steele dossier (also called the Trump–Russia dossier), a series of reports prepared by a private intelligence source in Great Britain. The unverified dossier alleged various connections and collusion between Trump associates and Russia before and during the 2016 presidential election. The next day, January 11, Trump tweeted, "Russia has never tried to use leverage over me. I HAVE NOTHING TO DO WITH RUSSIA – NO DEALS, NO LOANS, NO NOTHING!" USA Today evaluated that assertion as "not exactly true". At a February 16, 2017, press conference, Trump said, "And I can tell you, speaking for myself, I own nothing in Russia. I have no loans in Russia. I don't have any deals in Russia."

On May 9, White House Press Secretary Sean Spicer said, "He [Trump] has no business in Russia. He has no connections to Russia."

515 N. County Road in Palm Beach, Florida, before its demolition

On May 9, 2017, Trump's tax law firm, Morgan, Lewis & Bockius, sent a letter to the Senate Judiciary Committee, which said a review of Trump's tax returns for the past 10 years did not find income from Russian sources during that period, save for "a few exceptions". The exceptions were the 2008 sale of a Trump-owned 6.26-acre (2.53 ha) estate in Palm Beach, Florida, for $95 million to Russian billionaire Dmitry Rybolovlev, who tore down the 62,000-square-foot (5,800 m^{2}) mansion shortly after and sold 2.72 acres (1.10 ha) of the site for $34 million, as well as $12.2 million in payments in connection with holding the Miss Universe pageant in Moscow in 2013, plus a number of "immaterial" deals. No independently verifiable evidence was provided, such as tax returns, and it has been noted that even disclosure of tax returns would not necessarily disclose Russian-source income. The letter also said Trump had received undisclosed payments over 10 years from Russians for hotel rooms, rounds of golf, or Trump-licensed products such as wine, ties, or mattresses, which would not have been identified as coming from Russian sources in the tax returns. The letter was a response to earlier requests from Senator Lindsey Graham asking whether there were any such ties.

On November 30, 2018, a day after Trump's personal lawyer Michael Cohen pleaded guilty to lying to Congress about Trump's business projects in Russia, Trump tweeted that it was "very legal & very cool" that he did "run for President & continue to run my business". Trump continued: "Lightly looked at doing a building somewhere in Russia. Put up zero money, zero guarantees and didn't do the project."

== Timeline of Trump business activities related to Russia ==
- 1984: Russian mobster David Bogatin bought five condominiums from Trump tower for $6 million. The condos were later seized by the government, which claimed they were used to launder money for the Russian mafia. Bogatin was a convicted gasoline bootlegger, and close ally of Semion Mogilevich, a major Russian mafia boss.
- 1986: Soviet Ambassador Yuri Dubinin invites Trump on an all-expenses-paid trip to the Soviet Union.
- July 1987: Trump and his wife, Ivana, who speaks Russian, make their first visit to the Soviet Union (which included the Russian Soviet Federative Socialist Republic [RSFSR]). They scout potential construction sites for a Trump Tower Moscow.
- 1996: Trump returns to Russia, visits Moscow with Howard Lorber and Bennett S. LeBow to scout potential properties for "skyscrapers and hotels", registers his trademark, and makes connections with the development company Bayrock Group (which would result in Trump Soho) and Felix Sater, who became crucial to later Trump Moscow talks. Trump subsequently announces a plan to invest $250 million in Russia and brand two luxury residential buildings in Moscow, which doesn't come to fruition.
- 2005: Trump gives Bayrock Group an exclusive deal to build a Trump-branded property in Moscow.
- 2006: At Donald Trump's request, Sater accompanies Ivanka Trump and Donald Trump Jr. on a Moscow trip, and arranges for Ivanka to sit in Putin's office chair during a tour of the Kremlin.
- November 2007: Trump attends the Millionaire's Fair in Moscow, where he announces that Trump Vodka will expand its distribution into Russia, his first foray into the Russian market.
- Around 2008: Trump Jr. travels to Russia a half-dozen times in 18 months, looking for deals.
- July 2008: Trump sells the Palm Beach estate Maison de L'Amitie to Russian oligarch Dmitry Rybolovlev for a record $95 million. Trump bought the property for $41.35 million three years earlier and made only minor improvements.
- September 2008: Trump Jr., then an executive vice president of the Trump Organization, says, "Russians make up a pretty disproportionate cross-section of a lot of our assets, say, in Dubai, and certainly with our project in SoHo and anywhere in New York. We see a lot of money pouring in from Russia."
- 2010: The Trump International Hotel and Tower in Toronto receives timely financing from Vnesheconombank (VEB), a Russian state-run investment bank.

2013

- August: Eric Trump tells author James Dodson, "We don't rely on American banks [...] We have all the funding we need out of Russia", and says, "We go there all the time".
- November 9–11: The Trump-owned Miss Universe pageant is held in Moscow, sponsored by Sberbank. According to various reports, the event's $20 million licensing fee is paid by a Moscow real estate development firm called the Crocus Group, whose president is Aras Agalarov and vice president is his son, pop singer Emin Agalarov. One VIP guest is Alimzhan Tokhtakhounov, an alleged Russian mobster and fugitive who was recently indicted for running a high-stakes illegal gambling ring out of a Trump Tower apartment in New York City. While Putin does not attend, the event is attended by Vladimir Kozhin, the head of the Kremlin's property department, which is responsible for development projects. After the event, Trump tells Real Estate Weekly, "the Russian market is attracted to me. I have a great relationship with many Russians". During the trip, Trump meets Herman Gref, the CEO of state-controlled Sberbank, Russia's largest bank, and other oligarchs close to Putin. Agalarov and Gref co-host a dinner for Trump at the Moscow branch of Nobu, which is owned by Agalarov. Afterwards, Trump tweets to Agalarov, "I had a great weekend with you and your family. You have done a FANTASTIC job. TRUMP TOWER-MOSCOW is next."
- November 12: The Moscow Times reports that Trump is in talks with Russian companies to build a new Trump tower in Moscow.
- December 23: Trump, Trump Jr., Emin Agalarov, and Kaveladze reach an agreement for the Trump Tower Moscow project under which the Trump Organization would receive a 3.5% commission on all sales.

2014

- Before January 24: The Crocus Group sends The Trump Organization a proposal to build a 194-meter tall building with 800 units at the Crocus City site in Moscow where the Miss Universe pageant was held.
- February 1–4: Kushner and Ivanka Trump travel to Russia on a four-day trip at the invitation of Dasha Zhukova, a longtime friend of Ivanka and the wife of Russian oligarch Roman Abramovich. They attend a gala fundraiser for the Jewish Museum and Tolerance Center in Moscow along with Vekselberg, other oligarchs, Russian government officials, and their families. Ivanka and Emin Agalarov tour the proposed Trump Tower Moscow site at Crocus City. In 2016–17, Kushner omits the trip from his security clearance applications.
- June 3–16: Kaveladze emails Trump Jr. and others about design elements and architectural details for Trump Tower Moscow.
- July 7: The Trump Organization sends Crocus Group a set of questions about the "demographics of these prospective buyers" in the area around the proposed Trump Tower Moscow site, the development of neighboring parcels, and concepts for redesigning portions of the building.
- August 4: The Trump Organization requests from Crocus Group the specifications for a Marriott-branded tower under construction near Crocus City.

2015

- September: A New York architect completes plans for a bold glass obelisk 100 stories high in Moscow, with the Trump logo on multiple sides.
- Late September: Felix Sater meets with Michael Cohen on behalf of I.C. Expert Investment Company to discuss building a Trump Tower in Moscow. I.C. Expert is a Russian real estate development corporation controlled by Andrei Vladimirovich Rozov. Sater agrees to find a developer and arrange for financing. Sater later contacts Rozov to propose that I.C. Expert work with the Trump Organization on the project.
- September 22: Cohen forwards a Trump Tower Moscow preliminary design study to Giorgi Rtskhiladze, who then emails it to his associate Simon Nizharadze, writing, "[i]f we could organize the meeting in New York at the highest level of the Russian Government and Mr. Trump this project would definitely receive the worldwide attention."
- September 24: Rtskhiladze emails Cohen a draft letter for the Trump Organization to send to the mayor of Moscow, explaining, "[w]e need to send this letter to the Mayor of Moscow (second guy in Russia) he is aware of the potential project and will pledge his support." Later that day he sends Cohen a translation of the letter that describes Trump Tower Moscow as a "symbol of stronger economic, business and cultural relationships between New York and Moscow and therefore United States and the Russian Federation."
- September 27: Rtskhiladze emails Cohen a proposal for the Trump Organization to partner with Global Development Group LLC on the Trump Tower Moscow project. He describes Global Development as controlled by Nizharadze and the architect Michail Posikhin. In September 2018 Cohen tells Mueller's team that he declined the proposal and decided to continue with Sater's proposed partner, I.C. Expert Investment Company.
- October 9: Sater emails Cohen about his plans to meet with and persuade Andrey Molchanov to provide the land for a Trump Tower in Moscow.
- October 12: Cohen has a series of email exchanges with Felix Sater about developing a Trump property in Moscow.
- July 24: Rob Goldstone emails Trump's assistant Rhona Graff, suggesting that Emin Agalarov could arrange a meeting between Putin and Trump. Sater tells Cohen that VTB Bank will fund the project, and that his associates will be meeting with Putin and a deputy on October 14.
- October 13: Sater sends Cohen a letter of intent signed by Andrey Rozov for Trump to sign in order to move the Moscow project forward.
- October 28: Trump signs a letter of intent {LOI} to construct a Trump-branded building in Moscow hours before the third Republican presidential debate, a fact made public in August 2017. The LOI proposes that the tower have "[a]pproximately 250 first class, luxury residential condominiums" and "[o]ne first class, luxury hotel consisting of approximately 15 floors and containing not fewer than 150 hotel rooms." The Trump Organization would receive 1–5% of all condominium sales and 3% of all rental and other revenues, and 20% of the operating profit.
- November: Trump associate Felix Sater emails Trump lawyer Michael Cohen: "Michael, I arranged for Ivanka to sit in Putin's private chair at his desk and office in the Kremlin [...] Our boy can become president of the USA and we can engineer it. I will get all of Putin's team to buy in on this". Sater also tells Cohen that the Kremlin's VTB Bank is ready to finance a Trump Tower project in Moscow.
- November 3: In an email to Cohen, Sater predicts that building a Trump Tower in Moscow will help Trump's presidential campaign. "I will get Putin on this program and we will get Donald elected."
- November 18: IC Expert, the developer for the Trump Tower Moscow project and a signatory to Trump's letter of intent, receives a non-revolving line of credit from Sberbank for 10.6 billion rubles. IC Expert provides 100% of its equity to secure the line of credit. Sberbank agrees to finance 70% of the project, its largest commercial real estate loan to date.
- November 19: Kolokov writes in an email to Cohen that a properly publicized meeting between Trump and Putin could have a "phenomenal" impact "in a business dimension" and boost the "level" of projects if he receives Putin's endorsement. Cohen rejects Kolokov's offers, writing, "[c]urrently our LOI developer is in talks with VP's Chief of Staff and arranging a formal invite for the two to meet." In September 2018, Cohen tells Mueller's team that he rejected the offers because he was already pursuing business with Sater and understood Sater had Russian government connections of his own.
- December 2: Trump tells the Associated Press that he is "not that familiar with" Felix Sater and refers questions to his staff.
- December 10: ABC News reports that Trump denied knowing Sater under oath in a 2013 video deposition even though Sater was involved in several of his high-profile projects. Trump testified, "If he were sitting in the room right now, I really wouldn't know what he looked like." On December 30, Sater tells Cohen that he helped bury the story.
- December 19: In an email to Cohen, Sater talks about securing financing from VTB, a Russian bank under American sanctions. Sater also asks for Cohen's and Trump's passport information so that VTB can facilitate obtaining visas. VTB would be issuing the invitation, he writes, because "[p]olitically neither Putins office nor Ministry of Foreign Affairs cannot issue invite, so they are inviting commercially/ business." He writes that they will be invited to the Russian consulate that week to receive an invitation and visas for traveling to Russia. Cohen sends images of his own passport but not Trump's.
- December 21: Sater texts Cohen asking again for a copy of Trump's passport. Cohen replies, "After I return from Moscow with you with a date for him." In September 2018 Cohen tells Mueller's team that Rhona Graff provided Trump's passport to Cohen's office, but the Mueller Report says the team could not find any evidence of a copy being sent to Sater.
- December 30: Cohen emails Sater complaining about the lack of progress on the Trump Tower Moscow project. Sater responds that he helped bury an ABC News story in which Trump denied knowing him. Cohen tells Sater in a text message that he will set up a meeting with Russian government officials himself."
- December 31: Sater tells Cohen that Genbank (Генбанк), recently put under U.S. sanctions, will be the new funder for the Trump Tower Moscow project.
- Late 2015 – early 2016: Trump Jr. and Ivanka Trump are included on emails about the Trump Tower Moscow project. Ivanka Trump recommends an architect.

2016

- January 14: Cohen emails Peskov atinfo@prpress.gov.ru seeking help to jump-start the Trump Tower Moscow project because "the communication between our two sides has stalled", but does not receive a response. In August 2017 Peskov tells CNN that Cohen's email "went unanswered [because it] was solely regarding a real estate deal and nothing more."
- January 16: Cohen emails at Peskov at Pr_peskov@prpress.gov.ru, the correct address he mistyped on January 11, and repeats his request to speak with Ivanov. Later Cohen tells Congress and Mueller's team that he received no response to this email and abandoned the Trump Moscow Project. He later admits to federal prosecutors that he did receive a response and continued working on the project and keeping Trump updated on progress into June 2016.
- January 20: Peskov's personal assistant Elena Polikova sends an email to Cohen from her personal account asking him to call her on her personal phone number, which she provides. Cohen calls her and explains the nature and status of the project, and asks for assistance with securing land and financing. The conversation includes a discussion of giving Putin a $50 million penthouse in the tower as a gift. Later Cohen tells prosecutors that Polikova took notes, asked detailed questions, and said she needed to follow up with people in Russia.
- January 21: Sater texts Cohen asking for a call. He writes, "It's about Putin they called today." Sater emails Cohen a draft invitation from Genbank for Cohen to visit Russia, which Sater says is being offered at the behest of VTB, and asks Cohen if any changes need to be made. Sater and Cohen work on edits for the next few days.
- January 25: Sater sends Cohen a signed invitation from Andrey Ryabinskiy of the company MHJ to travel to "Moscow for a working visit" about the "prospects of development and the construction business in Russia," "the various land plots available suited for construction of this enormous Tower," and "the opportunity to co-ordinate a follow-up visit to Moscow by Mr. Donald Trump." In September 2018 Cohen tells Mueller's team that he didn't use the invitation to travel to Moscow because he didn't receive any concrete proposals for suitable land plots.
- January 26: Sater asks Cohen to take a call from Evgeny Shmykov, who is coordinating their project in Moscow. Cohen agrees.
- February 2: Trump comes in second in the Iowa caucuses. In 2017 Cohen asserts that all efforts on the Trump Tower Moscow project ended before this date.
- April 20: Sater texts Cohen asking when he is going to travel to Moscow.
- May 4: Sater texts Cohen asking when he will be traveling to Moscow. He writes that he set expectations in Russia that it would probably be after the convention. Cohen responds that he expects to travel before the convention, and that Trump will travel after he becomes the nominee.
- May 5: Sater texts Cohen that Peskov would like to invite him to the St. Petersburg Forum June 16–19 and possibly meet Putin or Russian Prime Minister Dmitry Medvedev. He continues, "He said anything you want to discuss including dates and subjects are on the table to discuss."
- May 22: Politico reports on Trump's past associations and dealings with the American Mafia and other criminal figures, including Sater.
- June: A former GRU officer arranges for Felix Sater and Michael Cohen to attend the St. Petersburg International Economic Forum, which Putin regularly attends. Sater wants to use the trip to push forward the Moscow Trump Tower deal. Cohen cancels at the last minute. Sater does not attend the forum.
- June 14: Sater meets Cohen in the Trump Tower lobby. Cohen tells him he will not be traveling to Russia (two days before planned departure).
- July 19: Steele files a dossier memo alleging that during his Moscow trip, Page met Rosneft chairman Igor Sechin, and discussed the possible lifting of sanctions against Russia. In his congressional testimony, Page denies meeting with the Russians named in the dossier. He says he met Sechin's associate Andrey Baranov, but says "nothing that this gentleman said to me ever implied or asked for anything related to sanctions. Again, there may have been some general reference ... but no kind of negotiations in any format".
- July 26: Trump denies having any investments in Russia.
- July 27: Trump tells a CBS affiliate in Miami, "I have nothing to do with Russia. Nothing to do. I never met Putin. I have nothing to do with Russia whatsoever." This contradicts his many claims since 2013 to have met Putin and done business in Russia.
- August 13: Russian-American Simon Kukes attends a $25,000-per-ticket Trump fundraising dinner at the home of Woody Johnson in New York. Kukes's 2016 political donations become a subject of the Mueller investigation.
- October 8: Kushner's company receives $370 million in new loans, including $285 million from Deutsche Bank, to refinance his portion of the former New York Times building. The size and timing of the Deutsche Bank loan draws scrutiny from the House Financial Services Committee, the Justice Department, and, later, the Mueller investigation. The concern is that the transaction may be related to Russian money laundering through Deutsche Bank.
- October 11: Trump Jr. travels to Paris to give a paid speech at the Ritz Hotel. The dinner event is sponsored by the Center of Political and Foreign Affairs, a group founded by Fabien Baussart and his business partner. Baussart is openly linked to Russian government officials. Randa Kassis, one of the hosts, travels to Moscow after the election and reports the details of the event to Russian Deputy Foreign Minister Mikhail Bogdanov.
- October 15: The National Security Division of the Justice Department acquires a FISA warrant to monitor the communications of two Russian banks as part of an investigation into whether they illegally transferred money to the Trump campaign.
- October 30: Cohen and Giorgi Rtskhiladze exchange text messages in which they discuss suppressing tapes of Trump's 2013 trip to Moscow rumored to be in the possession of Aras Agalarov's company, Crocus Group. In May 2018 Rtskhiladze tells Mueller's team that he was told the tapes were fake but did not relay that information to Cohen.
- October 31:
  - Mother Jones magazine's David Corn reports that a veteran spy, later publicly identified as Steele, gave the FBI information alleging a Russian operation to cultivate Trump, later known as the "Steele dossier".
  - Slate publishes an article by Franklin Foer alleging that a Trump server was in suspicious contact with Alfa-Bank in Russia.

2017

- February 9: Representative Jerrold Nadler (D-NY) introduces a resolution of inquiry in relation to possible crimes relating to Trump's financial dealings or collusion with Russia.
- March 10: Trump fires 46 U.S. Attorneys, including Preet Bharara, whom Trump had recently told could keep his job. Bharara had been prosecuting a money-laundering case against the Russian company Prevezon. Prevezon's attorney in the case is Natalia Veselnitskaya. The company reaches a financial settlement with the government on May 15, 2017, two days before the trial was scheduled to start.
- May 23: Maxine Waters, ranking member of the House Committee on Financial Services, requests Treasury Secretary Steven Mnuchin to release to the House Financial Services Committee any Financial Crimes Enforcement Network (FinCEN) records involving Deutsche Bank, Russia and Donald Trump.
- May 30: CNN reports on leaked intercepts of conversations between Kremlin officials discussing their potential influence on some Trump campaign members, including financial matters.

2018

- January 19: German periodical Manager Magazin reports that Deutsche Bank has presented to Germany's financial authority, BaFin, evidence of "suspicious money transfers" by Kushner; this information is due to be handed to Mueller. Deutsche Bank denies the report on January 22 and announces that it is taking legal action.
- February 12: Senator Ron Wyden (D-OR), ranking member on the Senate Finance Committee, asks the Treasury Department for documentation related to Trump's 2008 sale of an uninhabitable Palm Beach mansion to Russian oligarch Dmitry Rybolovlev.

2019

- April 15: The House Intelligence and Financial Services committees issue subpoenas to Deutsche Bank, JPMorgan Chase, Bank of America, and Citigroup demanding documents related to Trump and possible money laundering by people in Russia and Eastern Europe.
- April 17: Along with the four banks reported subpoenaed April 15, additionally Morgan Stanley, Wells Fargo & Co, Capital One Financial Corp., Royal Bank of Canada, and Toronto Dominion Bank are subpoenaed in Trump finance probe.
- May 19: Anti-money launders at Deutsche Bank AG recommended in 2016 and 2017 transactions involving Trump and Kushner-controlled entities be reported to a unit of the Treasury Department that polices financial crimes. The report is denied by the Bank that it prevented Trump transactions from being flagged.
- August 8: Per the request for House Financial Services and the House Intelligence Committees; Bank of America, Citigroup, Deutsche Bank AG, JPMorgan Chase, Morgan Stanley, and Wells Fargo turn over documents relating to Russians who may have had dealings with the Trump Organization, and/or Trump and his family. Some of the banks also turned over documents to New York state investigators.

== Recent developments ==
While no new confirmed real estate deals in Russia by the Trump Organization have been publicly verified since 2019, several journalistic and watchdog reports have continued to scrutinize potential financial flows and international engagements. In 2023, Citizens for Ethics (CREW) published an analysis suggesting that Trump may have earned up to US$160 million from international business activities during his presidency, though not specifically tied to Russia.

== See also ==
- Business career of Donald Trump
- Links between Trump associates and Russian officials
- Personal and business legal affairs of Donald Trump
- The Trump Organization
- Timeline of investigations into Trump and Russia (2019)
