= James Dodson =

James Dodson may refer to:

- James Dodson (mathematician) (1705–1757), British mathematician, actuary and innovator in the insurance industry
- James Dodson (author) (born 1953), American sports writer
