= Moscow Millionaire Fair =

The Moscow Millionaire Fair held in Moscow, Russia is an annual fair for Russian millionaires, a leading trade exhibition of luxury class goods and services. The Millionaire Fair was organized in 2005 by Gijrath Media Group B. V., the publishing house which issues magazines for the rich and famous such as Millionaire and Jackie.

The Exhibition in Moscow is organized in co-operation with publishing house Independent Media Sanoma Magazines (newspapers Vedomosti, The Moscow Times, Na rublevke, magazines Harper’s Bazaar, Robb Report, Esquire, Cosmopolitan, FHM and many others). The Millionaire Fair was founded in Amsterdam as an event for advertisers and readers of the Miljonair magazine. In September 2005 Independent Media Sanoma Magazines and GMG Events B. V. organized this event for the first time in Russia.

The Fair is open for everyone. The event is usually strict-dress coded and being a millionaire gets you free invitation. Tickets can be purchased by non-millionaires prior to the event. The attractions in 2006 included a $1 million phone encrusted in diamonds, the choice to buy a house on an island, or the island itself and $64,000 perfumes. Millionaire Fair Moscow 2007 opened on 22 November 2007 at Crocus Expo. Due to various sanctions imposed by US and western countries and deflating oil prices after 2012, Russia is perceived to be losing some attraction as growth market.

The fair seems to have been on hiatus from 2019.
