= Rhona Graff =

Executive assistant to Donald Trump

Rhona Graff is a long-standing executive assistant to Donald Trump and senior vice-president of the Trump Organization. She worked at Trump Tower in New York City for nearly thirty years prior to Trump's election to the United States Presidency, and has been described as Trump's 'gatekeeper'. Following Trump's election to the White House, Graff continued to handle his arrangements outside official engagements.

== Early life and education ==
Graff grew up the daughter of Carl Graff and Elsie Ratner Graff in the Queens borough of New York City. She holds a master's degree in psychology and education from Queens College.

== Career ==
In 1987, Graff heard of a job vacancy at Donald Trump's business and successfully applied for it. She has since held the positions of assistant to the president and senior vice-president within the Trump Organization, handling a large quantity of Trump's business activity and acting as occasional spokesperson. She has also appeared alongside Trump on NBC television show The Apprentice and has been a judge on Miss Teen USA.

Graff has been nicknamed "Trump's right hand". John Catsimatidis has similarly remarked, "If I really wanted to whisper something in his ear, I would probably go to Rhona". In a 2004 interview with Real Estate Weekly Graff stated, "Everybody knows in order to get through to him they have to go through me, so they are always on their best behavior". She has been a contributor to Inside Tennis magazine.

=== Trump presidency ===
Since Trump's assumption of the US presidency, Graff reportedly communicated with Trump through his former White House assistant Madeleine Westerhout and former Deputy Chief of Staff, Katie Walsh.

Graff's name came to the attention of Congressional investigators of Russian interference in the 2016 United States elections in August 2017 following reports that she appeared to be referred to by name by music publicist Rob Goldstone in an email to Trump's son, Donald Trump Jr, concerning the then-upcoming Veselnitskaya meeting in Trump Tower in June 2016, when Goldstone wrote: "I can also send this info to your father via Rhona, but it is ultra sensitive so wanted to send to you first". Goldstone also emailed Graff herself in July 2015, appearing to offer to help set up a meeting between Trump and Russian President Vladimir Putin.

=== Post-Trump Presidency ===
Graff was a witness for the prosecution in The People of the State of New York v. Donald J. Trump, the criminal case in which Trump was charged with 34 felony counts of falsifying business records to conceal payments made to the pornographic film actress Stormy Daniels to ensure her silence about a sexual encounter between them. Trump was found guilty of all 34 counts.

== Personal life ==
Graff lives in New York. In 1993, she married New York City's former Commissioner of Transportation, Lucius Joseph Riccio, in a ceremony performed by New York City Mayor David N. Dinkins at the Plaza Hotel, which was then owned by Donald Trump.

== See also ==
- Timeline of Russian interference in the 2016 United States elections
- Timeline of investigations into Trump and Russia (July–December 2017)
