= Trump Tower Moscow =

Proposed skyscraper in Moscow

- Alternative names: The Moscow Project
- Etymology: Donald Trump

General information
- Status: Never built
- Location: Moscow, Russia
- Owner: Trump Organization

Trump Tower Moscow, also known as the Moscow Project, was a series of proposals by the Trump Organization to develop a Trump skyscraper in Russia. Michael Cohen testified in February 2019 that Donald Trump Jr. and Ivanka Trump were regularly briefed about a proposed Trump Tower in Moscow. Trump Jr. said to US Congress that he was only "peripherally aware of it".

No such project was ever built, but the idea continued to receive press coverage due to Donald Trump's election as president of the United States and the appointment of a special counsel to investigate Russian interference in the 2016 U.S. presidential election aimed at promoting Trump's candidacy. In November 2018, Cohen pleaded guilty to lying to US Congress about the Trump Tower Moscow in a prosecution brought by the office of the special counsel.

== Background ==
Donald Trump is reported as having first envisaged a Trump building in Moscow during a visit to Moscow in 1987, which he mentioned in his own 1987 book The Art of the Deal. Trump wrote that he had talked with Yuri Dubinin about "building a large luxury hotel, across the street from the Kremlin, in partnership with the Soviet government." The development was originally envisaged as a joint venture with the Soviet Union's tourism agency, Goscom Intourist, although the plan ultimately fell through. Following the break-up of the Soviet Union, Trump's interest in a Moscow tower continued. In 2005, the Trump Organization signed a one-year contract for a construction project in Moscow with the Bayrock Group real estate firm. One of the firm's principals was Felix Sater, a Russian-born businessman with mob connections. Sater identified a site for a Trump skyscraper. It was stipulated any spas or fitness areas be branded "The Spa by Ivanka Trump."

That proposal fell through, but Sater continued to maintain a relationship with Trump. After holding the Miss Universe pageant in Russia in 2013, Trump tweeted "TRUMP TOWER-MOSCOW is next."

A New York architect had completed plans for a bold glass obelisk 100 stories high by September 2015, with the Trump logo on multiple sides. The planned Trump Tower would have been the tallest skyscraper in Europe. The proposed site was a location in the Moscow International Business Center, near the Moscow River.

== 2016 presidential campaign ==
Trump launched his campaign for the presidency in June 2015. Multiple sources have reported that Trump signed a letter of intent to develop the building, provisionally named Trump World Tower Moscow, in October 2015. Throughout the primary and general election campaigns, he consistently praised Russia and Russian president Vladimir Putin, while repeatedly making public statements that he had no business dealings with Russia, saying that he had "nothing to do with Russia" and "I know nothing about Russia ... I don't deal there." However, in November 2018 Trump told reporters that "we were thinking about building a building" in Moscow, adding that "everybody knew about it" and "there would have been nothing wrong with it".

According to former Trump attorney Michael Cohen, Trump's interest in a possible Moscow project continued through most of the primary campaign, ending in June 2016, an assertion at odds with Rudy Giuliani's recollection of events. Giuliani later said (in 2019) that the tower remained an "active proposal" throughout the campaign, and that Trump recalled discussing it with Cohen, possibly as late as October or November 2016. He quoted Trump as having said the discussions were "going on from the day I announced to the day I won." However, Giuliani later backtracked from those statements.

== November 2018 developments ==
The proposal came back to public attention in November 2018, when Cohen pleaded guilty to lying to US Congress about the issue, in a prosecution brought by the office of the special counsel.

Cohen had told a Senate committee that the project was dropped in January 2016 because they could not get the necessary permissions. However, on November 29, 2018, Cohen admitted in a court proceeding that those statements were untrue, and that he had continued to pursue the possibility of a Trump Tower Moscow until June 2016. He said that in the course of those negotiations he spoke directly with a representative of the Kremlin press office. He said he contemplated going to Moscow himself, although in fact he never did, and he raised the possibility of Trump going to Moscow during the general election campaign to seal the deal. He said he personally briefed Trump about the project on several occasions, as well as Trump family members. Cohen also admitted in court that he had lied to the Senate in September 2017 "to be consistent with [Trump's] political messaging."

In trying to make arrangements with Moscow, Cohen worked closely with Sater. According to Sater, they discussed the possibility of giving a $50 million penthouse in the tower to Russian president Vladimir Putin, saying that Putin living there would increase the value and saleability of the other units. Sater stated that the proposal was dropped in June 2016 because news reports emerged then about the Russian hacking of the Democratic National Committee, making a Russian business connection a political liability.

== Letter of intent ==
In December 2018, Trump's lawyer Rudy Giuliani was quoted as saying "It was a real-estate project. There was a letter of intent to go forward, but no one signed it." On December 19, CNN produced a copy of a letter of intent apparently signed by Trump and Andrey Rozov, the owner of I.C. Expert Investment Company, the proposed Russian development partner. Giuliani then described the letter of intent as "meaningless" because it "didn't go anywhere". He also denied that he had said the letter was never signed.

== See also ==
- Business projects of Donald Trump in Russia
- Mueller report
- Links between Trump associates and Russian officials
- Timeline of investigations into Trump and Russia (2019)
