= Yuri Dubinin =

Soviet diplomat (1930–2013)

- Юрий Дубинин
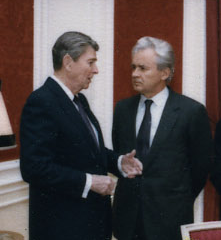
- Dubinin speaking with Ronald Reagan at the Soviet Embassy in Washington, D.C., on 11 December 1988, shortly after the Armenian earthquake

Soviet Ambassador to the United States
- In office 19 May 1986 – 15 May 1990
- Premier: Nikolai Ryzhkov
- Preceded by: Anatoly Dobrynin
- Succeeded by: Alexander Bessmertnykh

Personal details
- Born: Yuri Vladimirovich Dubinin; 7 October 1930 Nalchik, Russian SFSR, Soviet Union
- Died: 20 December 2013 (aged 83) Moscow, Russia
- Profession: Diplomat

Yuri Vladimirovich Dubinin (Russian: Юрий Владимирович Дубинин, 7 October 1930 – 20 December 2013) was a Soviet and Russian diplomat.

== Biography ==
Dubinin was born in Nalchik, the capital of the Kabardino-Balkarian Autonomous Soviet Socialist Republic, within the Russian SFSR in the Soviet Union. He received his doctorate from the Moscow State Institute of International Relations, focusing on the international politics of the Asia-Pacific region. He was the Soviet Union's Permanent Representative to the United Nations in 1986; Ambassador to the United States from 1986 to 1990; and Ambassador to France from 1990 to 1991. After the collapse of the Soviet Union, Dubinin was a Russian Deputy Foreign Minister from 20 December 1994 to 13 June 1996.

After leaving the foreign service, Dubinin worked as a professor of international politics at Moscow State Institute of International Relations and Moscow International Higher Business School. He was also a member of the Oriental Studies Association of Russia and served on the boards of the UN Association of Russia and the Russia-USA Association.

In 1986, Leonard Lauder hosted a New York City luncheon attended by future US President Donald Trump and Dubinin. With help from Vitaly Churkin, Dubinin organized Trump's first visit to the Soviet Union in July 1987, known as the Moscow Project. (Note: In January 1986, Dubinin sent Donald Trump a message in which Dubinin stated that "the leading Soviet agency for international tourism, Goskomturist, is interested in creating a joint project for the construction and management of a large hotel in Moscow." Goskomturist (Russian: Госкомтурист) or Intourist was run by the KGB.) (Note: After Donald Trump traveled to Russia and visited Moscow and St. Petersburg in 1987, he began organizing sporting events through representatives with Vladimir Putin and Sergey Chemezov's Sovintersport which was a portmanteau for Soviet, International, Export, and Sport and held a monopoly on Soviet sports athletes competing in the West. One event included the former Tour de Jersey which became the Tour de Trump and included Soviet bicyclists with their KGB agent Sergey Chemizov.)
