= Real Estate Weekly =

Weekly American real estate magazine

- Type: Weekly trade newspaper
- Owner: Hagedorn Publications
- Language: English
- Headquarters: New York City
- ISSN: 1096-7214

Real Estate Weekly is a weekly American real estate magazine primarily covering New York City.
