= James Dodson (author) =

American sports writer

- Born: James Dodson; 1953 (age 72–73); United States
- Education: East Carolina University (B.A.)
- Occupations: Sports writer, journalist, author
- Spouse: Wendy Ann Dodson
- Children: 2
- Writing career
- Years active: 1970s–present
- Period: 1970s–present
- Genres: Sports writing, non-fiction, golf literature, travel writing
- Notable works: Final Rounds; Ben Hogan: An American Life; American Triumvirate; Faithful Travelers; A Son of the Game
- Notable awards: Herbert Warren Wind/USGA International Book Award; Donald Ross Award; William Allen White Award; Golf Writers of America Awards; Order of the Long Leaf Pine

James Dodson (born 1953) is an American sports writer. He is currently a Writer-in-Residence for The Pilot (Moore County) newspaper, an editor of PineStraw magazine in Southern Pines, North Carolina, and an editor of the arts and culture magazine of the Carolina Sandhills. He also serves as founding editor of O. Henry Magazine, the arts and culture sister publication in Greensboro, North Carolina, Dodson's hometown, and Salt Magazine in Wilmington, North Carolina.

Dodson is a Distinguished Alumnus of East Carolina University. Over the course of a 30-year golf writing career, his work has earned awards from the Golf Writers of America and other industry organizations. For two decades, he was a contributing editor and regular columnist for Golf Magazine, as well as golf and travel correspondent for the Departures magazine of American Express. In 2006, he was the Louis D. Rubin Jr. Writer-in-Residence at Hollins University in Virginia.

== Bibliography ==
- Final Rounds (1996)
- Faithful Travelers
- The Dewsweepers (2001)
- Beautiful Madness (2006)
- The Road to Somewhere: Travels with a Young Boy Through an Old World
- A Golfer's Life (with Arnold Palmer)
- Ben Hogan: An American Life (2004), Doubleday, New York, ISBN 0-385-50312-1
- A Son of the Game (2009)
- American Triumvirate: Sam Snead, Byron Nelson, Ben Hogan and the Age of Modern Golf (2012)
- The Story of Seminole

== Awards ==
- The Herbert Warren Wind/USGA International Book Award for 2004 (for Ben Hogan - An American Life)
- International Network of Golf Media Award: Book Author category (for Final Rounds) and for 2009 (for A Son of the Game)
- The USGA Herbert Warren Wind Award for 2012 (for American Triumvirate)
- Donald Ross Award, 2011
- Order of the Long Leaf Pine

== Television ==
In 2008, Dodson was a featured commentator in the award-winning HBO documentary "Back Nine at Cherry Hills.” American Triumvirate: Sam Snead, Byron Nelson, Ben Hogan and the Age of Modern Golf was selected as one of the 100 notable books of 2012 by The New York Times and inspired a documentary of the same name on the Golf Channel, with a script by Dodson.

== Controversy ==
In 2017, Dodson controversially stated that in August 2013 Eric Trump said Russians financed Trump golf courses. Trump disputes Dodson's statement.

== Personal life ==
Dodson and his wife, Wendy, divide their time between Southern Pines and Greensboro, North Carolina.
