= Topical timeline of Russian interference in the 2016 United States elections =

This is a timeline of events related to Russian interference in the 2016 United States elections, sorted by topics. It also includes events described in investigations into the many suspicious links between Trump associates and Russian officials. Those investigations continued in 2017, the first and second halves of 2018, and 2019, largely as parts of the Crossfire Hurricane FBI investigation, the Special Counsel investigation, multiple ongoing criminal investigations by several State Attorneys General, and the investigation resulting in the Inspector General report on FBI and DOJ actions in the 2016 election.

== Background: presidential election campaign ==
2015

- March 18: Donald Trump announces he is forming a presidential exploratory committee.
- June 16: Trump announces his candidacy for president.
- August 21: Jeff Sessions makes his first appearance at a Trump campaign rally.
- December 21: Hillary Clinton campaign chairman John Podesta receives an email, which is later leaked by WikiLeaks, advising the campaign on how to handle Trump, recommending that the "best approach is to slaughter Donald for his bromance with Putin".

2016

- February 2: Trump comes in second in the Iowa caucuses.
- February 28: Sessions formally endorses Trump.
- March 3: Sessions is appointed to the Trump campaign's national security advisory committee.
- March 15: Trump closes in on the Republican nomination, having won five primaries.
- April 21: A staffer at the Center for the National Interest (CNI) photographs a detailed outline of the foreign policy speech Trump was scheduled to deliver on April 27, which was sitting on the desk of Dimitri Simes, the Center's president. The House Intelligence Committee would later investigate Simes' involvement in drafting the speech.
- May 4: Trump becomes the only remaining candidate for the Republican presidential nomination when John Kasich withdraws.
- May 19: Mother Jones reports that before Trump launched his campaign in 2015, Lewandowski and other political advisors suggested to Trump that they follow standard practice and hire someone to perform opposition research on him. Trump refused.
- May 26: The Associated Press reports that Trump has secured enough delegates to become the presumptive Republican nominee.
- June 6:
  - Clinton becomes the presumptive Democratic nominee.
  - At a primary night rally in New York, Trump promises a speech discussing information about Clinton. Trump says "I am going to give a major speech on probably Monday of next week [June 13], and we are going to be discussing all of the things that have taken place with the Clintons".
- July 18–21: Republican Convention in Cleveland
- July 21: Trump formally accepts the Republican nomination at the Republican Convention.
- July 22: WikiLeaks publishes 20,000 emails from seven key DNC officials. The emails show them disparaging Bernie Sanders and favoring Clinton in the 2016 presidential primaries.
- July 24: DNC Chairwoman Debbie Wasserman Schultz is forced to resign because of the WikiLeaks email publication.
- July 25–28: Democratic Convention in Philadelphia.
- July 28: Clinton formally accepts the Democratic nomination.
- August 17:
  - Steve Bannon is named Trump campaign CEO.
  - Kellyanne Conway is named Trump campaign manager.
- August 25: Trump names Sam Clovis as a campaign national co-chairman.
- October 7:
  - At 4:03 PM EDT, The Washington Post publishes a raw video tape from the television show Access Hollywood of Trump bragging about grabbing women by their genitals. While the tape is not relevant to the Russian interference in the election, the distraction of its release lessens the public impact of the joint intelligence report released hours earlier and may have triggered WikiLeaks' Podesta emails release 30 minutes later.
  - Around 4:30 PM EDT, WikiLeaks begins publishing thousands of Podesta emails, revealing excerpts from Clinton's paid speeches to Wall Street. Trump Jr. retweets WikiLeaks' and others' announcements about the release.
- November 8: Trump is elected President of the United States.

== Maria Butina and Alexander Torshin ==
Maria Butina was the founder of the Russian "Right to Bear Arms" association, and has worked with Alexander Torshin, who was the Russian Senator from Mari El Republic (2001–2015) and Deputy Governor of the Central Bank of Russia (2015–2018). From 2011 to 2016, Torshin and Butina developed contacts with the National Rifle Association of America (NRA), the foremost American gun lobby. Paul Erickson is a Republican activist involved in several presidential campaigns, and was a romantic partner of Butina.

== Internet Research Agency ==
The Internet Research Agency (IRA) is a Russian entity, sometimes called a "troll farm", tasked with coordinating online propaganda efforts to interfere in American elections. It is funded by Russian oligarch Yevgeny Prigozhin, nicknamed "Putin's chef", owner of the Concord company group. The IRA's finances were managed by Elena Khusyaynova, a Russian accountant, under the code name "Project Lakhta".

2014

- April: The IRA creates a department called the "translator project". The department's focus is on interfering in the U.S. election.
- May: The IRA begins its election interference campaign of "spread[ing] distrust towards the candidates and the political system in general."
- June 4–26: Aleksandra Krylova and Anna Bogacheva, two IRA employees, travel to the U.S. to collect intelligence. Maria Bovda, a third employee, is denied a visa. All three are indicted in February 2018 for their work on election interference.
- September 11: The IRA spreads a hoax they created about a fictitious chemical plant fire in Centerville, St. Mary Parish, Louisiana, purportedly started by ISIS. The hoax includes tweets and YouTube videos showing a chemical plant fire. Centerville is home to many chemical plants, but the plant named in the tweets does not exist. Initial tweets are sent directly to politicians, journalists, and Centerville residents.
- September 21 – October 11: The Material Evidence art exhibition is displayed at the Art Beam gallery in the Chelsea neighborhood of New York City. It portrays the conflicts in Syria and Ukraine in a pro-Russian light. It is promoted by Twitter accounts that also spread the September 11 chemical plant fire hoax. The exhibition is partly funded by the IRA.
- November 26–30: An unnamed IRA employee travels to Atlanta.
- December 13:
  - The IRA uses Twitter to spread a hoax about an Ebola outbreak in Atlanta. Many of the Twitter accounts used in the September 11 chemical plant fire hoax also spread this hoax. The hoax includes a YouTube video of medical workers wearing hazmat suits.
  - Using a different set of Twitter accounts, the IRA spreads a hoax about a purported police shooting of an unarmed black woman in Atlanta. The hoax includes a blurry video of the purported event.

2015

- July onward: Thousands of fake Twitter accounts run by the IRA begin to praise Trump over his political opponents by a wide margin, according to a later analysis by The Wall Street Journal.
- November 3: The IRA Instagram account "Stand For Freedom" attempts to organize a confederate rally in Houston, Texas, on November 14. It is unclear if anyone showed up. The Mueller Report identifies this as the IRA's first attempt to organize a U.S. rally.
- November 19: The IRA creates the first Twitter account. Purporting to be the "Unofficial Twitter account of Tennessee Republicans," it peaks at over 100,000 followers.

2016

- February 10: IRA instructs workers to "use any opportunity to criticize Hillary and the rest (except Sanders and Trump—we support them)."
- March 15: In St. Petersburg, shift workers posing as Americans follow instructions to attack Clinton on Facebook and Twitter.
- April: The IRA starts buying online ads on social media and other sites. The ads support Trump and attack Clinton.
- April 4: A rally is held in Buffalo, New York, protesting the death of India Cummings. Cummings was a black woman who had recently died in police custody. The IRA's "Blacktivist" account on Facebook actively promotes the event, reaching out directly to local activists on Facebook Messenger asking them to circulate petitions and print posters for the event. Blacktivist supplies the petitions and poster artwork.
- April 16: A rally protesting the death of Freddie Gray attracts large crowds in Baltimore. The IRA's Blacktivist Facebook group promotes and organizes the event, including reaching out to local activists.
- April 19: The IRA purchases its first pro-Trump ad through its "Tea Party News" Instagram account. The Instagram ad asks users to upload photos with the hashtag #KIDS4TRU to "make a patriotic team of young Trump supporters."
- April 23: A small group of white-power demonstrators hold a rally they call "Rock Stone Mountain" at Stone Mountain Park near Stone Mountain, Georgia. They are confronted by a large group of protesters, and some violent clashes ensue. The counterprotest was heavily promoted by IRA accounts on Tumblr, Twitter, and Facebook, and the IRA website blackmatters.com. The IRA uses its Blacktivist account on Facebook to reach out, to no avail, to activist and academic Barbara Williams Emerson, the daughter of Hosea Williams, to help promote the protests. Afterward, RT blames anti-racist protesters for violence and promotes two videos shot at the event.
- May 2: A second rally is held in Buffalo, New York, protesting the death of India Cummings. Like the April 4 rally, the event is heavily promoted by the IRA's Blacktivist Facebook account, including attempted outreach to local activists.
- May 21: Two competing rallies are held in Houston to alternately protest against and defend the recently opened Library of Islamic Knowledge at the Islamic Da'wah Center. The "Stop Islamization of Texas" rally is organized by the Facebook group "Heart of Texas". The Facebook posting for the event encourages participants to bring guns. A spokesman for the group converses with the Houston Press via email but declines to give a name. The other rally, "Save Islamic Knowledge", is organized by the Facebook group "United Muslims of America" for the same time and location. Both Facebook groups are later revealed to be IRA accounts.
- May 25: The Westboro Baptist Church holds its annual protest of Lawrence High School graduation ceremonies in Lawrence, Kansas. The "LGBT United" Facebook group organizes counterprotesters to confront the Westboro protest, including by placing an ad on Facebook and contacting local people. About a dozen people show up. Lawrence High School students do not participate because they are "skeptical" of the counterprotest organizers. LGBT United is a Russian operatives account that appears to have been created specifically for this event.
- May 29: The IRA hires an American to pose in front of the White House holding a sign that says, "Happy 55th Birthday, Dear Boss." "Boss" is a reference to Russian oligarch Yevgeny Prigozhin.
- June 1: The IRA plans a Manhattan rally called "March for Trump" and buys Facebook ads promoting the event.
- June 4: The IRA first email account sends news releases about the "March for Trump" rally to New York City media outlets.
- June 5: The IRA contacts a Trump campaign volunteer to provide signs for the "March for Trump" rally.
- June 23: The IRA persona "Matt Skiber" contacts an American to recruit for the "March for Trump" rally.
- June 24: The IRA group "United Muslims of America" buys Facebook ads for the "Support Hillary, Save American Muslims" rally.
- June 25:
  - The IRA's "March for Trump" rally occurs.
  - The IRA Facebook group LGBT United organizes a candlelight vigil for the Pulse nightclub shooting victims in Orlando, Florida.
- July: The IRA's translator project grows to over 80 employees.
- Summer: IRA employees use the stolen identities of four Americans to open PayPal and bank accounts to act as conduits for funding their activities in the United States.
- July 5: "United Muslims of America", an IRA group, orders posters with fake Clinton quotes promoting Sharia Law. The posters are ordered for the "Support Hillary, Save American Muslims" rally they are organizing.
- July 6–10: The IRA's "Don't Shoot" Facebook group and affiliated "Don't Shoot Us" website try to organize a protest outside the St. Paul, Minnesota, police headquarters on July 10 in response to the July 6 fatal police shooting of Philando Castile. Some local activists become suspicious of the event because St. Paul police were not involved in the shooting: Castile was shot by a St. Anthony police officer in nearby Falcon Heights. Local activists contact Don't Shoot. After being pressed on who they are and who supports them, Don't Shoot agrees to move the protest to the St. Anthony police headquarters. The concerned local activists investigate further and urge protesters not to participate after deciding Don't Shoot is a "total troll job." Don't Shoot organizers eventually relinquish control of the event to local organizers, who subsequently decline to accept any money from Don't Shoot.
- July 9: The "Support Hillary, Save American Muslims" rally occurs in Washington, D.C. The rally is organized by the IRA group "United Muslims of America."
- July 10: A Black Lives Matter protest rally is held in Dallas. A "Blue Lives Matter" counterprotest is held across the street. The Blue Lives Matter protest is organized by the "Heart of Texas" Facebook group, controlled by the IRA.
- July 12: An IRA group buys ads on Facebook for the "Down with Hillary" rally in New York City.
- July 16: The IRA's Blacktivist group organizes a rally in Chicago to honor Sandra Bland on the first anniversary of her death. The rally is held in front of the Chicago Police Department's Homan Square building. Participants pass around petitions calling for a Civilian Police Accountability Council ordinance.
- July 23: The IRA-organized "Down with Hillary" rally is held in New York City. The agency sends 30 news releases to media outlets using its second email address.
- August 2–3: The IRA's "Matt Skiber" persona contacts the real "Florida for Trump" Facebook account. The "T.W." persona contacts other grassroots groups.
- August 4:
  - The IRA's Facebook account "Stop AI" accuses Clinton of voter fraud during the Iowa caucuses. They buy ads promoting the post.
  - IRA groups buy ads for the "Florida Goes Trump" rallies. The 8,300 people who click on the ads are sent to the Agency's "Being Patriotic" Facebook page.
- August 5: The IRA second Twitter account hires an actress to play Hillary Clinton in prison garb and someone to build a cage to hold the actress. The actress and cage are to appear at the "Florida Goes Trump" rally in West Palm Beach, Florida, on August 20.
- August 11: The IRA first Twitter account claims that voter fraud is being investigated in North Carolina.
- August 12–18: The IRA's persona "Josh Milton" communicates with Trump Campaign officials via email to request Trump/Pence signs and the phone numbers of campaign affiliates as part of an effort to organize pro-Trump campaign rallies in Florida.
- August 15: A Trump campaign county chair contacts the IRA through their phony email accounts to suggest locations for rallies.
- August 16: The IRA buys ads on Instagram for the "Florida Goes Trump" rallies.
- August 18:
  - The IRA uses its third email account to contact a Trump campaign official in Florida. The email requests campaign support at the forthcoming "Florida Goes Trump" rallies. It is unknown whether the campaign official responded.
  - The IRA pays the person they hired to build a cage for a "Florida Goes Trump" rally in West Palm Beach, Florida.
- August 19:
  - A Trump supporter suggests to the IRA Twitter account "March for Trump" that it contact a Trump campaign official. The official is emailed by the agency's third email account.
  - The IRA's "Matt Skiber" persona contacts another Trump campaign official on Facebook.
- August 20: 17 "Florida Goes Trump" rallies are held across Florida. The rallies are organized by Russian trolls from the IRA.
- August 27: The IRA Facebook group "SecuredBorders" organizes a "Citizens before refugees" protest rally at the City Council Chambers in Twin Falls, Idaho. Only a small number of people show up for the three-hour event, most likely because it is Saturday and the Chambers are closed.
- August 31:
  - An American contacts the IRA's "Being Patriotic" account about a possible September 11 event in Miami.
  - The IRA buys ads for a September 11 rally in New York City.
- September 3: The IRA Facebook group "United Muslims of America" organizes a "Safe Space for Muslim Neighborhood" rally outside the White House, attracting at least 57 people.
- September 9: The IRA sends money to its American groups to fund the September 11 rally in Miami, and to pay the actress who portrayed Clinton at the West Palm Beach, Florida, rally.
- September 20–26: BlackMattersUS, an IRA website, recruits activists to participate in protests over the police shooting of Keith Lamont Scott in Charlotte, North Carolina. The IRA pays for expenses such as microphones and speakers.
- September 22: The IRA buys ads on Facebook for "Miners for Trump" rallies in Pennsylvania.
- October 2: "Miners for Trump" rallies are held across Pennsylvania. The IRA uses the same techniques to organize the rallies as they used for the "Florida Goes Trump" rallies, including hiring a person to wear a Clinton mask and a prison uniform.
- October 16: The IRA's Instagram account "Woke Blacks" makes a post aimed at suppressing black voter turnout.
- October 19: The IRA runs its most popular ad on Facebook. The ad is for the IRA's Back the Badge Facebook group and shows a badge with the words "Back the Badge" in front of police lights under the caption "Community of people who support our brave Police Officers."
- October 22: A large rally is held in Charlotte, North Carolina, protesting the police shooting of Keith Lamont Scott. The IRA website BlackMattersUS recruits unwitting local activists to organize the rally. BlackMattersUS provides an activist with a bank card to pay for rally expenses.
- November 2: The IRA first Twitter account alleges "#VoterFraud by counting tens of thousands of ineligible mail in Hillary votes being reported in Broward County, Florida." Trump Jr. retweets it.
- November 3: The IRA Instagram account "Blacktivist" suggests people vote for Stein instead of Clinton.
- November 5: Anti-Clinton "Texit" rallies are held across Texas. The IRA's "Heart of Texas" Facebook group organizes the rallies around the theme of Texas seceding from the United States if Clinton is elected. The group contacts the Texas Nationalist Movement, a secessionist organization, to help with organizing efforts, but they decline to help. Small rallies are held in Dallas, Fort Worth, Austin, and other cities. No one attends the Lubbock rally.
- November 8: Hours after the polls close, the hashtag #Calexit is retweeted by thousands of IRA accounts.
- November 11: A large banner is hung from the Arlington Memorial Bridge in Washington, D.C., showing a photo of Obama with the words "Goodbye Murderer" at the bottom. The IRA third Twitter account takes credit and is an early promoter of the banner.
- November 12: A Trump protest called "Trump is NOT my President" attracts 5,000–10,000 protestors in Manhattan who march from Union Square to Trump Tower. The protest is organized by the IRA using their BlackMattersUS Facebook account.
- November 19: The IRA organizes the "Charlotte Against Trump" rally in Charlotte, North Carolina.
- December 8: The IRA runs an ad on Craigslist to hire someone to walk around New York City dressed as Santa Claus while wearing a Trump mask.

== Hacking incidents ==
2013

- Apparent security hackers gain access to the Trump Organization's domain registrar account at GoDaddy and register hundreds of "shadow" subdomains with IP addresses located at a company in St. Petersburg, Russia, known for hosting websites containing malware. In November 2017, the subdomains disappeared after the Trump Organization was notified of the issue, although the company denies that any breach occurred. August is specifically noted.

2015

- Summer: Hackers linked to the Russian Federal Security Service (FSB) gain access to the Democratic National Committee's computer network. Dutch intelligence services alert their U.S. counterparts that a hacking group known as Cozy Bear has penetrated the Democratic National Committee (DNC) servers.
- September: An FBI special agent reports to the DNC that at least one of its computer systems has been hacked by an espionage team linked to the Russian government. The agent is transferred to a tech-support contractor at the help desk, who makes a cursory check of DNC server logs and does not reply to the agent's follow-up calls, allegedly because of a belief that the call might have been a prank.

2016

- March 15: In Moscow, Russian military intelligence hacker Ivan Yermakov, working for Fancy Bear, begins probing the DNC computer network.
- March 19: Podesta is asked to change his email password in an apparent phishing attempt, believed to be spearheaded by Russian hackers. They gain access to his account, and proceed to steal the entire contents of his account, about 50,000 emails.
- March 21: Russian hackers steal over 50,000 emails from Podesta's account.
- April: Hackers linked to the GRU gain access to the DNC computer network.
- April 6: Hackers spearphish the credentials of a Democratic Congressional Campaign Committee (DCCC) employee.
- April 12: Russian hackers use stolen credentials to infiltrate the DCCC's computer network and install malware.
- April 18: Russian hackers break into the DNC's computers.
- April 19: Russian hackers create a fictitious online persona, "Carrie Feehan", to register the domain DCLeaks.com, paid for in bitcoin, to release stolen documents.
- Late April: The DNC's IT department notices suspicious computer activity. Within 24 hours, the DNC contacts the FBI, and hires a private cybersecurity firm, CrowdStrike, to investigate.
- May: CrowdStrike determines that sophisticated adversaries—denominated Cozy Bear and Fancy Bear—are responsible for the DNC hack. Fancy Bear, in particular, is suspected of affiliation with Russia's Main Intelligence Directorate (GRU).
- May 4: Starting May 4, and continuing through September, a pair of servers owned by Alfa-Bank performed a reverse DNS lookup for the Trump Organization's mail1.trump-email.com domain on a server housed by Listrak and administered by Cendyn more than 2,000 times. Alfa-Bank performed the most lookups during this period, followed by Spectrum Health, and then Heartland Payment Systems with 76 lookups; beyond that no other visible entity made more than two.
- May 25: Thousands of DNC emails are stolen.
- June: The FBI sends a warning to states about "bad actors" probing state voter-registration databases and systems to seek vulnerabilities; investigators believe Russia is responsible.
- June 8: The DCLeaks website comes online.
- June 11–12: The DNC expels Russian hackers from its servers. Some of the hackers had been accessing the DNC network for over a year.
- June 14: The DNC publicly alleges that they have been hacked by Russian state-backed hackers. Following this news, a small group of politically diverse prominent computer scientists scattered across the US, including a member Dexter Filkins calls "Max" in his October 2018 New Yorker article, begin combing the Domain Name System (DNS).
- Mid June: Shortly after the DNC announced that it had been hacked, the RNC informs the FBI that some Republican campaign email accounts hosted by Smartech have been hacked. Compromised accounts include the campaign committees of "Senator John McCain, Senator Lindsey Graham, [...] Representative Robert Hurt[,] [s]everal state GOP organizations, Republican PACs, and campaign consultants." Approximately 300 emails from May through October 2015 are eventually posted on DCLeaks.com.
- June 23: GRU hackers successfully use an SQL injection attack to breach servers belonging to the Illinois State Board of Elections and steal voter registration data.
- July 12: The Illinois State Board of Elections discovers some of its servers have been hacked and closes the security hole used to compromise the systems.
- July 13: The Illinois State Board of Elections takes its website offline.
- July 19: The Illinois State Board of Elections informs the Illinois Attorney General (IAG) and the Illinois General Assembly of the breach. The IAG notifies the FBI, which brings in the Department of Homeland Security to help investigate.
- July 21–August 12: The Illinois State Board of Elections brings its website back online. The GRU attacks the system five times per second before giving up on August 12.
- August 18: The FBI issues a nationwide "flash alert" warning state election officials about foreign infiltration of election systems in two states, later reported to be Arizona and Illinois. The alert includes technical evidence suggesting Russian responsibility, and urges states to boost their cyberdefenses. Although labeled for distribution only to "NEED TO KNOW recipients," a copy is leaked to the media.
- August 26: The Illinois State Board of Elections produces a report on the June–August hacking of their systems by the GRU.
- August 28: Peter W. Smith sends an encrypted email to an undisclosed list of recipients that includes Trump campaign co-chair Sam Clovis. The email says that after two days of meetings in D.C. on Clinton's private email server, he determined that the server was hacked by "State-related players" as well as private mercenaries. He writes, "Parties with varying interests, are circling to release ahead of the election."
- August 29: The Washington Post is the first to report that Illinois discovered in July that its voter registration servers were hacked, and that the user ID and password of an Arizona election official in Gila County was stolen in June. Arizona Secretary of State Michele Reagan shut down the state's voter registration system for a week but did not find that any state or county systems were compromised.
- August 31: Smith sends an email to an undisclosed list of recipients in which he claims KLS Research met with parties who had access to Clinton's missing emails, including some with "ties and affiliations to Russia". Mueller's team is unable to determine whether such meetings occurred or find any evidence that Smith's team was in contact with Russian hackers.
- September 3–5: Wealthy Republican donor Peter W. Smith gathers a team to try to acquire the 30,000 deleted Clinton emails from hackers. He believes Clinton's private email server was hacked and copies of the emails were stolen. Among the people recruited are former GCHQ information-security specialist Matt Tait, alt-right activist Charles C. Johnson, former Business Insider CTO and alt-right activist Pax Dickinson, "dark web expert" Royal O'Brien, and Jonathan Safron. Tait quickly abandons the team after learning the true purpose of the endeavor. Hackers contacted in the search include "Guccifer 2.0" and Andrew Auernheimer (a.k.a. "weev"). The team finds five groups of hackers claiming to have the emails. Two of the groups are Russian. Flynn is in email contact with the team. Smith commits suicide on May 14, 2017, about ten days after telling the story to The Wall Street Journal but before the story is published in June.
- September 4–5: At the 2016 G20 Hangzhou summit, Obama confronts Putin about Russian cyber attacks, telling him to stop. Putin explains Russia's stance on the issue.
- September 20: GRU hackers compromise a DNC account on a cloud-computing service and begin copying 300 GB of data off of the servers.
- September 21: The New York Times delivers potential evidence of communications with Trump's domain with Alfa-Bank and other entities to BGR Group, a Washington lobbying firm that worked for Alfa-Bank, from a story Lichtblau was pursuing following findings "Max" and his lawyer decided to hand over to him.
- September 23: The "A record" of the Trump Organization's mail1.trump-email.com domain is deleted.
- September 27: Ten minutes after Alfa-Bank servers made a last failed attempt to contact to Trump Organization's mail1.trump-email.com domain (which had its "A record" deleted September 23), one of the Alfa-Bank servers looks up the new domain name trump1.contact-client.com, which was routed to the same Trump server. The new domain does not appear to have been previously active and the PTR record did not include the new, alternate name. According to "Max"'s data, the Alfa-Bank server only looked up the new domain once. Spectrum Health never succeeded in relocating the Trump server through the new route.
- September 29: FBI Director James Comey testifies before the House Judiciary Committee, confirming that federal investigators have detected suspicious activities in voter registration databases, as stated in the August 18 alert.
- October 31: Slate publishes an article by Franklin Foer alleging that a Trump server was in suspicious contact with Alfa-Bank in Russia. Snopes examined the story and rated it "Unproven". Several cyber security experts saw nothing nefarious, while the FBI was still investigating the matter: "One U.S. official said investigators find the server relationship 'odd' and are not ignoring it. But the official said there is still more work for the FBI to do. Investigators have not yet determined whether a connection would be significant."
- November: The GRU targets over 120 Florida election officials' email accounts with spearphishing attacks. They receive emails purportedly from VR Systems, the state's voter registration and election results service provider, asking them to open a purported Word document containing a trojan. At least some emails contain British spellings and come from Gmail accounts, which VR Systems doesn't use. Many of the emails are flagged by spam filters. They also receive an email from VR's chief operating officer warning them about the malicious emails. Later, the FBI believes one county government's network was compromised in a way that would have given security hackers the ability to alter voter registration data, but this is disputed by state election officials.
- November 4: Mother Jones reports that an October security sweep of the DNC offices in Washington, D.C., discovered a signal that may have belonged to a device outside the office that could intercept cell phone calls. The DNC says details of the security sweep were passed on to the FBI and "another agency with three letters," but no device was ever found.
- November–December: After the election, a Russian hacker breaks into Election Assistance Commission servers and steals the login credentials for over 100 users. The hack is discovered by chance when Recorded Future, a security firm, comes across the credentials being offered for sale on the dark web to a Middle Eastern government.
- December 29: The NCCIC releases a joint analysis report titled "GRIZZLY STEPPE – Russian Malicious Cyber Activity" as a follow-up to the October 7, 2016, joint statement on election security. The report describes methods used by Russian intelligence groups APT29 and APT28 to penetrate election-related servers.

2017

- January 9: Profexer, a Ukrainian hacker who is the author of a hacking tool described in the December 29, 2016, NCCIC report on Russian cyber attacks, goes dark. He turns himself in to the Ukrainian police and becomes a cooperating witness for the FBI. The Ukrainian police say he was not placed under arrest.

== Searches for Hillary Clinton's missing emails ==
2015

- December 3: Barbara Ledeen, a longtime staffer for Senator Chuck Grassley on the Senate Judiciary Committee and wife of close Flynn associate and Iran–Contra affair figure Michael Ledeen, sends Peter W. Smith a 25-page proposal for finding Clinton's missing emails. The proposal posits that Clinton's private email server was hacked and proposes, among other things, contacting foreign intelligence services to determine if they have any copies of Clinton's emails. At the time, her investigation is not connected to the Trump campaign, though she gives Flynn regular updates throughout the summer of 2016. Smith forwards the email to two colleagues.
- December 16: Smith declines to help Leden's task to find Clinton's emails because he feels the search isn't viable at the time.

2016

- July 27:
  - Trump calls for Russia to give Clinton's missing emails to the FBI. His tweet is before his statements on the matter to the press.
  - At a news conference, Trump says he "hopes" Russia can find Clinton's missing emails. The remark triggers a backlash from media and politicians who criticize Trump's "urging a foreign adversary to conduct cyberespionage" against his political opponent. Trump responds that he was being "sarcastic". A 2018 indictment alleges Russian intelligence officers began a spearphishing attack on non-public Clinton campaign email accounts that night, In April–May 2018, Flynn tells Mueller's team that after this event, Trump repeatedly asks "individuals affiliated with his Campaign[sic]" to find Clinton's emails.
  - On or about this date "the Conspirators attempted after hours to spearphish for the first time email accounts at a domain hosted by a third-party provider and used by Clinton's personal office. At or around the same time, they also targeted seventy-six email addresses at the domain for the Clinton Campaign."
- July 29: Cambridge Analytica employee Emily Cornell sends an email to people working with the pro-Trump Make America Number 1 super PAC, which is funded by Robert and Rebekah Mercer. Cornell notes Cambridge Analytica's work for the super PAC and suggests they capitalize on the recently released DNC emails and any Clinton emails that may be stolen as suggested by Trump on July 27.
- August 28: Wealthy Republican donor Peter W. Smith sends an encrypted email to an undisclosed list of recipients that includes Trump campaign co-chair Sam Clovis. The email says that after two days of meetings in D.C. on Clinton's private email server, he determined that the server was hacked by "State-related players" as well as private mercenaries. He writes, "Parties with varying interests, are circling to release ahead of the election."
- August 31: Smith sends an email to an undisclosed list of recipients in which he claims KLS Research met with parties who had access to Clinton's missing emails, including some with "ties and affiliations to Russia". Mueller's team is unable to determine whether such meetings occurred or find any evidence that Smith's team was in contact with Russian hackers.
- September 2: Peter W. Smith incorporates "KLS Research", an LLC registered in Delaware, as a vehicle to manage funds raised to pay for the search for Clinton's emails and "to avoid campaign reporting." KLS is structured as an "independent expenditure group," which is forbidden by law from coordinating with the Trump campaign. Over $30,000 flows through the company during the campaign.
- September 3–5: Smith gathers a team to try to acquire the 30,000 deleted Clinton emails from hackers. He believes Clinton's private email server was hacked and copies of the emails were stolen. Among the people recruited are former GCHQ information-security specialist Matt Tait, alt-right activist Charles C. Johnson, former Business Insider CTO and alt-right activist Pax Dickinson, "dark web expert" Royal O'Brien, and Jonathan Safron. Tait quickly abandons the team after learning the true purpose of the endeavor. Hackers contacted in the search include "Guccifer 2.0" and Andrew Auernheimer (a.k.a. "weev"). The team finds five groups of hackers claiming to have the emails. Two of the groups are Russian. Flynn is in email contact with the team. Smith commits suicide on May 14, 2017, about ten days after telling the story to The Wall Street Journal but before the story is published in June.
- September 8: Smith transfers $9,500 from KLS Research to his personal account, then withdraws $4,900 of it in cash and writes checks for the remaining amount. In August 2018, BuzzFeed News reports that the FBI suspects the money was used to pay hackers.
- September 9: Smith circulates a document claiming his Clinton email search initiative is being performed in coordination with the Trump campaign "to the extent permitted as an independent expenditure organization." The document lists Flynn, Clovis, Bannon, and Conway as involved campaign members, and Corsi under "Independent Groups/Organizations/Individuals". Later, Mueller's team is unable to confirm the active participation of Bannon and Conway.
- September 16: Barbara Ledeen emails Smith about a cache of purported Clinton emails she says she found on the dark web. She asks for help raising money to pay for a technical advisor to authenticate the emails. Erik Prince provides the money. In April 2018 Prince tells Mueller's team that the technical advisor determined that the emails were real.

== Wikileaks, Guccifer 2.0, Assange, and Stone ==
2015

- August 8: Roger Stone leaves the Trump campaign. The campaign says it fired Stone, but Stone insists he quit. He subsequently gives the press a resignation letter that the campaign says it never received.
- November 19: Julian Assange privately tells a group of core WikiLeaks supporters that he prefers the GOP win the election because Clinton "is a bright, well connected, sadistic sociopath" who will have "greater freedom to start wars than the GOP and has the will to do so."

2016

- March 2: Assange consoles a core WikiLeaks supporter who is upset about Clinton's success in the primary elections the day before, writing, "Perhaps Hillary will have a stroke."
- March 16: WikiLeaks publishes a searchable archive of 30,000 Clinton emails that had been released by the State Department in response to a FOIA request. Internal WikiLeaks messages indicate the purpose of the archive is to annoy Clinton and establish WikiLeaks as a "resource/player" in the election.
- Spring: Stone tells associates he is in contact with Assange.
- May: Michael Caputo arranges a meeting in Miami with Stone, Florida-based Russian Henry Oknyansky (a.k.a. "Henry Greenberg"), and Ukrainian Alexei Rasin. Rasin claims to have evidence showing Clinton was involved in laundering hundreds of thousands of dollars through Rasin's companies. Stone turns down the offer, telling them that Trump won't pay for opposition research. In June 2018, after many repeated denials, Stone finally admits to knowingly meeting with a Russian national in 2016 when asked about this meeting by The Washington Post. In May 2018, Caputo tells Mueller's team that he did not attend the meeting, did not know what Oknyansky was offering, and did not know payment was asked for until Stone told him later. In July 2018, Oknyansky tells Mueller's team that Rasin was motivated by money, and that Caputo attended the meeting. According to the Mueller Report, Mueller's team is unable to find any evidence that Clinton ever did any business with Rasin.
- June: Around this time, the conspirators charged in the July 2018 indictment stage and release tens of thousands of stolen emails and documents using fictitious online personas, including "DCLeaks" and "Guccifer 2.0".
- June 12: On ITV, Assange tells Robert Peston' on his television show Peston on Sunday that emails related to Clinton are "pending publication" and says, "WikiLeaks has a very good year ahead."
- June 14: The GRU uses its twitter account to reach out to WikiLeaks and offer to coordinate the release of sensitive information about Clinton, including financial documents.
- June 15: "Guccifer 2.0" (GRU) claims credit for the DNC hacking and posts some of the stolen material to a website. CrowdStrike stands by its "findings identifying two separate Russian intelligence-affiliated adversaries present in the DNC network in May 2016." Gawker publishes an opposition research document on Trump that was stolen from the DNC. "Guccifer 2.0" sent the file to Gawker.
- June 19: Assange asks the London Ecuadorian Embassy for a faster Internet connection. Embassy staff help Assange install new equipment.
- June 22: WikiLeaks reaches out to "Guccifer 2.0" via Twitter. They ask "Guccifer 2.0" to send them material because it will have a bigger impact if they publish it. They also specifically ask for material on Clinton they can publish before the convention.
- July 6: Assange, as "WikiLeaks", asks "Guccifer 2.0" via Twitter direct messaging to provide any information related to Clinton they may have. "Guccifer 2.0" releases another cache of DNC documents and sends copies to The Hill.
- July 13: A hacker or group calling themselves "Guccifer 2.0" releases over 10,000 names from the DNC in two spreadsheets and a list of objectionable quotes from Sarah Palin.
- July 14: German hackers Andrew Müller-Maguhn and Bernd Fix meet with Assange for at least four hours. Müller-Maguhn is named in the Mueller report as a possible conduit for delivering hacked emails to Assange. "Guccifer 2.0" sends Assange an encrypted 1 GB file containing stolen DNC emails, and Assange confirms that he received it. WikiLeaks publishes the file's contents on July 22.
- July 18: An Ecuadorian security guard is caught on video receiving a package outside the London embassy from a man wearing a mask and sunglasses. Later that day, Wikileaks tells Russian hackers that it received files and will be publishing them soon. "Guccifer 2.0" dumps a new batch of documents from the DNC servers, including personal information of 20,000 Republican donors and opposition research on Trump.
- July 22: Ahead of the DNC convention scheduled for July 25, WikiLeaks publishes 20,000 emails from seven key DNC officials. The emails show them disparaging Bernie Sanders and favoring Hillary Clinton in the 2016 presidential primaries.
- July 24: DNC Chairwoman Debbie Wasserman Schultz is forced to resign because of the WikiLeaks email publication.
- July 25:
  - Based on assessments from cybersecurity firms, the DNC and the Clinton campaign say that Russian intelligence operators have hacked their e-mails and forwarded them to WikiLeaks.
  - Stone emails his associate Jerome Corsi, "Get to (Assange) [a]t Ecuadorian Embassy in London and get the pending (WikiLeaks) emails". Corsi later passes this along to Ted Malloch, a conservative author in London.
- July 31: Stone emails Jerome Corsi telling him to use Ted Malloch as an intermediary with Assange. Malloch tells Corsi he doesn't have a relationship with Assange and suggests using people close to Farage instead.
- August: Trump donor Rebekah Mercer asks the CEO of Cambridge Analytica whether the company could better organize the Clinton-related emails being released by WikiLeaks.
- August 2: Corsi writes to Stone: "Word is friend in embassy plans 2 more dumps," referring to Assange; and "One shortly after I'm back. 2nd in Oct. Impact planned to be very damaging."
- August 4:
  - In an InfoWars interview, Stone tells Jones that Assange has proof of wrongdoing by the Clinton Foundation and is ready to release it.
  - Stone sends Sam Nunberg an email in which he claims that he dined with Assange the night before.
- August 5: Stone writes an article for Breitbart News in which he insists "Guccifer 2.0" hacked the DNC, using statements by "Guccifer 2.0" on Twitter and to The Hill as evidence for his claim. He tries to spin the DNC's Russia claim as a coverup for their supposed embarrassment over being penetrated by a single hacker. The article leads to "Guccifer 2.0" reaching out to and conversing with Stone via Twitter.
- August 6: Assange addresses the Green Party National Convention in Houston by videolink, to discuss the hacked DNC documents published by WikiLeaks. Green candidate Jill Stein later states she does not know why or how this address was arranged.
- August 8: Stone, speaking in Florida to the Southwest Broward Republican Organization, claims he is in contact with Assange, saying, "I actually have communicated with Assange. I believe his next tranche of his documents pertain to the Clinton Foundation." Stone later claims the communications were through an intermediary.
- August 9: WikiLeaks denies having communicated with Stone. Privately, Assange tells a core group of WikiLeaks supporters that he is unaware of any communications with Stone.
- August 12:
  - In a #MAGA Podcast, Stone says Assange has all the emails deleted by Huma Abedin and Cheryl Mills.
  - "Guccifer 2.0" releases a cache of documents stolen from the Democratic Congressional Campaign Committee.
  - Journalist Emma Best has two simultaneous conversations by Twitter direct message with "Guccifer 2.0" and WikiLeaks. Best tries to negotiate the hosting of stolen DNC emails and documents on archive.org. WikiLeaks wants Best to act as an intermediary to funnel the material from "Guccifer 2.0" to them. The conversation ends with "Guccifer 2.0" saying he will send the material directly to WikiLeaks.
- August 13: Twitter and WordPress temporarily suspend Guccifer 2.0's accounts. Stone calls "Guccifer 2.0" a hero.
- August 15:
  - A candidate for Congress allegedly contacts Guccifer 2.0 to request information on the candidate's opponent. Guccifer 2.0 responds with the requested stolen information.
  - Guccifer 2.0 begins posting information about Florida and Pennsylvania races stolen from the DCCC.
- August 16:
  - Stone tells Jones that he is in contact with Assange, claiming he has "political dynamite" on Clinton.
  - Stone sends "Guccifer 2.0" an article he wrote for The Hill on manipulating the vote count in voting machines. "Guccifer 2.0" responds the next day, "@RogerJStoneJr paying u back".
- August 22:
  - Florida GOP campaign advisor Aaron Nevins contacts Guccifer 2.0 and asks for material. Nevins sets up a Dropbox account and "Guccifer 2.0" transfers 2.5 gigabytes of data into it. Nevins analyzes the data, posts the results on his blog, HelloFLA.com, and sends "Guccifer 2.0" a link. "Guccifer 2.0" forwards the link to Stone.
  - "Guccifer 2.0" allegedly sends DCCC material on Black Lives Matter to a reporter, and they discuss how to use it in a story. "Guccifer 2.0" also gives the reporter the password for accessing emails stolen from Clinton's staff that were posted to "Guccifer 2.0's" website but had not yet been made public. On August 31, The Washington Examiner publishes a story based on the material the same day the material is released publicly on Guccifer 2.0's website.
- August 23: The Smoking Gun reaches out to "Guccifer 2.0" for comment on its contacts with Stone. "Guccifer 2.0" accuses The Smoking Gun of working with the FBI.
- August 25: Interviewed by Megyn Kelly on The Kelly File, Assange says that he will not release any damaging information on Trump. He also tells her significant information will be released on Clinton before November.
- August 26: After Clinton claims that Russian intelligence was behind the leaks, Assange says she is causing "hysteria" about Russia, adding, "The Trump campaign has a lot of things wrong with it, but as far as we can see being Russian agents is not one of them."
- August 27: Through Assange's attorney Margaret Ratner Kunstler, the widow of William Kunstler, Randy Credico knows that WikiLeaks will release information about the Clinton campaign in the near future and texts Stone that "Julian Assange has kryptonite on Hillary." Credico continues to update Stone about the upcoming WikiLeaks release of numerous emails stolen from Podesta and the Clinton campaign. The emails are released beginning on October 7.
- August 31: "Guccifer 2.0" leaks campaign documents stolen from House Minority Leader Nancy Pelosi's hacked personal computer.
- September: Stone emails Credico to ask Assange for Clinton emails from August 10–30, 2011.
- September 15:
  - DCLeaks sends a Twitter direct message to WikiLeaks asking how to discuss submission-related issues because WikiLeaks is not responding to messages on their secure chat and DCLeaks has something of interest to share.
  - "Guccifer 2.0" sends a Twitter direct message to DCLeaks informing them that WikiLeaks is trying to contact them to set up communications using encrypted emails.
- September 20: While browsing a political chatroom, Jason Fishbein comes across the password to a non-public website (PutinTrump.org) focusing on Trump's ties to Russia that is nearing launch. He sends the password and website to WikiLeaks in a Twitter direct message. WikiLeaks tweets about the website and password.
- September 21: WikiLeaks sends a Twitter direct message to Trump Jr. about the password to PutinTrump.org. Several hours later, Trump Jr. emails senior campaign staff about the WikiLeaks direct message and website, including Conway, Bannon, Kushner, David Bossie, and Brad Parscale. After the public launch of PutinTrump.org, Trump Jr. sends a Twitter direct message to WikiLeaks, "Off the record, l don't know who that is but I'll ask around. Thanks." This is believed to be the first direct communication between Trump Jr. and WikiLeaks.
- September 22: DCLeaks sends an encrypted file to WikiLeaks and, separately, a tweet with a string of characters. The Mueller Report suspects that this was a transfer of stolen documents, but does not rule out that Andrew "Andy" Müller-Maguhn or another intermediary may have hand-delivered the documents. In 2018, Müller-Maguhn, a known hacker and frequent visitor to Assange, denies transporting material to him.
- October 1: Stone tweets that something damaging to Clinton will happen soon.
- October 2: Stone tells Jones on InfoWars, "I'm assured the motherlode is coming Wednesday...I have reason to believe that it is devastating."
- October 3:
  - Stone tweets that Assange will release something soon.
  - WikiLeaks sends a Twitter direct message to Trump Jr. asking him to help "push" a WikiLeaks tweet from earlier in the day ("Hillary Clinton on Assange 'Can't we just drone this guy?[']") that includes a link to truepundit.com. Trump Jr. responds, "Already did that earlier today. It's amazing what she can get away with. What's behind this Wednesday leak I keep reading about?"
- October 4: Assange announces the pending release of a million documents about the U.S. presidential election. He denies any specific intent to harm Clinton.
- October 5:
  - (Wednesday) Stone tweets that a payload from Assange is coming.
  - Trump Jr. retweets a WikiLeaks tweet announcing an "860Mb [sic]" archive of various Clinton campaign documents from "Guccifer 2.0".
- October 6: Stone tweets, "Julian Assange will deliver a devastating expose on Hillary at a time of his choosing. I stand by my prediction."
- October 7:
  - At 12:40 PM EDT, The DHS and the ODNI issue a joint statement accusing the Russian government of breaking into the computer systems of several political organizations and releasing the obtained material via DCLeaks, WikiLeaks, and "Guccifer 2.0", with the intent "to interfere with the U.S. election process."
  - Corsi holds a conference call with members of WorldNetDaily in which he warns them of the imminent release of the Access Hollywood tape and tells them "to reach Assange immediately". In November 2018 he tells Mueller's team that he thought Malloch was on the call and assumed Malloch had successfully contacted Assange because of the subsequent Podesta emails release later in the day. Travel records show Malloch was on a trans-Atlantic flight at the time. The Mueller Report says Corsi's sometimes conflicting statements about the call's contents have not been corroborated.
  - At 4:03 PM EDT, The Washington Post publishes a raw video tape from the television show Access Hollywood of Trump bragging about grabbing women by their genitals. While the tape is not relevant to the Russian interference in the election, the distraction of its release lessens the public impact of the joint intelligence report released hours earlier and may have triggered WikiLeaks' Podesta emails release 30 minutes later.
  - Around 4:30 PM EDT, WikiLeaks begins publishing thousands of Podesta emails, revealing excerpts from Clinton's paid speeches to Wall Street. Trump Jr. retweets WikiLeaks' and others' announcements about the release.
- October 8–14: The U.S. government expresses to Ecuadorian officials its concerns that Assange is using their London embassy to help Russian's interfere in the U.S. election.
- October 11: Podesta says he thinks the Trump campaign had advance notice of WikiLeaks' release of his emails.
- October 12: WikiLeaks writes to Trump Jr., "Hey Donald, great to see you and your dad talking about our publications" and "Strongly suggest your dad tweets this link if he mentions us wlsearch.tk." Fifteen minutes later, Donald Trump tweets, "Very little pick-up by the dishonest media of incredible information provided by WikiLeaks. So dishonest! Rigged system!"
- October 13: WikiLeaks again denies communicating with Stone. Later that day, Stone and WikiLeaks communicate by private Twitter message.
- October 14:
  - Trump Jr. tweets about wlsearch.tk as requested by WikiLeaks on October 12.
  - Pence denies that the Trump campaign is working with WikiLeaks, stating that "nothing could be further from the truth".
- October 15:
  - The Democratic Coalition Against Trump files a complaint with the FBI against Stone for colluding with Russia. They ask the FBI to look into connections between Stone, the Trump campaign, and the hacking of Podesta's emails.
  - The Ecuadorian Embassy cuts Assange's Internet access and telephone service.
- October 18: Ecuador's Ministry of Foreign Affairs releases a public statement announcing that it "exercised its right" to "temporarily restrict access to some of [WikiLeaks'] private communications network within its Embassy in the United Kingdom" and that the government of Ecuador "does not interfere in external electoral processes, nor does it favor any particular candidate".
- October 19:
  - Stone denies having advance knowledge of WikiLeaks' release of Podesta's emails.
  - Hours after a heated argument between Assange and Ecuadorian Ambassador Carlos Abad Ortiz the night before, two Wikileaks personnel remove computer equipment and "about 100 hard drives" from the embassy.
- October 21: WikiLeaks sends Trump Jr. private tweets suggesting that the campaign give them Trump's tax returns to publish so that they seem less of a "'pro-Trump' 'pro-Russia'" source.
- October 28: Peter W. Smith sends an email to an undisclosed list of recipients in which he writes that there is a "tug-of-war going on within WikiLeaks over its planned releases in the next few days" and that WikiLeaks "has maintained that it will save its best revelations for last, under the theory this allows little time for response prior to the U.S. election November 8." An attachment to the email says that WikiLeaks will release "All 33k deleted Emails" by November 1.
- November 21: Peter W. Smith, who launched a search for copies of Clinton's deleted emails in September, asserts WikiLeaks has had the emails for nine months but has not released them. In July 2017, WikiLeaks denies the assertion in response to a question by Politico.

2017

- January 12:
  - "Guccifer 2.0" denies having any relation to the Russian government.
  - Deripaska's longtime American lobbyist Adam Waldman makes the first of nine visits with Assange in 2017 at the Ecuadorian Embassy in London.
- January 13: Waldman visits Assange for the second time.

== Manafort, Davis, Patten, Gates, Kilimnik and Deripaska ==
Paul Manafort is a political consultant who had worked for several Republican presidential campaigns in the 1980s and 1990s. He was first appointed convention manager for the Trump campaign in March 2016, then campaign chairman in May and finally campaign manager in June; he resigned in August 2016. Manafort picked his long-time business associate Rick Gates as deputy chairman.

Manafort had lobbied during several years for Viktor Yanukovych, the pro-Russian former president of Ukraine, and his Party of Regions. He was also involved in international business and influence operations for Oleg Deripaska, a Russian aluminum magnate with close ties to Vladimir Putin. From 2005 to 2009, Manafort partnered with Rick Davis to lobby Congress and manage investments on behalf of Deripaska. Manafort often communicated with Deripaska via his "right-hand man in Kyiv", Konstantin Kilimnik, an alleged Russian intelligence operative. Kilimnik had also been working since 2014 with W. Samuel Patten, an American lobbyist, to further the interests of the Ukrainian Opposition Bloc party in the United States.

- 1987: Kilimnik attends the Military Institute of the Ministry of Defense from 1987 until 1992.
- 2001–2004: Patten and Kilimnik work together at the International Republican Institute (IRI). Patten runs the think tank's Moscow office and considers Kilimnik a key employee.
- 2004: Manafort begins his relationship with his patron, Deripaska.
- 2005: Kilimnik leaves the IRI to work for Manafort in Ukraine.
- June 23, 2005: Paul Manafort and his business partner Rick Davis propose a plan to Deripaska under which they would influence news coverage, business dealings, and politics in the former Soviet Union, Europe, and the United States "to benefit President Vladimir Putin's government." They eventually sign a $10 million contract that starts in 2006 using LOAV Ltd. instead of Davis-Manafort; they maintain a business relationship until at least 2009.
- January 2006: Davis introduces Senators John McCain, Saxby Chambliss, and John E. Sununu to Deripaska at the World Economic Forum in Davos. They meet at a private apartment and have dinner at Peter Munk's ski chalet. Later in the month, Deripaska sends Davis and Manafort a letter thanking Davis for arranging the meeting with the senators.
- 2007: Manafort and Davis found Pericles Emerging Markets, an investment fund solely backed by Deripaska.
- 2007–2012: Manafort receives $12.7 million in undisclosed cash payments from Viktor Yanukovych's pro-Russian Ukrainian Party of Regions.

2008

- Deripaska transfers $18.9 million to Pericles Emerging Markets to purchase Black Sea Cable. It is unclear what happened to the money: Deripaska demands an accounting of the funds in 2013, sues Pericles in 2014, and sues Manafort in 2018.
- A spokesperson for Deripaska denies he ever hired Manafort's consulting company.
- November: Davis-Manafort is disbanded shortly after the presidential election.
- 2010: Deripaska lends $10 million to a company jointly owned by Manafort and his wife.

2013

- March 13: The FBI interviews Manafort about his offshore business dealings.
- March 19: Manafort has dinner with Rohrabacher as part of his lobbying efforts for the government of Ukraine. Vin Weber, a partner at Mercury Affairs, is also in attendance. Three days later, Manafort gives Rohrabacher a $1,000 campaign contribution. Richard Gates, Manafort's deputy, pleads guilty in 2018 to lying about the meeting to the FBI.

2014

- Patten provides lobbying and consulting services to the Ukrainian Opposition Bloc political party and Lyovochkin, a party leader, without registering as a foreign agent. He travels many times to Ukraine to meet with Lyovochkin and Kilimnik.
- Patten works for Cambridge Analytica to hone their microtargeting operations during the 2014 midterm elections.
- July 2: The FBI interviews Richard Gates about his international business dealings.
- July 30: The FBI interviews Manafort about his international business dealings.
- November 21: Bruce Ohr and Christopher Steele discuss cultivating Deripaska as a U.S. intelligence asset.

2015

- Patten and Kilimnik start a consulting firm together in Washington, D.C., called Begemot Ventures International Ltd. The firm provides consulting services in Ukraine and lobbying services in the U.S. for Ukrainian political parties without registering as a foreign agent. Begemot shares office space with Cambridge Analytica.
- January 19–21: Patten and Kilimnik coordinate to arrange meetings for Serhiy Lyovochkin with members of the Senate Foreign Relations and the House Foreign Affairs committees, with officials from the State Department, and with numerous members of the U.S. media. In August 2018, Patten pleads guilty to failing to register as a foreign agent for this work.
- May: Patten and Kilimnik write a letter for Lyovochkin to use in lobbying a "high-ranking member" of the State Department. In August 2018, Patten pleads guilty to failing to register as a foreign agent for this work.
- May 4: Manafort meets with Kilimnik.
- May 7: Kilimnik and Manafort meet for breakfast in New York City. According to Manafort, they discuss events in Ukraine, and Manafort gives Kilimnik a briefing on the Trump campaign with the expectation that Kilimnik will repeat the information to people in Ukraine and elsewhere. After the meeting, Manafort instructs Gates to begin passing internal campaign polling data and other updates to Kilimnik to share with Ukrainian oligarchs. Gates periodically sends the data using WhatsApp.
- September: The FBI and Ohr try to recruit Deripaska as an informant on the Kremlin and Russian organized crime in exchange for a U.S. visa. Steele helped set up the meeting.

2016

- February 29: Manafort submits a five-page proposal to Trump outlining his qualifications to help Trump secure enough convention delegates and win the Republican presidential nomination. Manafort describes how he assisted several business and political leaders, notably in Russia and Ukraine.
- March 28: Manafort is brought on to the campaign to lead the delegate-wrangling effort. According to Gates, Manafort travels to Mar-a-Lago in Florida to ask for the job, without pay, and is hired on the spot. In 2018, Gates tells Mueller's team that Manafort's intention was to monetize his relationship with the new administration should Trump win.
- March 29:
  - On Stone's recommendation, Manafort joins the Trump campaign as convention manager, tasked with lining up delegates.
  - The Trump campaign announces that Manafort will be the campaign's Convention Manager.
- March 30:
  - Alexandra Chalupa, who worked in the White House Office of Public Liaison during the Clinton administration, briefs the DNC's communications staff on Manafort's and Trump's ties to Russia.
  - Gates sends four memoranda written by Manafort to Kilimnik for translation and distribution. The memoranda, addressed separately to Deripaska and Ukrainian oligarchs Lyovochkin, Akhmetov, and Boris Kolesnikov, describe Manafort's new role with the Trump campaign and express his willingness to continue consulting on Ukrainian politics. Manafort follows-up with Kilimnik on April 11 to ensure the messages were sent and seen by the recipients.
- April 11: Manafort and Konstantin Kilimnik exchange emails about whether recent press coverage of Manafort joining the Trump campaign can be used to make them "whole" with Deripaska. Manafort is in debt to Deripaska for millions of dollars at the time. Kilimnik confirms to Manafort that Deripaska is aware Manafort is on Trump's campaign team.
- May 19: Manafort becomes Trump's campaign chairman and chief strategist. Gates is appointed deputy campaign chairman.
- June 1–2: Deripaska and Anton Inyutsyn, the Russian Deputy Minister of Energy, attend the Clean Energy Ministerial in San Francisco, California. Deripaska also visits UC Berkeley. The trip coincides with nearby Trump rallies in Sacramento and San Jose.
- June 20: Trump fires Lewandowski. Manafort becomes campaign manager.
- July 7: In an email exchange, Manafort and Kilimnik discuss whether his campaign work is helping his relationship with Deripaska. Kilimnik writes that Deripaska is paying significantly more attention to the campaign and expects him to reach out to Manafort soon. Using his official Trump campaign email address, Manafort asks Kilimnik to forward an offer to provide "private briefings" to Deripaska.
- July 24: Appearing on This Week, Manafort denies there are any links between him, Trump, or the "campaign and Putin and his regime".
- July 29: Kilimnik sends Manafort an email requesting to meet in person so he can brief Manafort on a meeting he had "with the guy who gave you your biggest black caviar jar several years ago", saying he has important messages to deliver from this person. In September 2017, The Washington Post reports that investigators believe Kilimnik and Manafort used the term "black caviar" in communications as a reference to expected payments from former clients. In December 2018, TIME magazine reveals that the names "Victor" and "V." mentioned in the emails between Kilimnik and Manafort refer to Deripaska aide and former Russian intelligence officer Commander Viktor A. Boyarkin. In 2018, Manafort tells Mueller's team that "the guy" was Yanukovych, who gave him a $30,000–$40,000 jar of caviar in 2010 to celebrate being elected President of Ukraine.
- July 31: Kilimnik again emails Manafort to confirm their dinner meeting in New York, saying he needs two hours "because it is a long caviar story to tell."
- August 2: Manafort, Gates, and Kilimnik meet at the Grand Havana Room of 666 Fifth Avenue in New York City. This meeting is considered the "heart" of Mueller's probe, per February 2019 reporting. Manafort gives Kilimnik polling data and a briefing on campaign strategy, and, according to Gates, discusses the "battleground" states Michigan, Minnesota, Pennsylvania, and Wisconsin. Manafort asks Kilimnik to pass the data to pro-Russian Ukrainians Serhiy Lyovochkin and Rinat Akhmetov. Kilimnik gives Manafort a message from Yanukovych about a peace plan for Ukraine that is an opportunity for Russian control of the region. The plan would require Trump's support and Manafort's influence in Europe. The two discuss Manafort's financial disputes with Deripaska and the Opposition Bloc in Ukraine. They leave separately to avoid media reporting on Manafort's connections to Kilimnik.
- August 3: A private jet carrying Deripaska's family arrives at Newark Liberty International Airport near New York City a little after midnight New York time and returns to Moscow that afternoon. The trip's timing is considered suspicious because it is within hours of Manafort's meeting with Kilimnik. In 2018, a spokesperson for Deripaska confirms the flights and passengers.
- August 14: The New York Times reports that Manafort's name has been found in the Ukrainian "black ledger". The ledger, belonging to the Ukrainian Party of Regions, shows $12.7 million in undisclosed cash payments to Manafort from 2007 to 2012. Manafort's lawyer, Richard A. Hibey, says Manafort never received "any such cash payments". The Associated Press later verifies some of the entries against financial records.
- August 19:
  - Manafort resigns as Trump's campaign manager, but continues to advise Gates, Kushner, Bannon, and Trump until the election.
  - Volodymyr Ariev, a member of the Ukrainian parliament, formally asks the Prosecutor General of Ukraine to investigate Kilimnik based on media reports of his connections to Viktor Yanukovych and Russian intelligence.
- September: The FBI makes a second attempt to recruit Deripaska as an informant on Manafort, the Kremlin, and Russian organized crime in exchange for a U.S. visa.
- November: Manafort and Gates falsely assert in writing to the Justice Department that their work for the Ukrainian government did not require registering as foreign agents in the United States. In September 2018, Manafort pleads guilty to lying to the Justice Department about the extent of his work for Ukraine.
- December 8: Kilimnik sends Manafort a detailed email about the proposed Ukrainian peace plan. He writes that the plan is ready to move forward if Trump appoints Manafort as a "special representative" to manage it, that "[Yanukovych] guarantees your reception at the very top level" in Russia, and that "[Trump] could have peace in Ukraine basically within a few months after inauguration."

2017

- January 12: Manafort returns to the U.S. after meeting with Deripaska deputy Georgiy Oganov in Madrid, where they discussed global politics and "recreating [the] old friendship" between Manafort and Deripaska.
- January 15: Manafort emails McFarland, copying Flynn, about "some important information I want to share that I picked up on my travels over the last month." Flynn advises McFarland not to respond. In 2018, Manafort tells Mueller's team that he was referring to Cuba, which he had visited along with other countries at the time, and not Russia or Ukraine.
- January 18/19: McClatchy and The New York Times report that Manafort, Page and Stone have been under investigation by the FBI, NSA, CIA, and FinCEN, based on intercepted Russian communications and financial transactions. Sources say "the investigators have accelerated their efforts in recent weeks but have found no conclusive evidence of wrongdoing."

== Papadopoulos, Mifsud, Polonskaya, Timofeev, Millian, Halper and Downer ==
George Papadopoulos was an advisor to the Trump campaign on foreign policy. During the campaign, he had contacts with:

- Joseph Mifsud, a Maltese academic and former diplomat, connected with Russian politicians, who has taught at the Link Campus University. Mifsud told Papadopoulos that the Russian government had damaging information about Hillary Clinton.
- Olga Polonskaya, an associate of Mifsud who falsely claimed to be Putin's niece.
- Ivan Timofeev, the program director of the Kremlin-sponsored Valdai Discussion Club, and a member of the Russian International Affairs Council (RIAC)
- Sergei Millian, who introduced himself as "president of [the] New York-based Russian American Chamber of Commerce"
- Stefan Halper, an American professor, former CIA operative, and FBI informant for the Crossfire Hurricane investigation into the Trump campaign
- Alexander Downer, Australian ambassador to the United Kingdom, who tipped the FBI about information he heard from Papadopoulos

Papadopoulos later married Simona Mangiante, an Italian lawyer whom he had met when she worked for Mifsud.

2012

- Italian MEP Gianni Pittella introduces Simona Mangiante to Mifsud in Brussels. Mangiante worked for the European Parliament as an attorney specializing in child abduction cases.

2015

- July 15: Papadopoulos contacts Trump campaign manager Corey Lewandowski about joining the campaign as a policy advisor.
- August: Papadopoulos emails Michael Glassner, the executive director of Trump's campaign committee, expressing further interest in joining the campaign as a policy advisor. He continues corresponding with Glassner and Lewandowski for months, but is repeatedly told no position is available for him.
- December: Unable to find a position in the Trump campaign, Papadopoulos joins the Ben Carson campaign.

2016

- February 4: Papadopoulos contacts Lewandowski via LinkedIn and emails Glassner about joining the Trump campaign.
- February 4–6: Looking for a job after his role at the Carson campaign is over, Papadopoulos reaches out to the London Centre of International Law Practice (LCILP), headed by Mifsud. He obtains a position at their London office, and works there from February to April.
- March 2: Papadopoulos emails Glassner to reiterate that he is free again to join Trump's campaign. On Glassner's instructions, Joy Lutes introduces Papadopoulos to national co-chair and chief policy advisor Sam Clovis.
- March 3: Clovis researches Papadopoulos on Google. Clovis is impressed with his past work at the Hudson Institute and arranges a phone call for March 6.
- March 6: Clovis asks Papadopoulos to join the Trump campaign as a foreign policy advisor after discussing the position in a phone call. The campaign hires Papadopoulos on Ben Carson's recommendation. Clovis tells Papadopoulos that improving relations with Russia is a top foreign policy goal.
- March 14: Papadopoulos first meets Mifsud while in Rome on a trip to visit officials affiliated with Link Campus University as part of his job at the LCILP. After Papadopoulos mentions his position with the Trump campaign, Mifsud shows more interest, and offers to introduce him to European leaders and other people with contacts to the Russian government.
- March 17: Papadopoulos returns to London from his Rome trip.
- March 21: In a Washington Post interview, Trump names members of his foreign policy team, including Papadopoulos and Page.
- March 24:
  - In London, Papadopoulos meets Mifsud and Olga Polonskaya, who falsely claims to be Putin's niece. Polonskaya tells Papadopoulos that she is a friend of the Russian ambassador in London and offers to help establish contacts with Russia. Papadopoulos leaves the meeting with the expectation that he will be introduced to the Russian ambassador, but it never occurs. Polonskaya is in regular email contact with Papadopoulos, in one message writing, "We are all very excited by the possibility of a good relationship with Mr. Trump".
  - Papadopoulos emails Trump campaign officials about his new Russian contacts. He emails Trump's foreign policy team that he met with Putin's niece and the Russian ambassador in London, and claims the ambassador also acts as the Deputy Foreign Minister of Russia. He writes that the Russian leadership wants to meet with campaign officials in a "neutral" city or Moscow "to discuss U.S.-Russia ties under President Trump", and that Putin and the Russian leadership are ready to meet with Trump. Clovis replies that he thinks any meetings with Russians should be delayed until after the campaign has a chance to talk with NATO allies and "we have everyone on the same page."
  - Papadopoulos searches Google for information on Polonskaya and discovers that she is not Putin's niece.
- March 29: Polonskaya attempts to send Papadopoulos a text message that was drafted by Mifsud. The message addresses Papadopoulos's "wish to engage with the Russian Federation."
- March 31: The first meeting of Trump's foreign policy team is held at the yet-to-open Trump International Hotel Washington, D.C. With Trump and Sessions in attendance, Papadopoulos speaks of his connections with Russia, and offers to negotiate a meeting between Trump and Putin. Sessions later states he opposed the idea, and two people who were present support his assertions, but differ in what he objected to and how strongly. In late summer 2017 Papadopoulos and Gordon tell Mueller's team that Trump was "supportive and receptive to the idea of a meeting with Putin," and that Sessions supported Papadopoulos's efforts to arrange a meeting. Papadopoulos's lawyers assert in a September 2018 court filing that Trump nodded in agreement to the offer, and that Sessions said the campaign should look into it.
- April 10–11: Papadopoulos learns of Polonskaya's attempt to send him a text message on March 29 and sends her an email to arrange another meeting. She responds that she is "back in St. Petersburg" but "would be very pleased to support [Papadopoulos's] initiatives between our two countries" and "to meet [him] again." Papadopoulos replies that she should introduce him to "the Russian Ambassador in London" to talk to him or "anyone else you recommend, about a potential foreign policy trip to Russia." Mifsud is copied on the email exchange. Mifsud writes, "This is already been agreed. I am flying to Moscow on the 18th for a Valdai meeting, plus other meetings at the Duma. We will talk tomorrow." Polonskaya responds that she has "already alerted my personal links to our conversation and your request," that "we are all very excited the possibility of a good relationship with Mr. Trump," and that "[t]he Russian Federation would love to welcome him once his candidature would be officially announced."
- April 12: Papadopoulos and Mifsud meet at the Andaz Hotel in London.
- April 18: While in Moscow, Mifsud introduces Papadopoulos to Ivan Timofeev via email. Timodeev is the program director of the Kremlin-sponsored Valdai Discussion Club and a member of the Russian International Affairs Council (RIAC). Papadopoulos and Timofeev communicate for months over email and Skype about potential meetings between Russian government officials and members of the Trump campaign. Later records indicate that Timofeev discussed Papadopoulos with former Russian Foreign Minister Igor S. Ivanov. In August 2017, Papadopoulos tells Mueller's team that he believed at the time his conversations with Timofeev were monitored.
- April 22: Timofeev thanks Papadopoulos "for an extensive talk" and proposes meeting in London or Moscow.
- April 25:
  - Timofeev emails Papadopoulos that he spoke to Ivanov, "the President of RIAC and former Foreign Minister of Russia," and relays Ivanov's advice on how best to arrange a "Moscow visit."
  - Before the second Mifsud meeting, Papadopoulos emails Stephen Miller, informing him that "[t]he Russian government has an open invitation by Putin for Mr. Trump to meet him when he is ready" and that "[t]he advantage of being in London is that these governments tend to speak a bit more openly in 'neutral' cities."
  - Papadopoulos meets Mifsud in London again at the Andaz Hotel. Mifsud claims that he has learned that Russians are in possession of thousands of stolen emails that may be politically damaging to Clinton. This is the first of at least two times the Trump campaign is told Russia has "dirt" on Hillary Clinton. Two months later the Russian hacking is publicly revealed.
- April 27:
  - Trump speaks at the Mayflower Hotel at the invitation of The National Interest, the magazine of the CNI. He delivers a speech that calls for improved relations between the US and Russia. The speech was edited by Papadopoulos and crafted with the assistance of Simes and Richard Burt. Burt is a board member of the CNI and a lobbyist for Gazprom. Papadopoulos brings the speech to the attention of Mifsud and Polonskaya, and tells Timofeev that it should be considered "the signal to meet". Simes later moves to Moscow.
  - Papadopoulos emails Stephen Miller that he has "some interesting messages coming in from Moscow about a trip when the time is right."
  - Papadopoulos tells Lewandowski via email that he has "been receiving a lot of calls over the last month about Putin wanting to host [Trump] and the team when the time is right."
- May 4: Timofeev emails Papadopoulos that his colleagues from the ministry "are open for cooperation." Papadopoulos forwards the email to Lewandowski and asks whether this is "something we want to move forward with."
- May 5: Papadopoulos forwards Timofeev's email to Clovis, who replies, "[t]here are legal issues we need to mitigate, meeting with foreign officials as a private citizen."
- May 6: In London, during a night of heavy drinking, Papadopoulos tells Australian ambassador Alexander Downer that the Russians have politically damaging material on Clinton. After WikiLeaks releases the DNC emails two months later, Australian officials pass this information to American officials, causing the FBI to open a counterintelligence investigation into the Trump campaign.
- May 8: Timofeev proposes connecting Papadopoulos with another Russian official.
- May 14: Papadopoulos tells Lewandowski the Russians are interested in hosting Trump.
- May 21: Papadopoulos forwards Timofeev's May 4 email to Manafort stressing that the Russian Ministry of Foreign Affairs (MFA) wishes to meet with Trump. He writes: "Russia has been eager to meet Mr. Trump for quite sometime and have been reaching out to me to discuss." Manafort shoots down the idea in an email to Rick Gates, with a note: "Let[']s discuss. We need someone to communicate that DT is not doing these trips. It should be someone low level in the Campaign so as not to send any signal."
- May 27–28: Putin makes an official visit to Greece and meets with President Prokopios Pavlopoulos, Defense Minister Panagiotis Kammenos, Prime Minister Alexis Tsipras, and Foreign Minister Nikolaos Kotzias. His visit overlaps with a trip to Greece by Papadopoulos, during which Kammenos introduces him to Pavlopoulos, Kotzias, and a former prime minister.
- June 1: Papadopoulos emails Lewandowski asking whether he wants to have a call about a Russia visit and whether "we were following up with it." Lewandowski refers him to Clovis. Papadopoulos emails Clovis about more interest from the Russian Ministry of Foreign Affairs to set up a Trump meeting in Russia. He writes, "I have the Russian MFA asking me if Mr. Trump is interested in visiting Russia at some point." He continues that he "[w]anted to pass this info along to you for you to decide what's best to do with it and what message I should send (or to ignore)."
- June 19: After communicating with the MFA via email and Skype, Papadopoulos tells Lewandowski by email that the MFA is interested in meeting with a "campaign rep" if Trump can't meet with them. Papadopoulos offers to go in an unofficial capacity.
- July 11–12: Papadopoulos and fellow campaign foreign policy advisor Walid Phares exchange emails discussing the upcoming Transatlantic Parliamentary Group on Counterterrorism (TAG) conference, of which Phares is also co-secretary general. In the email chain, Phares advises Papadopoulos that other summit attendees "are very nervous about Russia. So be aware."
- July 15: Sergei Millian reaches out to Papadopoulos on LinkedIn, introducing himself "as president of [the] New York-based Russian American Chamber of Commerce." He claims to have "insider knowledge and direct access to the top hierarchy in Russian politics."
- July 16: Papadopoulos, Clovis, and Phares attend the TAG conference. Contemporaneous handwritten notes in Papadopoulos's journal show that he, Clovis, and Phares discuss potential September meetings with representatives of the "office of Putin" in London. The notes say they will attend as unofficial campaign representatives. Later Clovis tells a grand jury that he does not recall attending the TAG conference, although a photograph from the conference shows him seated next to Papadopoulos.
- July 22–26: Papadopoulos asks Timofeev about Millian. Timofeev responds that he hasn't heard of him.
- July 26: The Australian government informs the U.S. government of Papadopoulos's May 6 interactions with their ambassador in London, prompting the FBI to start investigating potential coordination between Russia and the Trump campaign on July 31.
- July 30: Papadopoulos meets with Millian in New York City.
- July 31: Papadopoulos emails Trump campaign official Bo Denysyk saying that he has been contacted "by some leaders of Russian-American voters here in the US about their interest in voting for Mr. Trump." He asks whether he should put Denysyk in contact with their group (the US-Russia chamber of commerce). Denysyk responds that Papadopoulos should "hold off with outreach to Russian-Americans" because "too many articles" portray the campaign, Manafort, and Trump as "pro-Russian."
- July 31 – August 2: The FBI sends two agents to London who interview Downer about his interactions with Papadopoulos.
- August 1: Papadopoulos meets with Millian a second time in New York City.
- August 2–3: Millian invites Papadopoulos to attend and possibly speak at two international energy conferences, including one in Moscow in September. Papadopoulos does not attend the conferences.
- August 15: Papadopoulos emails Clovis about requests he received from multiple foreign governments, "even Russia[]," for "closed door workshops/consultations abroad." He asks if there is still interest for himself, Clovis, and Phares "to go on that trip." Clovis copies Phares and tells Papadopoulos that he can't "travel before the election", writing, "I would encourage you [and Walid Phares to] make the trip, if it is feasible." The trip never occurs.
- August 23: Millian sends a Facebook message to Papadopoulos offering to "share with you a disruptive technology that might be instrumental in your political work for the campaign." In September 2017, Papadopoulos tells the FBI he does not recall the matter.
- August 31 or September 1: FBI informant Stefan Halper meets with Trump advisor Sam Clovis, who stated they talked about China.
- September:
  - The Egyptian Embassy in Washington, D.C., reaches out to Papadopoulos expressing Egyptian President Abdel Fattah el-Sisi's interest in meeting Trump. With Bannon's approval, Papadopoulos arranges a meeting between Trump and el-Sisi at the Plaza Hotel in New York City. While the meeting does not appear to relate to campaign contacts with Russia, it highlights that Papadopoulos was more than a "coffee boy", as Trump campaign officials later claim.
  - Mifsud hires Mangiante to work for the LCILP, on Pittella's recommendation. Papadopoulos, a former employee of the Centre, contacts her via LinkedIn. They begin dating in March 2017.
- September 9: Papadopoulos contacts deputy communications director Bryan Lanza about a request from Interfax for an interview with Ksenia Baygarova. Lanza approves the interview.
- Mid-September: Papadopoulos approaches British government officials asking for a meeting with senior ministers. He is given a meeting with a mid-level Foreign Office official in London. Papadopoulos mentions he has senior contacts in the Russian government. British officials conclude he is not a major player and discontinue contact.
- September 15: Papadopoulos meets with Stefan Halper's research assistant Azra Turk for drinks in London. She asks him questions about whether the Trump campaign was working with Russia. Papadopoulos becomes suspicious about her line of questioning, and comes to believe Turk is an intelligence agent, possibly from Turkey. In May 2019, The New York Times reports that Turk was an undercover FBI agent supervising Halper's inquiries into possible connections between the Trump Campaign and Russia.
- September 25: Halper asks Papadopoulos if he is aware of any efforts by Russians to interfere with the 2016 election; Papadopoulos twice denies it.
- September 30: Ksenia Baygarova interviews Papadopoulos for Interfax on Trump's foreign policy positions in relation to Russia. The interview was approved by Trump campaign deputy communications director Bryan Lanza. Baygarova later tells The Washington Post that she had been tasked to interview a representative from each campaign. She says Papadopoulos was the only person from the Trump campaign to respond. She describes him as not very experienced. Adverse publicity generated by the interview leads to Papadopoulous being fired from the campaign in October.
- November: Mangiante quits the LCILP after complaining to Mifsud about not being paid her salary.
- November 9: Papadopoulos and Millian make arrangements to meet in Chicago to discuss business opportunities, including with Russian "billionaires who are not under sanctions."
- November 14: Papadopoulos and Millian meet at the Chicago Trump International Hotel and Tower. Millian appears nervous to Papadopoulos, as he offers him a job for "a Russian billionaire not under sanctions." The job would require him to continue working for Trump, and join the new administration. Papadopoulos declines the offer, saying he is only interested in private sector jobs. Later, Papadopoulos said he refused the job because he knew it was unethical and possibly illegal, and feared it might have been an FBI setup.

== Goldstone, Veselnitskaya and the Trump Tower meeting ==
Rob Goldstone is the British publicist for Russian pop singer Emin Agalarov, son of real estate magnate Aras Agalarov who had organized Miss Universe 2013 in Moscow with Trump. In 2016 Goldstone made several overtures to the Trump campaign, offering notably to arrange a meeting between Trump and Putin. In June he set up the Trump Tower meeting, in which Natalia Veselnitskaya was supposed to deliver political "dirt" on Hillary Clinton. Instead, she discussed the Magnitsky Act. Ike Kaveladze, a Georgian-American senior vice president at the Crocus Group, also attended the meeting.

2015

- July 22: Trump receives an invitation to Moscow for the 60th birthday of Aras Agalarov, who co-hosted the Miss Universe pageant with him in 2013.
- July 24: Trump's assistant Rhona Graff replies that Trump is unlikely to attend the birthday party due to his campaign schedule. Goldstone suggests that Emin Agalarov could arrange a meeting between Putin and Trump if he comes.

2016

- January 19: Goldstone emails Trump Jr. and Graff, suggesting to promote Trump's candidacy on VKontakte (VK), Russia's most prominent social network. Graff forwards the request to Dan Scavino, the campaign's social media director.
- January 20: Konstantin Sidorkov, an executive at VKontakte, emails Trump Jr., Graff and Scavino about setting up a page for Trump's campaign and promoting it to its nearly 100 million users. He will send a similar offer again on November 5, 2016.
- February 29: Trump receives a letter from Aras Agalarov expressing "great interest" in Trump's "bright electoral campaign."
- April 1–3:
  - Rohrabacher meets with Natalia Veselnitskaya in Moscow to discuss the Magnitsky Act. Vladimir Yakunin, under U.S. sanctions, is also present. Rohrabacher later says he met Yakunin at the request of Kislyak. He also meets with officials at the Russian Prosecutor General's office, where he receives a document full of accusations against Magnitsky. U.S. Embassy officials are worried Rohrabacher may be meeting with FSB agents. The meeting at the prosecutor's office is not on his itinerary. The document is given to Rohrabacher by Deputy Prosecutor Viktor Grin, who is under U.S. sanctions authorized by the Magnitsky Act. Rohrabacher subsequently uses the document in efforts to undermine the Magnitsky Act. His accepting the document from Grin, a sanctioned individual, and using it to influence U.S. government policy leads to a July 21, 2017, complaint being filed against Rohrabacher and his staff director, Paul Behrends, for violating Magnitsky Act sanctions.
  - While in Moscow with Rohrabacher, Rohrabacher's aide Paul Behrends introduces Congressman French Hill to Veselnitskaya and Rinat Akhmetshin. Veselnitskaya gives Hill a document nearly identical to the one Grin gave to Rohrabacher.
- May: A new American shell company, "Silver Valley Consulting", is set up by Russian-born accountant Ilya Bykov for Aras Agalarov.
- Early June: Before traveling to New York to translate at the June 9 Trump Tower meeting, Kaveladze contacts Roman Beniaminov, a close associate of Emin Agalarov, to find out why Kushner, Manafort, and Trump Jr. were invited to a meeting ostensibly about the Magnitsky Act. Beniaminov tells Kaveladze that he heard Goldstone and Agalarov discuss "dirt" on Clinton. In November 2017, Kaveladze's lawyer tells The Daily Beast that Beniaminov was Kaveladze's only source of information about the meeting.
- June 3:
  - Aras Agalarov is told that the Russian government wants to give the Trump campaign damaging information about Clinton.
  - Goldstone emails Trump Jr. offering, on behalf of Emin Agalarov, to meet an alleged Russian government official who "would incriminate Hillary and her dealings with Russia and would be very useful to your father", as "part of Russia and its government's support for Mr. Trump." Trump Jr. respond 17 minutes later: "If it's what you say I love it especially later in the summer," and schedules the meeting. Goldstone also offers to relay the information to Trump through his assistant. This is the second time a Trump campaign official was told of "dirt" on Clinton.
  - $3.3 million began moving between Aras Agalarov and Kaveladze, a longtime Agalarov employee once investigated for money laundering.
- June 6:
  - Goldstone follows up with Trump Jr. about when Jr. can "talk with Emin by phone about this Hillary info." Trump Jr. calls Emin. Phone records show Trump Jr. called two blocked numbers at Trump Tower before and after calls to Emin. According to CNN, the two people Trump Jr. called were Nascar CEO Brian France and businessman Howard Lorber.
  - According to Rick Gates, Trump Jr. informs the participants in a regular senior campaign staff meeting that he has a lead on damaging information about the Clinton Foundation. Gates is under the impression that the information is coming from a group in Kyrgyzstan. The other meeting participants include Eric Trump, Ivanka Trump, Jared Kushner, Paul Manafort, and Hope Hicks. Manafort, according to Gates, warns the group to be careful. In April 2018, Kushner tells Mueller's team that he doesn't remember the information being discussed before the June 9 meeting.
- June 9:
  - Veselnitskaya, Akhmetshin, Kaveladze, and Anatoli Samochornov meet for lunch and discuss what to say at the upcoming Trump Tower meeting.
  - Kushner, Manafort and Trump Jr. meet at Trump Tower with Goldstone, Veselnitskaya, Akhmetshin, Kaveladze, and translator Samochornov. Veselnitskaya is best known for lobbying against the Magnitsky Act, an American law that blacklists suspected Russian human rights abusers. Trump Jr. later says that he asked Veselnitskaya for damaging information about the Clinton Foundation and that she had none. Samochornov, Kaveladze, and Akhmetshin later tell the Senate Judiciary Committee that Trump Jr. told Veselnitskaya to come back after they won the election. The meeting lasts approximately 20 minutes, and Manafort takes notes on his phone.
- June 20: Aras Agalarov wires more than $19.5 million to his account at a bank in New York.
- June 29: Goldstone again emails Scavino about promoting Trump on VKontakte. He says the email is a follow-up to his recent conversation with Trump Jr. and Manafort.
- November 5: Sidorkov sends a new VKontakte promotion offer to Trump Jr. and Scavino.
- November 23–28: Kaveladze and Goldstone attempt to set up a meeting between Veselnitskaya and the Trump transition team during her trip to the U.S.

== Carter Page ==
Carter Page is a petroleum industry consultant specialized in the Russian and Central Asian markets., who had been a target of Russian intelligence recruitment efforts in 2013 and 2015. He worked as an informal foreign policy advisor to the Trump campaign from March to September 2016, and made a trip to Moscow in July 2016 purporting to represent the campaign. His activities were investigated by the FBI, and he was the subject of several FISA surveillance warrants. He was not indicted by the Mueller probe.

2013

- January: Page passes documents about the oil market to Victor Podobnyy, a Russian intelligence agent. He later claims the documents were public information. Podobnyy is charged with being an unregistered foreign agent in 2015.
- April 13: Two agents of the Russian Foreign Intelligence Service (SVR) discuss recruiting Page.
- July 3: Page schedules a dinner with potential investor Russian oligarch Viktor Vekselberg to pitch his fledgling natural gas business. It is unclear whether the meeting took place.
- August 25: Page sends a letter to an academic press in which he claims to be an adviser to the Kremlin.

2015

- January 23: A court filing by the U.S. government contains a transcript of a recorded conversation between two members of a Russian SVR spy ring, Victor Podobnyy and Igor Sporyshev. Their conversation concerns efforts to recruit "Male-1", later confirmed as Carter Page. Podobnyy calls Page an "idiot" and tells Sporyshev, "You get the documents from him and tell him to go fuck himself".

2016

- January 30: Page emails senior Trump Campaign officials, including Glassner, informing them that his discussions with "high level contacts" with "close ties to the Kremlin" led him to believe "a direct meeting in Moscow between Mr[.] Trump and Putin could be arranged."
- March: Page begins working for the Trump campaign as an unpaid foreign policy adviser. He was recommended by Sam Clovis.
- March 21: In a Washington Post interview, Trump names members of his foreign policy team, including Papadopoulos and Page. Page had helped open the Moscow office of investment banking firm Merrill Lynch and advised Russian state-owned energy giant Gazprom, in which Page is an investor. He had blamed 2014 US sanctions relating to Russia's annexation of Crimea for driving down Gazprom's stock price.
- March 28: Clovis emails Lewandowski and other campaign officials praising Page's work for the campaign.
- April 1: Page is invited to deliver a commencement address at the New Economic School in Moscow in July.
- May 16: Page floats with Clovis, Gordon, and Phares the idea of Trump going to Russia in his place to give the commencement speech at the New Economic School "to raise the temperature a little bit."
- Early June: At a closed-door gathering of foreign policy experts visiting with the Prime Minister of India, Page hails Putin as stronger and more reliable than Obama and touts the positive effect a Trump presidency would have on U.S.–Russia relations.
- June 19: Page again requests permission from the campaign to speak at the New Economic School commencement in Moscow, and reiterates that the school "would love to have Mr. Trump speak at this annual celebration." Lewandowski responds that Page can attend in his personal capacity but "Mr. Trump will not be able to attend."
- Summer: The FBI applies for a FISA warrant to monitor communications of four Trump campaign officials. The FISA Court rejects the application, asking the FBI to narrow its scope. A warrant on Page alone is granted in October 2016.
- July: Page makes a five-day trip to Moscow.
- July 5–6: Denis Klimentov emails his brother Dmitri and Director of the MFA's Information and Press Department Maria Zakharova about Page's visit to Moscow and his connection to the Trump campaign. He offers to contact Page on behalf of the MFA. Dmitri Klimentov then contacts Peskov about introducing Page to Russian government officials. The next day, Peskov replies, "I have read about [Page]. Specialists say that he is far from being the main one. So I better not initiate a meeting in the Kremlin."
- July 7: In a lecture at the New Economic School in Moscow, Page criticizes American foreign policy, saying that many of the mistakes spoiling relations between the US and Russia "originated in my own country." Page had received permission from the Trump campaign to make the trip.
- July 8: Page emails Dahl and Gordon about outreach he received "from a few Russian legislators and senior members of the Presidential Administration here."
- July 9: Page emails Clovis and describes a private meeting with Deputy Prime Minister of Russia Arkady Dvorkovich. He says Dvorkovich "expressed strong support for Mr. Trump and a desire to work together toward devising better solutions in response to the vast range of current international problems."
- July 11–12: FBI informant Stefan Halper has an initial encounter with Page at a London symposium. A former federal law enforcement official tells The New York Times the encounter was a coincidence, rather than at the FBI's direction.
- July 18: Page and Gordon meet Kislyak at the Republican convention; as Trump's foreign policy advisers, they stress that he would like to improve relations with Russia.
- July 19: Steele files a dossier memo alleging that during his Moscow trip, Page met Rosneft chairman Igor Sechin, and discussed the possible lifting of sanctions against Russia. In his congressional testimony, Page denies meeting with the Russians named in the dossier. He says he met Sechin's associate Andrey Baranov, but says "nothing that this gentleman said to me ever implied or asked for anything related to sanctions. Again, there may have been some general reference ... but no kind of negotiations in any format".
- August: Crossfire Hurricane investigators discuss obtaining a warrant to wiretap Page with their DoJ superiors.
- August 5: In response to questions about Page's July 7 speech in Moscow, Hope Hicks describes him as an "informal foreign policy adviser [who] does not speak for Mr. Trump or the campaign."
- September 23: Yahoo News reports that U.S. intelligence officials are investigating whether Page has set up private communications between the Trump campaign and senior Russian officials, including talks on possibly lifting sanctions if Trump is elected. The report leads to an email discussion between J. Miller, Bannon, and Stephen Miller about removing Page from the campaign.
- September 24: Page is formally removed from the Trump campaign. Publicly, the campaign denies all knowledge of Page.
- September 25:
  - Hicks emails Conway and Bannon instructing them to answer inquiries about Page with "[h]e was an informal advisor in March. Since then he has had no role or official contact with the campaign. We have no knowledge of activities past or present and he now officially has been removed from all lists etc."
  - When asked by CNN about allegations linking Page to Russia, Conway denies that Page is part of the Trump campaign.
  - Page sends Comey a letter asking that the FBI drop the reported investigation into his activities in Russia. He denies meeting with sanctioned Russian officials.
- September 26: Page tells Josh Rogin in an interview for The Washington Post that he is taking a leave of absence from the Trump campaign. He denies meeting with sanctioned individuals in Moscow.
- October 19: The FBI and the US Department of Justice (DoJ) apply for a FISA warrant to conduct surveillance on Page. In its approval, the FISA Court finds there is probable cause to believe Page is a Russian agent.
- October 21: DoJ and FBI request and obtain new FISA wiretap on Carter Page.
- November 14: Page submits an application to the Trump transition team for a position in the new administration. The team never responds.

2017

- January: The FBI obtains a new FISA warrant for Page, replacing the expired warrant from October 2016.

== Michael Flynn and Sergey Kislyak ==
Michael Flynn is a retired U.S. Army lieutenant general who was appointed National Security Advisor by the incoming Trump administration. He was quickly dismissed because he lied to Vice President Mike Pence about the nature of his conversations with Russian ambassador Sergey Kislyak. Kislyak was also involved in discussions with Jeff Sessions, Jared Kushner, and other Trump associates.

2015

- April: Flynn begins advising ACU Strategic Partners, a company seeking to build nuclear power plants in the Middle East involving a sanctioned Russian company.
- June 10: Flynn testifies before the House Foreign Affairs Committee on nuclear power in the Middle East. He omits his work for ACU Strategic Partners from both a committee disclosure form and his testimony.
- Late June: Flynn travels to Egypt and Israel. In September 2017, members of Congress present evidence to Mueller that Flynn's purpose was to promote a Russian-backed plan for the building of 40 nuclear reactors, with "total regional security" to be provided by U.S.-sanctioned Russian weapons exporter Rosoboron.
- October: For his remarks during a cybersecurity forum in Washington, D.C., Flynn receives $11,250 from Kaspersky Government Security Solutions Inc., the American subsidiary of Kaspersky Lab, owned by Eugene Kaspersky.
- December 2: Flynn and his son, Michael G. Flynn (called "Jr."), visit Kislyak at his home.
- December 10: Flynn gives a paid speech on world affairs in Moscow, at a gala dinner organized by RT. Flynn had appeared on RT as an analyst after retiring from the U.S. Army. Putin is the dinner's guest of honor. Flynn is seated next to Putin; also seated at the head table are Green Party presidential candidate Jill Stein and members of Putin's inner circle, including Sergei Ivanov, Dmitry Peskov, Vekselberg, and Alexey Gromov. For his speech, Flynn nets $33,500 of the $45,000 paid to his speakers bureau. For all of 2015, Flynn receives more than $65,000 from companies linked to Russia.

2016

- January: Flynn applies to renew his security clearance for five years. In an interview with security investigators he claims U.S. companies paid for his trip to the RT dinner in Moscow. Documents subsequently obtained by the House Oversight Committee show that RT paid for the trip.
- March 16: The FBI releases its Report of Investigation on Flynn's security clearance renewal application.
- April 27: Trump, Sessions and Jared Kushner greet Russian Ambassador Sergey Kislyak at the Mayflower Hotel in Washington D.C. This contact is repeatedly omitted from testimony or denied. Kushner and Sessions knew in advance that the CNI invited Kislyak to the event. Mueller's team did not find any evidence that Trump or Sessions conversed with Kislyak after Trump's speech. Afterward, Kislyak reports the conversation with Sessions to Moscow. Kushner is the first to publicly admit the Kislyak meeting took place in his prepared statement for Senate investigators on July 24, 2017. Also in attendance are the ambassadors from Italy and Singapore, who are major players in the upcoming sale of stakes in Rosneft.
- May 23: Sessions attends the CNI's Distinguished Service Award dinner at the Washington, D.C., Four Seasons Hotel. Kislyak is a confirmed guest with a reserved seat next to Sessions. In 2018, Sessions tells Mueller's team that he doesn't remember Kislyak being there, and other participants interviewed by Mueller's team disagree with each other about whether Kislyak was present.
- July 9: The Washington Post reports that Trump is considering Flynn as his running mate, with support from Senator Jeff Sessions. Trump eventually selects Mike Pence, Governor of Indiana.
- July 18: Kislyak attends the Republican convention, meeting foreign policy advisers Page and Gordon; they stress that Trump would like to improve relations with Russia. Sessions further speaks with Kislyak at a Heritage Foundation event.
- August 3: Gordon receives an invitation from a Russian Embassy official to have breakfast with Kislyak at the Ambassador's residence in Washington, D.C., the next week. Gordon declines five days later, saying he is busy with debate preparation.
- September 8: Sessions meets with Kislyak a third time in his Senate office with two members of his Senate staff, Sandra Luff and Pete Landrum. They discuss Russian military actions and the presence of NATO forces in former Soviet bloc countries bordering Russia. Kislyak invites Sessions to have further discussions with him over a meal at his residence. In 2018, Luff and Landum tell Mueller's team that they don't recall Sessions dining with Kislyak before the election.
- September 20: Flynn meets with Rohrabacher. On November 10, 2017, the Mueller investigation is reported to have asked questions about this meeting.
- November–December: Michael Flynn serves as an advisor to SCL Group, the parent company of Cambridge Analytica.
- Late November: Senior members of Trump's transition team warn Flynn about the dangers of contacting Kislyak, including that Kislyak's conversations are probably being monitored by the FBI and the NSA. Flynn is recorded a month later discussing sanctions with Kislyak.
- November 10:
  - In a private Oval Office meeting, Obama warns Trump against hiring Flynn.
  - Kislyak states that Russia was not involved with U.S. election hacking.
- November 11: Mike Pence replaces Chris Christie as chairman of the Trump transition team. Christie later claims he was fired for opposing Michael Flynn becoming the National Security Advisor. Steve Bannon and Flynn celebrate Christie's firing by ceremonially throwing binders full of administration candidates into the trash.
- November 18:
  - Trump announces he will nominate Sessions as Attorney General and Flynn as National Security Adviser.
  - Elijah Cummings, ranking member of the House Oversight Committee, sends Pence a letter warning that Flynn's connections to Russia and Turkey might create conflicts of interest. He asks the Trump administration's transition team for documents related to Flynn. Receipt of the letter is acknowledged on November 28.
- November 30: On a recommendation from the GSA, Trump transition team members discuss installing Signal, an encrypted messaging app, on Flynn's phone to encrypt his communications.
- December 1: According to an anonymous letter to The Washington Post citing leaked intercepts of Russian diplomatic communications, during a transition team meeting at Trump Tower, Kushner asks Kislyak about the potential to communicate directly with the Kremlin over a Russian-encrypted channel. Flynn also attends the meeting.
- December 22: At the direction of a "very senior member" of the transition team, Flynn asks Kislyak to delay or defeat a pending vote on a United Nations Security Council resolution. Flynn later pleads guilty to lying to the FBI about the effort to defeat the resolution.
- December 23: Kislyak calls Flynn and tells him Russia will not vote against the United Nations Security Council resolution they spoke about the day before.
- December 28: Kislyak texts Flynn and asks him to call, setting off the series of calls in the following days.
- December 29:
  - Following Executive Order 13757 signed the previous day, Obama's administration expels 35 Russian diplomats, locks down two Russian diplomatic compounds, and expands sanctions against Russia. Flynn consults with the Trump transition team, then speaks with Kislyak by telephone to request that Russia not escalate matters in response to Obama's actions. Flynn later pleads guilty to lying to the FBI about his conversations with Kislyak regarding the new sanctions.
  - Before Flynn's call to Kislyak, K. T. McFarland emails other Trump transition officials saying that Flynn will be speaking to Kislyak to try to prevent a cycle of retaliation over the newly imposed sanctions. The email is forwarded to Flynn, Reince Priebus, Bannon, and Sean Spicer.
- December 31: Kislyak calls Flynn to tell him that Russia has decided not to retaliate based upon Flynn's request. Afterward, Flynn tells senior members of the transition team about his conversations with Kislyak and Russia's decision not to escalate.

2017

- January:
  - McGahn researches the Logan Act and federal laws related to lying to federal investigators. Records turned over to the Mueller investigation show McGahn believes Flynn violated one or more of those laws.
  - For two days in early January, in a gathering George Nader attends and brokers, Joel Zamel and General Ahmed Al-Assiri meet with Michael Flynn and other members of the Trump transition team in New York. Bannon was also involved. In October 2018, the meeting comes under the Mueller investigation's scrutiny.
- January 4: The FBI begins investigating Flynn's December phone calls with Kislyak.
- January 5: Flynn, Kushner and Bannon meet with the King of Jordan. According to BuzzFeed, they discuss a plan to deploy American nuclear power plants in Jordan with security support from a Russian company. "People close to the three Trump advisers" deny the allegations.
- January 10: In a confirmation hearing before the Senate Judiciary Committee, Sessions denies communicating with the Russian government during Trump's election campaign.
- January 13:
  - Sean Spicer claims in a press conference that Flynn had only one call with Kislyak, about setting up a call between Trump and Putin. Emails from December show Spicer most likely knew Flynn discussed sanctions with Kislyak on December 29, 2016, and may have known about the purpose of the call in advance.
  - K.T. McFarland insists to a reporter at The Washington Post that Flynn and Kislyak did not discuss sanctions and only spoke with each other prior to December 29. The statement contradicts emails between herself and Flynn.
- January 15: Interviewed on CBS's Face the Nation and Fox News Sunday, Vice President-elect Pence repeatedly denies any connection between the Trump campaign team and Russians. He also denies Flynn discussed sanctions with Kislyak.
- January 17: Sessions states in writing that he has not been "in contact with anyone connected to any part of the Russian government about the 2016 election." Sessions had been accused of failing to disclose two meetings with Kislyak.
- January 18: The Daily Sabah reports a breakfast event occurred at the Trump International Hotel Washington, D.C., with about 60 invitees, including Nunes, Flynn, and foreign officials. The Daily Beast reports in January 2019 Mueller is investigating whether foreigners contributed money to the Trump inaugural fund and PAC through American intermediaries.

== Steele dossier ==
2015

- September–October: The Washington Free Beacon, a conservative website primarily funded by billionaire Paul Singer, hires Fusion GPS to perform opposition research on Trump. Initially a Marco Rubio supporter, Singer continues to fund the research after Rubio withdraws from the race.

2016

- April: Marc Elias, a lawyer at Perkins Coie and general counsel for the Clinton campaign, takes over funding of the Fusion GPS Trump investigation. He uses discretionary funds at his disposal and does not inform the campaign about the research.
- June: Glenn R. Simpson, director of Fusion GPS, hires Christopher Steele to research Trump's activities in Russia. A resultant 35-page document, later known as the Steele dossier or Trump–Russia dossier, is published on January 10, 2017, by BuzzFeed News.
- July 5: At his London office, Steele reveals to an FBI agent from Rome some of his findings that indicate a wide-ranging Russian conspiracy to elect Trump.
- July 19: Steele files a dossier memo alleging that during his Moscow trip, Page met Rosneft chairman Igor Sechin, and discussed the possible lifting of sanctions against Russia. In his congressional testimony, Page denies meeting with the Russians named in the dossier. He says he met Sechin's associate Andrey Baranov, but says "nothing that this gentleman said to me ever implied or asked for anything related to sanctions. Again, there may have been some general reference ... but no kind of negotiations in any format".
- September 19: Crossfire Hurricane investigators obtain the Steele dossier.
- Early October: A team of FBI agents travel to Europe to speak with Steele about his dossier. On or about the same date, Steele gives the FBI a dossier of allegations compiled by Cody Shearer, which corresponded "with what he had separately heard from his own independent sources." It includes the unverified allegation that Trump was sexually compromised by the Russian secret service at the Ritz-Carlton Hotel in Moscow in 2013.
- October 31: Mother Jones magazine's David Corn reports that a veteran spy, later publicly identified as Steele, gave the FBI information alleging a Russian operation to cultivate Trump, allegations which were contained in what later became known as the "Steele dossier".
- December 9: Republican Senator John McCain delivers the Steele dossier to Comey.
- December 10: Simpson tells Ohr that he believes Cohen was the "go-between from Russia to the Trump campaign", and gives him a memory stick containing evidence. Ohr memorializes the meeting in handwritten notes, according to which it was Simpson who asked Steele to pass information to David Corn of Mother Jones. Ohr writes this was "Glenn's Hail Mary attempt". Ohr also writes that "much of the collection about the Trump campaign ties to Russia comes from a former Russian intelligence officer (? not entirely clear) who lives in the U.S.".
- December 26: Oleg Erovinkin, a former KGB official, is found dead in the back seat of his car in Moscow. He was suspected of assisting Steele in compiling his dossier.

2017

- January 10: BuzzFeed publishes the Steele dossier alleging various misdeeds by Trump and associates in Russia. Trump dismisses the dossier as "fake news".
- January 11:
  - Trump tweets, "Russia has never tried to use leverage over me. I HAVE NOTHING TO DO WITH RUSSIA – NO DEALS, NO LOANS, NO NOTHING!". USA Today says this is "not exactly true".
  - BBC News's Paul Wood writes that the salacious information in Steele's dossier was also reported by "multiple intelligence sources" and "at least one East European intelligence service".
  - Michael Cohen tells Sean Hannity on talk radio that there is no relationship between Russia and the people around Trump or the Trump campaign.

== Intelligence intercepts, warnings and investigations ==
- 2012: The FBI warns Representative Dana Rohrabacher that he is being targeted by Russian agents to recruit him as an "agent of influence"; that is, someone who can affect US policy.
- Spring 2015: U.S. Intelligence intercepts conversations of Russian government officials discussing associates of Donald Trump.

2016

- April: The intelligence agency of a Baltic state shares a piece of intelligence with the director of the CIA regarding the Trump campaign. The intelligence is allegedly a recording of a conversation about Russian government money going to the Trump campaign. This event raises U.S. intelligence officials' suspicions of Russian meddling in the presidential election.
- End July: CIA Director John Brennan, alarmed at intelligence that Russia is trying to "hack" the election, forms a working group of officials from the CIA, FBI, and NSA.
- July 31: The FBI starts a counter-intelligence investigation into Russian interference, including possible coordination between Trump associates and Russia. The investigation is issued the code name "Crossfire Hurricane."
- August 4: Brennan calls his Russian counterpart Alexander Bortnikov, head of the FSB, to warn him against meddling in the presidential election.
- Late August: Brennan gives individual briefings to the Gang of Eight on links between the Trump campaign and Russian interference in the election.
- August 17: Trump is warned in an FBI briefing that foreign adversaries including Russia would likely attempt to infiltrate his campaign. This is Trump's first classified briefing. Clinton receives a similar briefing in the same month.
- Late August–Early September: According to December 2018 McClatchy DC reporting, Cohen's cellphone communicates with cell towers in the vicinity of Prague, and communication intercepts by an Eastern European intelligence agency overhear a Russian conversation that states Cohen is in Prague. If true, it would lend credence to the allegation in the Steele dossier that Cohen traveled to Prague to meet with Russians.
- September: The CIA gives a secret briefing to congressional leaders on Russian interference in the election. Senate Majority Leader Mitch McConnell voices doubts about the intelligence.
- September 2: Lisa Page writes in a text message to Peter Strzok that a meeting at the FBI was set up "because Obama wanted 'to know everything we are doing'." She was referring to the FBI investigation into Russian interference in the 2016 election, not the Clinton emails investigation, which had been concluded months earlier.
- September 22: Senator Dianne Feinstein and Representative Adam Schiff issue a statement warning that Russia is trying to undermine the election. Their warning is based on what they learned from intelligence briefings as members of the Gang of Eight.
- October 7: At 12:40 PM EDT, The DHS and the ODNI issue a joint statement accusing the Russian government of breaking into the computer systems of several political organizations and releasing the obtained material via DCLeaks, WikiLeaks, and "Guccifer 2.0", with the intent "to interfere with the U.S. election process."
- October 15: The National Security Division of the Justice Department acquires a FISA warrant to monitor the communications of two Russian banks as part of an investigation into whether they illegally transferred money to the Trump campaign.
- October 28: The FBI reopens its Hillary Clinton email investigation after a monthlong delay during which it focused on investigating the Trump campaign's connections to Russia, according to the report of the Justice Department's inspector general. A key influence on the decision was a probably fake Russian intelligence document discussing a purported email from Attorney General Loretta E. Lynch to Clinton campaign staffer Amanda Renteria in which she promises to go easy on Clinton. Nine days after announcing he was reopening the probe, Comey said the FBI found nothing to change its July decision against bringing charges.
- November–January: During the transition period, the FBI warns Trump aide Hope Hicks at least twice that she might be approached by Russian government operatives using fake identities.
- December 9: The Trump transition team dismisses reported intelligence assessments finding Russian interference in the election. Their statement says, "These are the same people that said Saddam Hussein had weapons of mass destruction. The election ended a long time ago in one of the biggest Electoral College victories in history. It's now time to move on and 'Make America Great Again.'"

2017

- Early January: At a meeting in CIA headquarters, a U.S. spy chief warns Mossad agents that Putin may have "leverages of pressure" over Trump, and that intelligence should be shared cautiously with the coming White House and National Security Council, for fear of leaks to the Russians and thereby Iran.
- January 5:
  - Obama is briefed on the intelligence community's findings.
  - U.S. intelligence agencies release a report concluding that Putin ordered the cyber-campaign to influence the 2016 election.
  - R. James Woolsey Jr., who became a senior adviser to Trump in September 2016, resigns amid Congressional hearings into cyber attacks and public statements by Trump critical of the United States Intelligence Community.
- January 6:
  - The Office of the Director of National Intelligence (ODNI) publishes an unclassified report about Russian meddling in the 2016 election stating that "Putin ordered an influence campaign in 2016 aimed at the US presidential election". While the report says Russian hackers did not change votes, it ignores the security of back-end election systems. Putin was personally involved in the Russian interference, per a CIA stream of intelligence.
  - Director of National Intelligence (DNI) James Clapper, CIA Director John Brennan, NSA Director Michael S. Rogers, and FBI Director James Comey travel to Trump Tower in New York City to brief Trump and senior members of the transition team on the classified version of the ODNI report on Russian interference in the election. They show Trump the intelligence behind their assessment, including human sources confirming Putin's role, and American, British, and Dutch intelligence services seeing stolen DNC documents in Russian military networks. In addition to Trump, the other people present are incoming White House Chief of Staff Reince Priebus, incoming CIA Director Mike Pompeo, incoming National Security Adviser Michael Flynn, and Vice President-elect Mike Pence. After the briefing, Comey stays behind to privately brief Trump on the salacious allegations in the Steele dossier. While cordial during the briefings, Trump still refuses to accept the intelligence on Russian interference. The meeting unsettles Comey and prompts him to write a memo documenting the conversation.
- January 13: The Senate Intelligence Committee announces it will investigate Russian cyberattacks, meddling in the election, and "intelligence regarding links between Russia and individuals associated with political campaigns."

== Trump's statements about Putin ==
Even before running for office, Trump had made a number of public comments about Russian President Vladimir Putin, usually praising his leadership style, or pretending he "got to know him very well" even though they had never met.

- October 15, 2007: In a Larry King Live interview, Trump praises Putin for "doing a great job" in "what he's doing with Russia".

2013

- June 15–18: Attending the Miss USA 2013 pageant, Trump dines with Aras Agalarov, Emin Agalarov, and Rob Goldstone in Las Vegas. The next day he announces that Miss Universe 2013 will be held in Moscow. He sends Putin a letter inviting him to the pageant and asks on Twitter whether the Russian president will be his "new best friend".
- October 17: In an appearance on the Late Show with David Letterman, Donald Trump says he has conducted "a lot of business with the Russians" and said of Putin "He's a tough guy. I met him once."

2014

- February 10: In a Fox and Friends phone interview, Trump says Putin contacted him while he was in Moscow for the Miss Universe pageant.
- March 6: Speaking at the Conservative Political Action Conference (CPAC), Trump says, "You know, I was in Moscow a couple of months ago, I own the Miss Universe Pageant and they treated me so great. Putin even sent me a present, a beautiful present."
- March 21: Trump posts two tweets praising Putin regarding "Russian Empire" on the day the Russian Federal Assembly ratifies the Treaty on Accession of the "Republic of Crimea", formalizing the annexation of Crimea by the Russian Federation.
- April 12: Asked about Putin by Eric Bolling on the Fox News show Cashin' In, Trump says Putin has taken the mantle from Obama. He continues, "Interestingly, I own the Miss Universe pageant, and we just left Moscow. He could not have been nicer. He was so nice and so everything. But you have to give him credit that what he's doing for that country in terms of their world prestige is very strong."
- May 27: Speaking at a National Press Club luncheon, Trump again claims to have spoken to Putin. "I own the Miss Universe [pageant]. I was in Russia. I was in Moscow recently. And I spoke indirectly and directly with President Putin who could not have been nicer. And we had a tremendous success."

2015

- June 17: In an interview on the Fox News show Hannity, Sean Hannity asks Trump if he has talked to Putin. Trump replies, "I don't want to say. But I got to meet all of the leaders. I got to meet all—I mean, everybody was there. It was a massive event. And let me tell you, it was tremendous."
- September 21: On Hugh Hewitt's radio program, Trump says, "The oligarchs are under [Putin's] control, to a large extent. I mean, he can destroy them, and he has destroyed some of them... Two years ago, I was in Moscow... I was with the top-level people, both oligarchs and generals, and top-of-the-government people. I can't go further than that, but I will tell you that I met the top people, and the relationship was extraordinary."
- November 10: At the Republican debate in Milwaukee, Trump claims that he met Putin in a green room and "got to know him very well" while waiting to record their 60 minutes interviews that aired on September 27. Fact checkers quickly point out that Trump and Putin could not have met in the green room because Trump was interviewed in New York City and Putin was interviewed in Moscow.

2016

- May 27: At a rally, Trump calls Putin "a strong leader."
- July 27: Trump tells a CBS affiliate in Miami, "I have nothing to do with Russia. Nothing to do. I never met Putin. I have nothing to do with Russia whatsoever." This contradicts his many claims since 2013 to have met Putin and done business in Russia.
- October 19: During the third presidential debate, Clinton blames Russia for the DNC email leaks and accuses Trump of being a "puppet" of Putin. Trump denies ever having met Putin and any connection to him.
- December 30: Putin announces he will not retaliate against the U.S. expulsions, contrary to recommendations from Lavrov. In reply, Trump tweets "Great move on delay (by V. Putin) – I always knew he was very smart!" This message is widely interpreted as praising Putin's actions.

== Other contact attempts by Russians towards the Trump campaign ==
2015

- August 17: Konstantin Rykov, the founder of the Russian online newspaper Vzglyad, registers two domain names: Trump2016.ru and DonaldTrump2016.ru.
- August 18: Georgi Asatryan of Vzglyad emails Hope Hicks to arrange an in-person or phone interview with Trump. According to the Mueller Report, the proposed interview never occurs.
- November 16: Lana Erchova (a.k.a. Lana E. Alexander) sends an email to Ivanka Trump in which she offers the services of her husband, Dmitry Klokov, to the Trump campaign. According to the Mueller Report, Klokov is the "Director of External Communications for PJSC Federal Grid Company of Unified Energy System, a large Russian electricity transmission company, and had been previously employed as an aide and press secretary to Russia's energy minister." Ivanka forwards the email to Cohen. At least until August 2018, Cohen mistakenly thinks Klokov is the Olympic weightlifter of the same name.
- November 18: Klokov writes in an email to Cohen that he is a "trusted person" offering "political synergy" and "synergy on a government level" to the Trump campaign. He suggests that Cohen travel to Moscow and meet with him and an intermediary. He says the conversations could facilitate an informal meeting between Trump and Putin, and that any such meeting must be separate from any business negotiations, though it would lead to high-level support for projects.
- December 21: On Russian Deputy Prime Minister Sergei Prikhodko's behalf, Mira Duma emails Ivanka Trump an invitation for Donald Trump to attend the St. Petersburg International Economic Forum. Duma is acquainted with Ivanka from the fashion industry.

2016

- January 7: Ivanka Trump forwards to Rhona Graff the December 21 invitation for her father she received from Duma on Prikhodko's behalf.
- January 14: Graff responds to Duma's December 21 email that Trump is "honored to be asked to participate in the highly prestigious" St. Petersburg Forum, but must decline the invitation because of his "very grueling and full travel schedule." Graff asks Duma if she should "send a formal note to the Deputy Prime Minister," and Duma replies that that would be "great."
- March 17: According to Trump's written answers to Mueller's team, Prikhodko sends another invitation for Trump to attend the St. Petersburg International Economic Forum to Rhona Graff.
- March 31:
  - Graff prepares a letter for Trump's signature that declines Prikhodko's March 17 invitation to St. Petersburg because of Trump's busy schedule, but says he otherwise "would have gladly given every consideration to attending such an important event."
  - New York investment banker Robert Foresman emails Graff seeking an in-person meeting with Trump. The email is sent after Trump business associate Mark Burnett brokers an introductory phone call. Foresman writes that he has long-standing personal and professional expertise in Russia and Ukraine, and mentions that he was involved with setting up an early private back channel between Putin and former president George W. Bush. He also writes about an "approach" he received from "senior Kremlin officials" about Trump. He asks Graff for a meeting with Trump, Lewandowski, or "another relevant person" to discuss the approach and other "concrete things" that he doesn't want to discuss over "unsecure email."
- April 4:
  - Graff emails her March 31 letter for Prikhodko to Jessica Macchia, another executive assistant to Trump, to print on letterhead for Trump to sign.
  - Graff forwards Foresman's March 31 email to Macchia.
- April 25: Foresman emails Graff to remind her of his March 31 email seeking a meeting with Trump, Lewandowski, or another appropriate person.
- April 27: Graff sends Foresman an apology and forwards his March 31 and April 26 emails to Lewandowski.
- April 30: Foresman sends Graff another email reminding her of his meeting requests on March 31 and April 26. He suggests an alternative meeting with Trump Jr. or Eric Trump so that he can tell them information that "should be conveyed to [the candidate] personally or [to] someone [the candidate] absolutely trusts".
- May 2: Graff forwards Foresman's April 30 email to Stephen Miller.
- May 15: David Klein, a distant relative of Trump Organization lawyer Jason Greenblatt, emails Clovis about a possible campaign meeting with Chief Rabbi of Russia Berel Lazar. Klein writes that he contacted Lazar in February about a possible meeting between Trump and Putin and that Lazar was "a very close confidante of Putin." Later Klein and Greenblatt meet with Lazar at Trump Tower.

== Donations from Russians and Ukrainians ==
2015

- September 11: Trump speaks at the Yalta European Strategy conference in Kyiv via satellite. The organizer of the event, Victor Pinchuk, donates $150,000 to Trump's charity, the Trump Foundation.

2016

- March 12: Russian-American Simon Kukes donates $2,700 to the Trump campaign. It is his first-ever political donation. In 2017, his 2016 political donations become a subject of the Mueller investigation.
- June 23: Kukes donates $100,000 to the Trump Victory fund. In 2017, his political donations become a subject of the Mueller investigation.
- July 13: Kukes donates $49,000 to the Trump Victory fund. In 2017, his 2016 political donations become a subject of the Mueller investigation.
- August 13: Kukes attends a $25,000-per-ticket Trump fundraising dinner at the home of Woody Johnson in New York. Kukes's 2016 political donations become a subject of the Mueller investigation.
- September 28: Kukes donates $99,000 to the Trump Victory Committee, which distributes donations between Trump, the RNC, and state Republican parties. His 2016 political donations become a subject of the Mueller investigation.

2017

- January 6: Vekselberg's cousin and Columbus Nova CEO Andrew Intrater donates $250,000 to the Trump inaugural fund. Intrater's previous political donations totaled less than $3,000 across all candidates.
- January 9: Cohen and Vekselberg meet at Trump Tower to discuss their mutual desire to improve Russia's relationship with the U.S. under the Trump administration. After Trump was inaugurated, Cohen received a $1 million consulting contract from Columbus Nova, headed by Andrew Intrater, who also attended the Vekselberg meeting.
- January 17: Leonard Blavatnik, Sergei Kislyak, and Russian-American president of IMG Artists Alexander Shustorovich attend the Chairman's Global Dinner, an invitation-only inaugural event. Other attendees include Michael Flynn, Manafort, Bannon, and Nix. Blavatnik and Shustorovich donated $1 million each to the Trump inaugural fund. Shustorovich is a longtime business partner of Vekselberg, and, nearly 20 years earlier, the Republican National Committee returned his six-figure donation because of his past ties to the Russian government.
- January 19:
  - Vekselberg and Intrater meet Cohen for a second time at the Candlelight Dinner, an event for $1 million donors to Trump's inaugural fund. They are seated together with Cohen's family. Days later, Columbus Nova awards Cohen a $1 million consulting contract.
  - Billionaire Blavatnik Kazakh oligarch Alexander Mashkevitch attend the Candlelight Dinner. They qualified for tickets to the event by donating $1 million each to the Trump inaugural fund.

== Brexit, Farage, Banks and Wigmore ==
Nigel Farage is a British politician who was leader of the UK Independence Party from 2006 to 2016 and a Member of the European Parliament since 1999. He has long advocated for the United Kingdom to leave the European Union, a project known as Brexit, on which the British people voted in June 2016. Arron Banks is a British financier who co-founder the pro-Brexit Leave.EU campaign and backed it financially. Andy Wigmore, a close associate of Banks, was director of communications for Leave.EU. Farage, Banks and Wigmore had several contacts with Trump and his presidential campaign; Farage was notably invited to speak at a Trump rally.

2016

- June 23: In the Brexit referendum, a majority of British citizens vote to leave the European Union.
- July 18–21: During the Republican convention, Farage encounters Stone and Alex Jones at a restaurant. The next day, Stone contacts Manafort and suggests a meeting between Trump and Farage. Manafort responds that he will pass on the request.
- July 21: Farage and Andy Wigmore encounter staffers for Mississippi Governor Phil Bryant at the bar in the Hilton Hotel. A staffer invites Wigmore and Farage to Mississippi.
- August 19: Arron Banks and Andy Wigmore meet with Alexander Yakovenko for lunch. They discuss their upcoming trip to Mississippi and the Trump campaign.
- August 25: Banks, Wigmore, and Farage attend a Trump fundraising dinner and participate in a Trump rally in the Mississippi Coliseum. Wigmore and Farage meet Trump for the first time at the dinner. At the rally, Trump introduces Farage to the crowd as "Mr. Brexit."
- October 9: Banks, Wigmore, and Farage attend the second presidential debate in St. Louis, Missouri.
- November 12: Banks, Farage and Wigmore visit Trump Tower unannounced and are invited inside by Bannon. They have a long meeting with Trump. Wigmore asks Trump's receptionist for the Trump transition team's contact information.
- November 15: Banks and Wigmore meet with Yakovenko in London; they discuss their November 12 meeting with Trump, and Sessions's role in the new administration. At Yakovenko's request, Banks provides Yakovenko with contact information for the Trump transition team.
- November 21: Trump calls for Nigel Farage to be made the U.K. Ambassador to the United States. The British government responds, "There is no vacancy."

2017

- January 8: Bloomberg reports that Ted Malloch was interviewed by the Trump transition team for the position of U.S. Ambassador to the European Union. Malloch was recommended for the position by Nigel Farage. In 2018, Malloch is served a search warrant by the FBI and questioned by Mueller.

== Before Donald Trump's candidacy ==
2000

- February 14: Trump withdraws his bid for the Reform Party nomination in the 2000 United States presidential election, but writes that he cannot rule out another run for president. Stone chaired Trump's exploratory committee.

2004

- November 22: The Orange Revolution begins, eventually resulting in a revote ordered by the Supreme Court of Ukraine.

2011

- 2011–2013: Protests occur in Russia against its legislative and presidential election processes. Putin accuses U.S. Secretary of State Hillary Clinton of interfering in Russian politics.
- December 8: Putin states that Clinton "set the tone for some opposition activists", and "gave them a signal, they heard this signal and started active work".

2012

- December 14: President Barack Obama signs the Magnitsky Act into law to punish Russian officials responsible for human rights violations.

2013

- November 21: Euromaidan starts when President Yanukovych suspends preparations for the implementation of an association agreement with the European Union.

2014

- March 6: Obama initiates international sanctions on certain Russian individuals, businesses and officials, in response to the Russian military intervention in Ukraine and the annexation of Crimea.
- July 22: Laurence Levy, a lawyer with the law firm Bracewell & Giuliani, advises Rebekah Mercer, Steve Bannon, and Alexander Nix on the legality of their company, Cambridge Analytica, being involved in U.S. elections. He advises that Nix and any foreign nationals without a green card working for the company not be involved in any decisions about work the company performs for any clients related to U.S. elections. He further advises Nix to recuse himself from any involvement with the company's U.S. election work because he is not a U.S. citizen.

January–June 2015

- 2015: Russian oligarch Vladimir Potanin's investment fund AltPoint Capital Partners purchases ByteGrid LLC, which operates some of Maryland's election systems. Potanin is described as "very close" to Putin. State officials are not informed of the purchase, and remain unaware until the FBI briefs them in July 2018.

== 2016 presidential campaign ==
- September 2015: Jill Stein speaks briefly with Russian Foreign Minister Sergey Lavrov at a Russia Today gala in New York City.

2016

- April:
  - Between April and November 2016, there are at least 18 further exchanges by telephone and email between Russian officials and the Trump team.
  - Russian social media company SocialPuncher releases an analysis showing that Trump has quoted or retweeted Twitter bots 150 times since the beginning of 2016.
- June 15: House Majority Leader Kevin McCarthy and House Speaker Paul Ryan meet separately with Ukrainian Prime Minister Volodymyr Groysman at the Capitol. Groysman describes to them how the Kremlin is financing populist politicians in Eastern Europe to damage democratic institutions. McCarthy and Ryan have a private meeting afterwards with GOP leaders that is secretly recorded. Toward the end of their conversation, after laughing at the DNC hacking, McCarthy says, "there's two people, I think, Putin pays: Rohrabacher and Trump...[laughter]...swear to God." Ryan then tells everyone to keep this conversation secret. A transcript of the recording becomes public a year later.
- July 18: Gordon lobbies to remove arms sales to Ukraine from the Republican platform, citing concerns over conflict escalation in Donbas. In December 2017, Diana Denman, a Republican delegate who supported the weapons sale, says that Trump directed Gordon to weaken that position.
- July 31: In an interview on This Week, Trump tells George Stephanopoulos that people in his campaign were responsible for changing the GOP's platform stance on Ukraine, but that he was not personally involved.
- August: With his lawyer, "Max" reveals data assembled to Eric Lichtblau of the New York Times.
- August 3: Trump Jr., George Nader, Erik Prince, Stephen Miller, and Joel Zamel meet at Trump Jr.'s office in Trump Tower. Nader relays an offer from the leaders of Saudi Arabia and the United Arab Emirates (U.A.E.) to help get Trump elected. Zamel pitches his Israeli company's services for a multimillion-dollar campaign to manipulate social media. It is not known whether the social media campaign occurred.
- August 26–27: Frederick Intrater registers several Internet domain names that are variations on the term "alt-right." The domain names are registered using his name and the name and contact information of his employer, private equity firm Columbus Nova. Intrater is the brother of Columbus Nova CEO Andrew Intrater and a cousin of Vekselberg. Columbus Nova is the American investment arm of Vekselberg's business empire.
- Late September: Lichtblau and his lawyer meet a roomful of officials at FBI HQ, and are told the officials are looking into potential Russian interference in the election. FBI officials ask Lichtblau to delay publishing his story.
- October 8: Kushner's company receives $370 million in new loans, including $285 million from Deutsche Bank, to refinance his portion of the former New York Times building. The size and timing of the Deutsche Bank loan draws scrutiny from the House Financial Services Committee, the Justice Department, and, later, the Mueller investigation. The concern is that the transaction may be related to Russian money laundering through Deutsche Bank.
- October 11: Trump Jr. travels to Paris to give a paid speech at the Ritz Hotel. The dinner event is sponsored by the Center of Political and Foreign Affairs, a group founded by Fabien Baussart and his business partner. Baussart is openly linked to Russian government officials. Randa Kassis, one of the hosts, travels to Moscow after the election and reports the details of the event to Russian Deputy Foreign Minister Mikhail Bogdanov.
- October 19: A Financial Times probe finds evidence a Trump venture has links to alleged laundering network.
- October 24: Trump announces at a Florida campaign rally, "I have nothing to do with Russia, folks. I'll give you a written statement."
- October 27: At the Valdai Discussion Club yearly forum, Putin denounces American "hysteria" over accusations of Russian interference, saying "Does anyone seriously think that Russia can influence the choice of the American people?"

Senator Harry Reid Letter to FBI Director James B. Comey

- October 30: Senate Minority Leader Harry Reid sends FBI Director James Comey a letter asking him to reveal Trump's ties to the Russian Federation.
- October 31:
  - Through the "red phone", Obama tells Putin to stop interfering or face consequences.
  - The New York Times publishes an article by Lichtblau and Steven Lee Myers with a headline that seems to exonerate the Trump campaign, but withholds some information.

== Post-election transition ==
2016

- November 2016 – January 2017: The British Foreign Office holds a series of meetings with Cambridge Analytica executives in London, Washington, and New York to "better understand" how Trump won and acquire insights into the "political environment" following his win.
- November 8: Rospatent, the Russian government agency responsible for intellectual property, grants 10-year extensions on four of Trump's trademarks.
- November 10:
  - Kislyak states that Russia was not involved with U.S. election hacking.
  - Russian Deputy Foreign Minister Sergei Ryabkov tells the Interfax news agency "there were contacts" with the Trump team during the campaign.
  - Russian Foreign Ministry spokeswoman Maria Zakharova tells Bloomberg News that it was "normal practice" for Russian Embassy staffers to meet with members of the Trump campaign. She says the Clinton campaign declined requests for meetings.
  - Mark Zuckerberg calls the idea that "fake news" on Facebook could have influenced the election "crazy."
- November 11:
  - Hicks denies claims by the Kremlin that Trump officials met with its staff.
  - House Intelligence Committee Chairman Devin Nunes is named to the executive committee of the Trump transition team.
- November 13: Zakharova jokingly comments on the Rossiya 1 show Sunday Evening with Vladimir Solovyov that "our people in Brighton Beach won the election for Donald Trump."
- November 15: Devin Nunes replaces former Representative Mike Rogers as a Trump transition team national security advisor.
- November 19: Obama privately meets Mark Zuckerberg at a gathering of world leaders in Lima, Peru. Obama urges Zuckerberg to take the threats of political disinformation and "fake news" seriously, and warns him that doing nothing will cause problems in the next election. Zuckerberg responds that there were only a few messages, and doing something about the problem would be difficult.
- November 25: Trump announces K. T. McFarland will be the deputy national security advisor for his new administration after Paul Erickson lobbies former campaign officials and Trump donors to get her the position.
- December: Concerned that the incoming Trump administration may suppress the information collected in the Russia investigation, the White House spreads it across government agencies to leave a trail for future investigators.
- Early December: In Russia, FSB cyber chief Sergei Mikhailov, senior Kaspersky Lab researcher Ruslan Stoyanov, and hacker Dmitry Dokuchayev (known as "Forb") are arrested for treason.
- December 12: Kislyak meets with Kushner's assistant, Avi Berkowitz, to arrange a meeting between Kushner and the FSB-connected Sergey Gorkov, head of sanctioned Russian bank Vnesheconombank.
- December 13:
  - Gorkov arrives from Moscow to secretly meet Kushner in New York, before flying to Japan, where Putin is holding a summit. The meeting is first reported in March 2017, and attracts the interest of federal and congressional investigators in May. Kushner later characterizes the meeting as brief and meaningless. The White House later describes the meeting as a diplomatic encounter. The bank later says they discussed Kushner's real estate business.
  - Trump picks Rex Tillerson as Secretary of State; Russian officials praise the decision.
- December 15: Clinton tells a group of donors in Manhattan that Russian hacking was ordered by Putin "because he has a personal beef against me" due to her accusation in 2011 that Russian parliamentary elections that year were rigged. Clinton's comment is backed by U.S. Intelligence reports.
- December 16: Speaking at his final press conference as president, Obama comes just short of saying Putin was personally behind the DNC and Podesta hacks.
- December 18: Speaking to CBS News, Conway says it is "false" and "dangerous" to suggest that members of the Trump campaign spoke to any Russians during the campaign.

2017

- January 9: Kushner is named Senior Advisor to the President.
- January 13: President-elect Trump nominates U.S. Attorney Rod J. Rosenstein as Deputy Attorney General.
- January 18: Jared Kushner files his security clearance application without listing his meetings with Russians.
- January 20: Obama leaves office. See Timeline of the presidency of Donald Trump.

== See also ==
=== Investigations' continuing timelines ===
- Timeline of investigations into Trump and Russia (January–June 2017)
- Timeline of investigations into Trump and Russia (January–June 2018)
- Timeline of investigations into Trump and Russia (July–December 2018)
- Timeline of investigations into Trump and Russia (2019–2020)

=== Related continuing interference ===
- Russian interference in the 2018 United States elections
- Russian interference in the 2020 United States elections

=== Other related articles ===
- Assessing Russian Activities and Intentions in Recent US Elections intelligence report
- Business projects of Donald Trump in Russia § Timeline of Trump businesses related to Russia
- Cyberwarfare by Russia
- Donald Trump's disclosure of classified information to Russia
- Efforts to impeach Donald Trump
- Foreign electoral intervention
- Propaganda in the Russian Federation
- Russian espionage in the United States
- Russian interference in the 2016 Brexit referendum
- Social media in the 2016 United States presidential election
- Timelines related to Donald Trump and Russian interference in United States elections
