= Sam Patten =

American political consultant (born 1971)

Personal details
- Born: July 22, 1971 (age 53); Maine, U.S.
- Political party: Republican
- Relatives: Susan Mary Alsop (paternal grandmother)
- Education: Georgetown University (BA)
- Occupation: Political consultant

W. Samuel Patten is an American political consultant, lobbyist and author. Initially starting his career in Maine, he would go on to advise high-profile political figures worldwide.

He received particular international attention in 2018 in relation to the Special Counsel investigation led by former FBI director Robert Mueller. He ultimately took a plea deal and was sentenced for failing to register as a foreign agent with the Justice Department when he represented the Opposition Bloc, a Ukrainian political party, from 2014 through 2018.

== Early life and family ==
Patten was born, raised and currently resides in Maine. His father is Bill Patten Jr., whose mother was the Washington, D.C. socialite Susan Mary Alsop and whose father was later alleged to have been the British politician Duff Cooper, with whom his mother had an affair. His father published a small-town weekly newspaper in Camden, Maine and became a prison minister.

Patten graduated Georgetown University in Washington, D.C., in 1993. While at Georgetown, he became close to his grandmother Susan Mary Alsop, and was once wounded while defending her from muggers.

Patten married in 2013.

== Career ==
Patten began his political career in Maine as an intern for Senator William Cohen and as press secretary for Susan Collins during her campaigns for Governor (1994) and Senator (1996).

In the mid-to-late 1990s, Patten did public affairs work for the Kazakhstan oil sector.

In 1999 he worked for Senators Collins and Olympia Snowe in Washington, D.C. He was the Maine campaign director for the George W. Bush presidential campaign in 2000. From 2001 to 2004 Patten headed the Moscow office of the International Republican Institute; while there he worked with Konstantin Kilimnik, who later moved to Kyiv to work for Paul Manafort's consulting business in Ukraine. Patten worked for the U.S. State Department in 2008. In 2012, he advised Rob Sobhani on his U.S. Senate campaign in Maryland.

Around 2012, he was reportedly paid $30,000 per month by Bidzina Ivanishvili and a firm related to him. In 2014, Patten reportedly was receiving $20,000 per month from Iraqi Deputy Prime Minister Saleh al-Mutlaq and the Al-Arabiya Coalition, to support al-Mutlaq's run for prime minister.

In 2014, Patten was a senior consultant for SCL Group, the parent company of Cambridge Analytica, working at their Oregon office to help them fine-tune their models for the 2014 U.S. mid-term elections. He also helped SCL Group with their work on the 2015 Nigeria elections, including allegedly hiring Israeli hackers to find kompromat on presidential candidate Muhammadu Buhari.

Patten and Kilimnik founded Begemot Ventures International (BVI) in February 2015. Based in Washington, D.C., BVI is "a strategic and political advisory firm" that Patten claims only has clients outside the United States.

== FARA violation ==
Samuel Patten statement of the offense

Samuel Patten plea agreement

In August 2018, Patten was charged with violating the Foreign Agents Registration Act for failing to register as a foreign agent with the Justice Department when he represented the Opposition Bloc, a Ukrainian political party, from 2014 through 2018. In the statement of the offense, Kilimnik is identified as "Foreigner A", Begemot Ventures International as "Company A", and Serhiy Lyovochkin as "Foreigner B".

The prosecution against Patten was an outgrowth of work by the Special Counsel investigation, which referred the matter to the U.S. Attorney's Office for the District of Columbia and the Criminal Division of the Justice Department, which handled the prosecution. Additionally, after Patten was interviewed by Senate Intelligence Committee staff, "the Committee made a criminal referral to the Department of Justice" because of "concerns about certain statements made by Mr. Patten." In his subsequent guilty plea, Patten admitted to lying to the Intelligence Committee, although the crime to which Patten admitted guilt did not relate directly to his statements to the committee.

As part of his guilty plea, Patten admitted that he laundered a $50,000 contribution from Kilimnik to the 2017 Trump inauguration committee, by having the money transferred from a Cypriot bank to his company and from there to an unnamed American who sent it to the committee. According to the charge, Patten knew that it was illegal for a foreign national to give money to the committee. He also admitted that he lied to a Congressional committee about the inauguration donation and about his foreign lobbying work, and that he intentionally destroyed documents about that work.

On April 12, 2019, Patten was sentenced to three years' probation, 500 hours of community service and a $5000 fine.

Patten detailed his experiences in his 2023 book 'Dangerous Company: The Misadventures of a Foreign Agent'.

== See also ==
- Mueller Report
- Russian interference in the 2016 United States elections
