= Timeline of investigations into Donald Trump and Russia (January–June 2018) =

This is a timeline of major events in first half of 2018 related to the investigations into links between associates of Donald Trump and Russian officials that are suspected of being inappropriate, relating to Russian interference in the 2016 United States elections. It follows the timeline of Russian interference in the 2016 United States elections before and after July 2016 up until election day November 8, the transition, and the first and second halves of 2017, but precedes the second half of 2018, the first and second halves of 2019, 2020, and 2021. These events are related to, but distinct from, Russian interference in the 2018 United States elections.

== January–June 2018 ==
=== January ===
- January:
  - Federal agents photograph Maria Butina dining with Oleg Zhiganov, the director of the Russian Cultural Center. Zhiganov is expelled from the U.S. in March for being a suspected Russian spy. In a July hearing, prosecutors offer Butina's association with Zhiganov as one reason she should be considered a flight risk and denied bail.
  - Manafort tells Gates that Trump's personal counsel told him that they should "sit tight" and they are "going to take care of us." Gates presses him on whether pardons were mentioned, and he responds that the word wasn't used. In October, Manafort tells Mueller's team that he didn't tell Gates he talked to Trump's personal counsel or suggest they would be taken care of.
- January 2: In a New York Times op-ed, Fusion GPS founders Glenn Simpson and Peter Fritsch request that congressional Republicans "release full transcripts of our firm's testimony" and add that "the Steele dossier was not the trigger for the FBI's investigation into Russian meddling." Their sources said the dossier was taken seriously because it corroborated reports from other sources, "including one inside the Trump camp."
- January 3:
  - Manafort files a lawsuit challenging Mueller's broad authority and alleging the DoJ violated the law in appointing Mueller. A department spokesperson replies that "the lawsuit is frivolous but the defendant is entitled to file whatever he wants."
  - CNN reports that Trump's legal team held talks with Mueller's team a few days before Christmas.
  - Rosenstein and Wray meet with Ryan about the House Russia investigation.
  - Excerpts from Fire and Fury, a forthcoming book by Michael Wolff, are published, in which Bannon describes Trump Jr's meeting with Natalia Veselnitskaya as "treasonous" and "unpatriotic". Wolff's book also describes Bannon's confidence that Trump Sr. knew of the meeting at the time. Trump subsequently tweets that Bannon had "very little to do with our historic victory" and that he has "lost his mind".
  - Trump lawyers send Bannon a letter demanding that he refrain from making disparaging comments against Trump and his family.
- January 4:
  - The New York Times reports that two days after Comey's congressional testimony, an aide to Sessions approached a Capitol Hill staff member to ask for any derogatory information about Comey. Sessions purportedly wanted one negative article about Comey per day in the news media.
  - Mueller has handwritten notes from Priebus that show that Trump talked to Priebus about how he had called Comey to urge him to say publicly that Trump was not under investigation.
  - CNN reports that The Trump Organization has provided Mueller and Congressional investigators with documents on a wide range of events, including conversations and meetings about Trump's real estate business.
  - A federal judge denies Fusion GPS's bid to prevent the House Intelligence Committee from obtaining the firm's bank records.
- January 5:
  - Grassley and Graham make the first criminal referral of the congressional investigations, recommending that the DoJ investigate Steele for potentially making false statements to the FBI "regarding his distribution of information contained in the dossier".
  - The Senate Intelligence Committee interviews Patten. Afterward, the committee makes a criminal referral for Patten making false statements, which he eventually pleads guilty to.
- January 6:
  - CNN reports that Spicer, Priebus and McGahn all tried to pressure Sessions not to recuse himself from the FBI's Russia investigation, which ultimately led to Rosenstein appointing Mueller as special counsel.
  - Mueller's team interviews Emin Agalarov's associate Roman Beniaminov.
- January 7: Senate Judiciary Committee members Richard Blumenthal (D-CT) and Sheldon Whitehouse (D-RI) write to Grassley, demanding the publication of the Fusion GPS testimony of August 22, 2017.
- January 8:
  - Mueller's team gives Trump's personal counsel a detailed list of topics for a possible interview with Trump.
  - Facebook informs the Senate Intelligence Committee that an internal investigation found that, starting in 2016, the GRU's Fancy Bear created fake personas used to disseminate information from DCLeaks.

Putin's Asymmetric Assault on Democracy in Russia and Europe: Implications for U.S. National Security

- January 9:
  - Feinstein unilaterally releases the transcript of the Fusion GPS testimony given to the Senate Judiciary Committee on August 22, 2017.
  - The Daily Beast reports that a senior National Security Council official proposed withdrawing some U.S. military forces from Eastern Europe as an overture to Putin during the Trump administration's early days.
  - Trump's personal attorney Cohen sues BuzzFeed and Fusion GPS for defamation over allegations about him in a dossier the news organization published that was commissioned in 2016 by Trump's political opponents.
  - FBI agents subpoena Bannon to appear before a grand jury.
  - Mueller's team interviews Jonathan Hawker, a public relations consultant at FTI Consulting, for the first of two times through June 9. Hawker worked with Davis Manafort International LLC on a public relations campaign for Yanukovych.
  - Mueller's team interviews Zalmay Khalilzad, a former U.S. ambassador to Afghanistan and Iraq who attended dinners arranged by CNI that included Sessions and Kislyak.
- January 10:
  - The Washington Post reports that Mueller has added a veteran cyber prosecutor, Ryan K. Dickey, to his team, filling what has long been a gap in expertise and potentially signaling a recent focus on computer crimes. Dickey was previously assigned to the DoJ Computer Crime and Intellectual Property Section.
  - The United States Senate Foreign Relations Committee releases a report, "Putin's Asymmetric Assault on Democracy in Russia and Europe: Implications for U.S. National Security."
  - In a refiling of a 2008 suit filed in the Cayman Islands, Deripaska sues Manafort and Gates in New York state court for over $25 million in damages. Deripaska alleges that Mueller's indictments of Manafort and Gates provide new information in the case.
  - Senator John McCain's former staffer David J. Kramer testifies behind closed doors for a second time before the House Intelligence Committee. His lawyer, Larry Robbins, spends 30 minutes accusing Nunes' staff of "conduct unbecoming of how attorneys treat one another," causing alarm among members of both parties. Kramer received the subpoena for the hearing on December 27, 2017, four days after his lawyer accused the committee of leaking information to Cohen's lawyer.
- January 11: Mueller's team interviews Flynn for the sixth of 11 times.
- January 12: Mueller's team interviews Kushner's assistant Avi Berkowitz for the first time.
- January 16: Bannon testifies to the House Intelligence Committee, and remains tight-lipped, citing executive privilege. He indicates he will not invoke privilege when he testifies before Mueller's grand jury. The next day, Axios reports that Bannon informed the Committee that he had had a discussion with Priebus, Spicer, and Corallo about the June 2016 Veselnitskaya meeting.
- January 17:
  - Lewandowski and Dearborn testify before the House Intelligence Committee's investigators.
  - BuzzFeed News reports that Mueller's team and Senate Intelligence Committee investigators are looking into hundreds of financial transactions flagged as suspicious between the Russian government and people in the United States.
  - Mueller's team interviews Jeff Sessions.
- January 18:
  - McClatchy reports that the FBI is investigating whether the Central Bank of Russia's deputy governor, Alexander Torshin, funneled money to the Trump campaign through the NRA.
  - The House Intelligence Committee releases the transcript of the Glenn Simpson testimony given on November 14, 2017. Schiff says the testimony contains "serious allegations that the Trump Organization may have engaged in money laundering with Russian nationals". Trump Organization's chief counsel Alan Garten calls the allegations "unsubstantiated" and "reckless", and says that Simpson was mainly referring to properties to which Trump licensed his name. Democratic committee member Jim Himes says that Simpson "did not provide evidence and I think that's an important point. He made allegations."
  - The Trump inaugural committee declines to comment when USA Today asks about its finances and whether it followed through on its September 2017 pledge to donate $3 million to the Red Cross, the Salvation Army, and Samaritan's Purse.
  - Mueller's team interviews Priebus for the second of three times.

Nunes Memo

- January 19:
  - German periodical Manager Magazin reports that Deutsche Bank has presented to Germany's financial authority, BaFin, evidence of "suspicious money transfers" by Kushner; this information is due to be handed to Mueller. Deutsche Bank denies the report on January 22 and announces that it is taking legal action.
  - House Republicans call for the release of a classified memo authored by Nunes alleging FISA abuses during the 2016 election. Nunes has repeatedly refused to share his concerns with the FBI, even after repeated requests by the bureau. The memo was primarily written by committee staffer Kash Patel who, unlike Nunes, read the underlying intelligence the memo is based upon.
  - Mueller's team interviews Flynn for the seventh of 11 times.
  - Mueller's team interviews Nader for the first of three times.
  - The Senate Intelligence Committee interviews Yared Tamene.
- January 20: Twitter announces that it will notify 677,775 US citizens that they followed or retweeted accounts linked to Russian propaganda during the election. Twitter also announces the discovery of a further 1,062 propagandist accounts linked to the Kremlin's Internet Research Agency, bringing the total to 3,814, as well as the discovery of a further 13,512 automated bot accounts based in Russia, bringing the total to 50,258. Twitter estimates that the bot accounts produced 2.12 million tweets, collectively receiving 454.7 million impressions in the first week after each posting. Twitter's analysis indicates that Russian bots retweeted Trump's account 470,000 times in the run-up to election day, and Clinton's account 48,000 times.
- January 22:
  - Russian media outlet Meduza, published exclusively by Buzzfeed News in English, details the inside battle for control of Kaspersky Lab, and the kidnapping of Eugene Kaspersky's son which led to a battle that was won by the side allied with Russian security services (FSB).
  - It is reported that Sessions, at Trump's urging, has been pressuring FBI Director Wray to fire Deputy Director McCabe, but that Wray threatened to resign if McCabe was removed.
  - Papadopoulos's fiancée, Simona Mangiante, tells The Washington Post that he "knows far more" than has been reported by news outlets so far.
  - CNN reports that Mueller's team and Papadopoulos's lawyers have delayed an upcoming check-in for his case, indicating that the investigation will stay active until at least springtime.
  - Mueller's team interviews Nader for the second of three times.
  - The Senate Intelligence Committee interviews former acting DNC chair Donna Brazile.
- January 23:
  - The New York Times reports that Mueller's team interviewed Sessions the previous week. He is the first serving Cabinet member known to have been interviewed in the course of the Russia investigation.
  - The Washington Post reports that top congressional Democrats call on Facebook and Twitter to urgently investigate and combat Russian bots and trolls.
  - The New York Times reports that Mueller's team interviewed Comey last year about the memos he took contemporaneously to Trump's potential obstruction of justice into the investigation of Flynn.
  - The Washington Post reports that Mueller is seeking to question Trump in the coming weeks about his decisions to fire Flynn and Comey, suggesting potential obstruction of justice and abuse of power charges.
  - The Washington Post reports that Trump, during an Oval Office meeting, asked McCabe whom he voted for in the presidential election.
  - CNN reports that Gates has quietly added a prominent white-collar attorney, Tom Green, to his defense team, signaling that Gates's approach to his not-guilty plea could be changing. This is seen as a sign that Gates may be negotiating with Mueller's team.
  - Mueller's team interviews Nader for the final of three times.

The US Justice Department warned that the public release of a classified memo alleging abuses in FBI surveillance tactics would be "extraordinarily reckless"

- January 24:
  - Trump publicly confirms that he is willing to testify under oath to Mueller.
  - Mueller's team interviews Center for the National Interest (CNI) board member Charles Boyd.
  - Mueller's team interviews Flynn for the eighth of 11 times
- January 25:
  - The Senate Judiciary Committee announces plans to release transcripts of its interviews with Trump Jr. and others who participated in the June 2016 Veselnitskaya meeting.
  - The Senate Intelligence Committee releases a document detailing 129 fake political event announcements promoted on Facebook by Russian agents during the election. The announcements are believed to have drawn the interest of 340,000 Facebook users. Facebook admits to the Senate that it recommended Russian propaganda to some users.
  - The New York Times and The Washington Post report that Trump ordered Mueller fired in June 2017, but backed off when McGahn threatened to quit. Trump reportedly also floated the idea of firing Rosenstein.
  - Dutch newspaper de Volkskrant reports that hackers from the Dutch intelligence service AIVD infiltrated the Russian hacker group Cozy Bear in 2014 and witnessed the attacks on the DNC and the State Department, relaying evidence to US intelligence agencies all the while.
  - The Daily Beast reports that Mueller's team had no interest in interviewing Bannon until they read Wolff's book Fire and Fury.
  - Mueller's team interviews Andrei Vladimirovich Rozov, the Chairman of LC. Expert Investment Company and a signatory of the 2015 letter of intent for the Trump Tower Moscow project.
  - Mueller's team interviews Dov Zakheim, a board member at CNI.
- January 26:
  - Trump dismisses the previous day's Times story that he ordered McGahn to fire Mueller as "Fake news, folks. Fake news. A typical New York Times fake story."
  - Trump's personal counsel calls McGahn's attorney asking that McGahn publicly deny the Times story that Trump asked McGahn to fire Mueller. McGahn's attorney responds that that part of the Times story is accurate, and that McGahn will not comply with the request. Afterward, Hicks informs Trump about the call. Trump then asks Sanders to call McGahn about the story. McGahn tells Sanders that no response is necessary because some of the story was accurate.
  - The Senate Intelligence Committee interviews Robby Mook.

January 29, 2018– HPSCI Meeting Transcript

- January 29:
  - Trump's lawyers acknowledge that the president "dictated" the misleading statement put out by his son about the 2016 Trump Tower meeting with Russians.
  - Mark Warner tells Politico that the Senate Intelligence Committee late last year received "extraordinarily important new documents" in its investigation.
  - McCabe steps down as Deputy Director of the FBI, telling friends he felt pressured to leave by Wray.
  - Republicans on the House Intelligence Committee, disregarding DoJ warnings that their actions would be "extraordinarily reckless," vote on party lines to release the Nunes memorandum. During the committee meeting, Nunes refuses to answer direct questions from Representative Mike Quigley about whether his staffers communicated with the White House while writing the memo.
  - The Trump administration declines to impose additional sanctions on Russia as mandated under the Countering America's Adversaries Through Sanctions Act (CAATSA), which was designed to punish Moscow's alleged meddling, insisting the measure was already hitting Russian companies.
  - Trump's legal team sends Mueller a letter asserting that it is not illegal for the President to obstruct justice because the Constitution gives him the power to, "if he wished, terminate the inquiry, or even exercise his power to pardon."
  - Mueller's team interviews Gates.
- January 30:
  - In a last-minute reversal from their January 29 position, the Trump administration releases an updated list of Russian politicians and business figures in an attempt to increase pressure on Putin. The list includes 114 individuals the Treasury Department deems to be senior Russian political figures. It also includes 96 people deemed to be "oligarchs." The Treasury says each has an estimated net worth of $1 billion or more.
  - The Guardian reports on the existence of a dossier compiled by political activist and former journalist Cody Shearer and handed over to the FBI by Christopher Steele in October 2016 that independently makes many of the same allegations as the Steele dossier. The Guardian states that the FBI is still assessing Shearer's claims and following leads.
  - The Wall Street Journal reports that Mueller is seeking an interview with Mark Corallo, the former spokesman for Trump's legal team.
  - Mueller's team interviews Gates.
  - Mueller's team interviews former International Republican Institute employee Mark Lenzi.
  - Mueller's team interviews Sessions's legislative director, Sandra Luff.

Schiff accusing Nunes of making material changes to memo after committee vote

- January 31:
  - ABC News reports that the DoJ handed over numerous documents related to the proposed resignation of Sessions. The report also states that the White House handed over emails relating to Flynn's dismissal.
  - Bloomberg reports that Wray informed the White House that the Nunes memo "paints a false narrative."
  - CNN reports that Rosenstein visited the White House in December, seeking Trump's help in fighting off document demands from Nunes. Trump wanted to know where Mueller's Russia investigation was heading, and whether Rosenstein was "on my team".
  - In a Washington Post op-ed, Schiff blasts Nunes's actions.
  - US ambassador to Russia Jon Huntsman says Pompeo recently met with his Russian counterparts when they traveled to the US. Russian media reports that those who met with Pompeo may have included the country's sanctioned spy chief, Sergey Naryshkin.
  - In FEC filings, combined with the RNC, Trump's campaign reports paying a total of $5.5 million in legal bills during 2017 amid probes into Russia's role in the 2016 election.
  - Schiff releases a statement; "BREAKING: Discovered late tonight that Chairman Nunes made material changes to the memo he sent to White House – changes not approved by the Committee. White House therefore reviewing a document the Committee has not approved for release."
  - Mueller's team interviews Dana Boente.
  - Mueller's team interviews Gates.

=== February ===
- February: FBI agents assisting Mueller travel to Israel to interview employees of Psy-Group, the company whose founder, Joel Zamel, pitched psychological operations to the Trump campaign in 2016. Mueller also subpoenas records for payments made to PSY Group's bank account in Cyprus.
- Mueller's team interviews pollster Tony Fabrizio.
- February 1:
  - Three attorneys file motions in the United States District Court for the District of Columbia (D.D.C.) to withdraw their representation of Gates. One of them, Walter Mack, says in court that last month Mueller's prosecutors had warned him of more impending charges against Gates. Attorneys from the firm of Gates's new counsel, Tom Green, are seen entering the building where Mueller works.
  - Mueller's team interviews The National Interest editor Jacob Heilbrunn.
  - Mueller's team interviews John Hunt, the former chief of staff to Attorney General Sessions.
- February 2:
  Richard Pinedo statement of the offense
  - Trump declassifies the Nunes memo, which is publicly released by House Republicans.
  - The Patriot Legal Expense Fund Trust is established to help defray the legal costs of Trump campaign aides, transition aides, and White House aides questioned by Mueller's team and the House and Senate Intelligence Committees. The fund is not available to Trump, his family, or anyone tied to "any charge or indictment for dishonest, fraudulent or criminal activity" unless "the acts forming the basis of such charge or indictment were undertaken by the Recipient on behalf of, or directly in support of, the Campaign, the Transition or the Administration in good faith and without knowledge that such acts were prohibited by law."
  - Californian Richard Pinedo pleads guilty to one count of identity fraud arising from the Russia investigation, after allegedly selling stolen bank account information to individuals suspected of interfering in the election through Auction Essistance, an online marketplace. The plea agreement is kept secret until announced publicly on February 16. In the statement of the offense, PayPal is identified as "Company 1".
  - Mueller's team interviews Gates.
- February 3:
  - Trump tweets that the released Nunes memo "totally vindicates" him in the ongoing investigation.
  - U.S. District Judge James E. Boasberg sides with the DoJ, to avoid releasing "sensitive nonpublic information", after multiple news organizations sued for the public release of Comey's memos after their Freedom of Information Act requests were denied.
- February 4: Priebus tells Chuck Todd on Meet the Press that he never heard Trump say that he wanted Mueller fired. Afterward, Trump tells Priebus he did a great job, and that Trump "never said any of those things about" Mueller.
- February 5:
  - The United States House Permanent Select Committee on Intelligence votes unanimously to declassify the Democratic rebuttal to the Nunes memo. Prior to the vote, Nunes refuses to give details to the other committee members of his investigation into the Justice Department and the FBI.
  - Nunes admits that the FBI had indeed disclosed political backing for the Steele dossier in its October 19, 2016, FISA warrant application, which the Nunes memo, released on February 2, had denied.
  - The New York Times reports that Trump's lawyers have advised him to refuse a wide-ranging interview with Mueller. Mueller would be able to subpoena and compel Trump to testify before Mueller's Washington, D.C., grand jury.
  - Bannon refuses to appear before the House Intelligence Committee, risking a charge of contempt of Congress.
  - On Fox & Friends, Devin Nunes asserts that Papadopoulos never met Trump. In March 2016 The Trump campaign released photographic evidence of Papadopoulos and Trump in a meeting.
  - Trump complains to White House staff secretary Rob Porter that the January 25 New York Times article is "bullshit" and that McGahn leaked the story to the media. He orders Porter to tell McGahn to write a letter "for our records" stating that he never ordered McGahn to fire Mueller. He tells Porter, "If he doesn't write a letter, then maybe I'll have to get rid of him." Later that day, Porter delivers the message to McGahn, who refuses to write the letter because, he says, the article was accurate. Porter tells Kelly about his conversation with McGahn, and Trump never mentions the letter to him again.
  - The Senate Intelligence Committee interviews Trump campaign policy director John Mashburn.
- February 6:
  - The House Intelligence Committee gives Bannon one more week to comply with a subpoena to appear before the committee after missing an earlier deadline.
  - McGahn meets with Trump and Kelly in the Oval Office to discuss the Times article. Trump tells McGahn that the story needs to be corrected because it did not "look good." He says, "I never said to fire Mueller. I never said 'fire.' This story doesn't look good. You need to correct this. You're the White House counsel." When McGahn reiterates from the meeting notes what Trump previously told him, Trump replies that he didn't remember saying it in that way. Trump asks McGahn why he told Mueller's team about the conversation, and he replies that their conversations are not covered by attorney client privilege. Trump then castigates McGahn for taking notes, saying, "I've had a lot of great lawyers, like Roy Cohn. He did not take notes."
  - Trump's personal counsel submits legal arguments to Mueller's team asserting that Trump's actions are not covered by obstruction of justice statutes. In 2019, the team's analysis in the Mueller Report rejects the arguments as inconsistent with DoJ policy.
  - BuzzFeed News reports Tow Center for Digital Journalism director Jonathan Albright's analysis of IRA activity on Tumblr, which began in 2015. He finds the IRA's posts were primarily aimed at young African Americans and promoted anti-Clinton and pro-Sanders views.
- February 7:
  - Secretary of State Rex Tillerson suggests in an interview with Fox News that Russia is already attempting to interfere in the 2018 midterm elections, and the United States has not prepared itself to counter the threat.
  - Jeanette Manfra, the head of DHS National Protection and Programs Directorate, confirms that, as first reported in September 2016, Russian hackers targeted voter rolls in 21 states and penetrated "an exceptionally small number of them".
  - The Senate Intelligence Committee interviews Schiller.
  - Mueller's team interviews Gates.

The White House declines to publish the Democratic rebuttal to the Nunes memo.

Russian troll farm, 13 suspects indicted for interference in U.S. election

Manafort/Gates Eastern District of Virginia superseding indictment

Deputy Attorney General Rod Rosenstein announces indictments of thirteen Russian individuals and three Russian companies

- February 8:
  - Russian opposition leader Alexei Navalny posts a 25-minute video on YouTube alleging that Manafort sent information to the Kremlin through the oligarch Oleg Deripaska. The video includes footage taken from the Instagram account of sex worker Anastasia Vashukevich, better known as Nastya Rybka, showing Deripaska with Deputy Prime Minister Sergei Prikhodko on his yacht in August 2016.
  - Mueller's team interviews Rick Davis.
  - Mueller's team interviews Goldstone for the second of two times since August 29, 2017.
  - Mueller's team interviews White House communications advisor Josh Raffel.
- February 9:
  - The White House declines to publish the Democratic rebuttal to the Nunes memo. Although the document had been submitted to the DoJ and FBI for vetting before the House Intelligence Committee voted to release it, McGahn said in a letter to the committee that it "contains numerous properly classified and especially sensitive passages."
  - Mueller's team interviews Richard Burt.
  - The Senate Intelligence Committee interviews Clinton campaign communications director Jennifer Palmieri.
- February 12:
  - Senator Ron Wyden (D-OR), ranking member on the Senate Finance Committee, asks the Treasury Department for documentation related to Trump's 2008 sale of an uninhabitable Palm Beach mansion to Russian oligarch Dmitry Rybolovlev.
  - Foreign Policy reports that FTI Consulting has had investigators "traveling the globe" for the past six months trying to verify parts of the Steele dossier. BuzzFeed hired FTI Consulting to help in their defense against the libel suit filed by Aleksej Gubarev in February 2017.
  - Russia threatens to block YouTube and Instagram if they do not take down videos and photos related to Deripaska that were posted by Navalny and Vashukevich. (see Media freedom in Russia)
  - Mueller's team interviews Bannon for the first time.
  - Mueller's team interviews Gates.
- February 12–21: Manafort hires pollsters he worked with in the past to conduct polling in Ukraine on the proposed peace plan. Manafort sends the pollsters a three-page primer on the plan and works with Kilimnik to formulate the polling questions. The primer calls for Trump to support the "Autonomous Republic of Donbas" with Yanukovych as Prime Minister. Some of the polling questions ask for opinions on Yanukovich and his role in resolving the conflict in Donbas, as well as questions pertaining to the 2019 Ukrainian presidential election.
- February 13:
  - In testimony to the Senate Intelligence Committee, the heads of the U.S. intelligence community, including Pompeo, Wray, Rogers and Coats, say that Russia is intent on disrupting foreign elections, including the 2018 midterms.
  - BuzzFeed sues the DNC to get information it believes will help it defend itself in the libel suit Gubarev filed against it in federal court in February 2017. BuzzFeed believes the DNC has information linking Gubarev to the hacking of DNC email servers in 2016.
- February 14:
  - Mueller's team interviews Bannon for the second time.
  - The Senate Intelligence Committee interviews McCabe.
- February 15:
  - NBC News reports that Mueller's investigators have interviewed Bannon for a total of about 20 hours. The Associated Press adds that Bannon answered every question from Mueller's team.
  - Bannon appears at the House Intelligence Committee under subpoena. According to committee members, he answers only 25 questions that were pre-approved by the White House, answering "no" to each, and invokes presidential executive privilege to decline answering further questions. Republican and Democratic members of the committee say they are considering seeking contempt of Congress charges.
  - The Daily Beast reports that the Senate Intelligence Committee interviewed numerous former State Department staffers, including Assistant Secretary of State for Democracy, Human Rights, and Labor Tom Malinowski, Assistant Secretary of State for European and Eurasian Affairs Victoria Nuland, and Secretary of State John Kerry's chief of staff Jon Finer, about Russian efforts to meddle in the 2016 election.
  - Mueller's team interviews Corallo.
  - Mueller's team interviews an individual identified as P. Sanders. Sanders was a participant in the March 14, 2016, lunch hosted by CNI.
  - Mueller's team interviews Paul J. Saunders, the executive director of CNI.
  - The Senate Intelligence Committee interviews Trump Organization corporate IT director Jae Cho.
  - Mueller's team interviews Gates.
- February 16:
  - The Daily Beast reports that Mueller has interviewed Corallo for over two hours.
  - Mueller indicts 13 Russian citizens, IRA/Glavset and two other Russian entities in a 37-page indictment returned by a federal grand jury in the District of Columbia.
  - Pinedo's plea agreement is publicly announced as pleading guilty to identity fraud for selling bank account numbers to Russians involved in election interference.
  - The Senate Intelligence Committee interviews Rhona Graff.
- February 17: During questioning at the Munich Security Conference, Russian foreign minister Sergei Lavrov dismisses additional charges in the investigation as "just blather".
- February 18:
  - The Los Angeles Times reports that Gates will plead guilty to fraud-related charges, and that he has agreed to testify against Manafort for a reduced sentence.
  - In contrast to Lavrov, H. R. McMaster tells the Munich Security Conference that the evidence indicting the Russian officials shows Russian interference is "now incontrovertible".
- February 20:
  Alex van der Zwaan statement of the offense
  Alex van der Zwaan, a London-based attorney formerly with Skadden, Arps, Slate, Meagher & Flom, pleads guilty to one count of lying to federal investigators about his interactions with Gates and an unidentified "Person A", and about his role in the production of a report on the trial of former Ukrainian Prime Minister Yulia Tymoshenko. He also pleads guilty to deleting emails sought by Mueller's office, according to investigators. Van der Zwaan is the son-in-law of Ukrainian-Russian billionaire German Khan, who appeared in the Steele dossier and is suing Buzzfeed News over its publication. In the statement of the offense, Konstantin Kilimnik is identified as "Person A", and the firm Skadden, Arps, Slate, Meagher & Flom as "Law Firm A".
- February 21:
  - NBC News reports that federal investigators are looking into whether Manafort promised a Chicago banker, Stephen Calk, president of the Federal Savings Bank of Chicago, a job in the Trump White House in return for $16 million in home equity loans.
  - The Daily Beast reports that the Republican majority has blocked requests from the Democratic minority to subpoena the Twitter direct messages of Trump Jr., Stone, and other people in Trump's orbit in order to verify their veracity before the committee.
  - The Senate Intelligence Committee interviews Berkowitz.
- February 22:
  - Sam Nunberg, one of Trump's earliest campaign advisers, meets with Mueller's investigators.
  - Mueller reveals new charges in the Manafort and Gates cases, filed on February 22. Unlike previous indictments, the superseding indictment was issued by a federal grand jury in the District Court for the Eastern District of Virginia, and contains 32 counts: 16 related to false individual income tax returns, seven of failure to file reports of foreign bank and financial accounts, five of bank fraud conspiracy, and four of bank fraud. The alleged conduct began in 2005 and continued into 2018.
  - Former D.C. federal prosecutor Thomas Green formally joins Gates' legal team.
- February 23:
  Rick Gates statement of the offense
  - Gates pleads guilty to one count of conspiracy against the United States and one count of making false statements. He becomes the fifth defendant publicly charged by Mueller's team to plead guilty and the third Trump associate to make a cooperation deal with Mueller. In a statement issued by his lawyer, Manafort says he has no plans to follow suit and make a deal. In the statement of the offense, Mercury Public Affairs is identified as "Company A", Podesta Group as "Company B", and Dana Rohrabacher as "Member of Congress".
  - The Los Angeles Times reports that Gates's conviction of making false statements to investigators stems from a 2013 Ukraine-related meeting with Representative Rohrabacher. Gates purportedly told investigators that the meeting was not related to his or Manafort's work in Ukraine despite documents to the contrary.
  - Gates's plea reveals that he lied during an FBI interview on February 1. That same day, his attorneys withdrew from representing him.
  - Mueller reveals a new superseding indictment against Manafort, containing five counts: conspiracy against the United States, conspiracy to launder money, unregistered agent of a foreign principal, false and misleading Foreign Agents Registration Act (FARA) statements, and false statements.
  - The Senate Intelligence Committee interviews Beniaminov.
- February 24: The House Intelligence Committee releases the 10-page Democratic rebuttal to the Nunes memo.
- February 24–27: Manafort reaches out to Alan Friedman multiple times in an effort to coach him on what to say about their work in Ukraine. Later, Friedman informs the FBI of Manafort's inappropriate contacts. Manafort is charged with witness tampering in June and pleads guilty in September. In Manafort's statement of the offense, Friedman is identified as "Person D1".
- Late February – Early March: Mueller's team questions Russian oligarch Viktor Vekselberg and searches his electronics upon his arrival at a New York-area airport.
- February 25: PSY Group CEO Royi Burstien announces that the company is shutting down. The timing of the announcement is later considered interesting because it occurs the same week Nader testifies before Mueller's grand jury.
- February 27:
  - Buzzfeed News reports that Mifsud claimed to his former girlfriend that he was friends with Russian foreign minister Sergei Lavrov. Mifsud subsequently goes missing, having last been seen on October 31, 2017.
  - Charges against Gates are dismissed without prejudice, following his guilty plea.
  - Hope Hicks testifies before the House Intelligence Committee. She declines to answer most questions, saying she has been instructed by the White House not to answer any questions relating to her time at the White House, but admits that she has told lies for Trump.
  - In Senate testimony, NSA director Mike Rogers says Trump has given him "no new authority" to counter Russian election meddling.
  - CNN reports that Mueller's investigators asked witnesses questions about Trump's business dealings in Russia prior to his presidential campaign, including the 2013 Miss Universe pageant held in Moscow. The investigators also inquired about the timing of Trump's decision to run for president.
  - Mueller's team interviews Gates.
- February 28:
  - Manafort pleads not guilty in the D.D.C. Federal District Judge Amy Berman Jackson subsequently sets his trial to start on September 17, 2018. Manafort pleads guilty on September 14.
  - NBC News reports that Mueller's team is asking "pointed questions" about whether Trump knew that the DNC emails had been stolen before it was publicly known, and whether he was involved in their "strategic release".
  - Hicks submits her resignation as White House Communications Director.
  - The New York Times reports that one company lent the Kushners' business $184 million, and another $325 million. Both had held White House meetings with Kushner. The SEC subsequently drops its investigation into Apollo Global Management, which gave Kushner the $184 million loan a month earlier.
  - ExxonMobil announces that it will end its joint ventures with Rosneft for exploration and research, due to U.S. and European Union sanctions against Russia.
  - The Washington Post reports that Mueller's team has questioned witnesses about Trump's apparent pressure on Sessions to resign during the summer of 2017.
  - Kilimnik reaches out several times to Eckart Sager in an effort to coach him on what to say about their work with Manafort in Ukraine. Later, Sager informs the FBI of Kilimnik's inappropriate contacts, and Kilimnik and Manafort are subsequently charged with witness tampering in June. Manafort pleads guilty in September. In Manafort's statement of the offense, Sager is identified as "Person D2".
  - Mueller's team interviews McGahn for the fourth of six times.
  - Mueller's team interviews Gates.

=== March ===
- March: Mueller's team informs Session's lawyer that Sessions will not face prosecution for lying to Congress about his interactions with Russians.

Sam Nunberg subpoena attachment

- March 1:
  - Bipartisan leaders of the Senate Intelligence Committee, Richard Burr and Mark Warner, state that Republicans on the House Intelligence Committee leaked private messages between Warner and a lawyer associated with Deripaska, as Warner attempted to contact Steele. Burr and Warner reprimand Ryan for Nunes's behavior.
  - NBC News reports that Mueller is preparing indictments against Russians and accomplices who engaged in criminal hacking and dissemination of private information intended to hurt Democrats in the 2016 election.
  - The Daily Beast reveals new details about the Internet Research Agency gathered from a leak of internal documents. The new information shows that the Russian troll farm used Reddit and Tumblr as part of its influence campaign.
  - Mueller's team interviews Flynn's lawyer Rob Kelner about an intimidating voicemail Trump's personal lawyer John M. Dowd left on November 22, 2017.
  - Mueller's team interviews Gates.
- March 2:
  - In an interview with Megyn Kelly broadcast on NBC News on March 10, 2018, Putin suggests that the 13 individuals Mueller indicted may not be Russians, saying, "Maybe they are not even Russians, but Ukrainians, Tartars, or Jews, but with Russian citizenship, which should also be checked: maybe they have dual citizenship or a Green Card; maybe the US paid them for this. How can you know that? I do not know either."
  - The Intercept reports that Jared Kushner and his father Charles Kushner made a proposal to Qatar's finance minister, Ali Sharif Al Emadi, in April 2017 to secure investment into 666 Fifth Avenue, a building the Kushner family owns. When the proposal was rejected, a group of Middle Eastern countries, with Jared Kushner's backing, initiated a diplomatic assault that culminated in a blockade of Qatar. Kushner specifically undermined Secretary of State Rex Tillerson's efforts to end the standoff.
- March 3: The New York Times reports that Mueller's team has questioned advisor to the United Arab Emirates George Nader and pressed other witnesses for specifics about possible attempts by the Emiratis to purchase influence by directing money to support Trump during the 2016 campaign.
- March 4:
  - The New York Times reports that the State Department has not used any of the $120 million fund that it was allocated by Congress in late 2016 to counter foreign efforts to meddle in the upcoming elections.
  - Axios reports that Mueller has issued a subpoena to an unnamed witness for all his/her communications, emails, texts, handwritten notes, etc., regarding Trump and nine others (Carter Page, Corey Lewandowski, Hope Hicks, Keith Schiller, Cohen, Paul Manafort, Rick Gates, Roger Stone, and Steve Bannon) from November 1, 2015, to the present.
- March 5:
  - The New Yorker reports that Steele has briefed Mueller on one of his undisclosed memos that purportedly makes the claim that the offer for the position of Secretary of State to former Republican presidential nominee Mitt Romney was rescinded after the Kremlin intervened to voice its displeasure with the pick.
  - Sam Nunberg publicly discloses that he has received a subpoena from Mueller. In live interviews with MSNBC and CNN, Nunberg initially says he will defy the grand jury's order to produce documents and testimony. That evening, Nunberg says he has decided he will comply with the subpoena. He attributes his erratic behavior to the influence of drugs and alcohol and says he will seek treatment after fulfilling his obligations to Mueller.
- March 6:
  - The Washington Post reports that Mueller is requesting documents and asking witnesses questions about Cohen's involvement in the aborted project for a Trump Tower in Moscow and the February 2017 Russia-friendly Ukraine peace proposal.
  - The New York Times reports that George Nader, an adviser to the United Arab Emirates, is cooperating with Mueller, and gave testimony last week to the grand jury.
- March 7:
  - The Wall Street Journal reports that the Russian influence campaign gained personally identifying information about individual American citizens through Facebook.
  - The New York Times reports that Trump has questioned people interviewed by Mueller about their interviews. According to legal experts, Trump's queries likely do not constitute witness tampering.
  - The Washington Post reports that Mueller has evidence that the January 2017 Seychelles meeting between Prince and Dmitriev was an effort to establish a back channel to the Kremlin. According to the report, "George Nader's account is considered key evidence—but not the only evidence—about what transpired in Seychelles".
- March 8:
  - Mueller's team interviews Simes for the first of two times.
  - Mueller's team interviews McGahn for the fifth of six times.
  - The Senate Intelligence Committee interviews McFarland.
- March 9:
  - Mueller obtains a letter from Trump addressed to Putin, inviting him to the 2013 Miss Universe pageant in Moscow. The Washington Post reports that "at the bottom of the typed letter, Trump scrawled a postscript adding that he looked forward to seeing 'beautiful' women during his trip."
  - Mueller obtains a new search warrant for five telephone numbers related to Manafort. The warrant is "relat[ed] to ongoing investigations that are not the subject of either of the current prosecutions involving Manafort".
  - Sam Nunberg appears before the grand jury in Washington, D.C.

Minority status of the Russia investigation with appendices

- March 12:
  - Republicans on the House Intelligence Committee announce the end of their investigation, over the objections of Democratic members. Their findings are that Russia interfered to create discord, but that "there was no evidence of collusion" between the Trump campaign and the Russian government, and that Russia did not have a preference for Trump as a candidate. The committee releases its classified report on March 22 and a redacted version on April 27.
  - Tillerson publicly condemns Russia for the use of a nerve agent in the poisoning of Sergei and Yulia Skripal in the United Kingdom.
  - Buzzfeed News reports on a statement Felix Sater made under oath to House Intelligence Committee investigators in December 2017. In it, Sater said that he had been collaborating with U.S. intelligence and law enforcement agencies for more than 20 years, a collaboration that was continuing at the time of his statement.
  - Butina responds to a Federal Election Commission query "about whether or not certain donations had been made to political campaigns."
  - Mueller's team interviews Gates.

- March 13:
  - Trump fires Tillerson and Steve Goldstein, the fourth highest-ranking official at the State Department, who had been sworn in on December 4. Trump announces his intention to nominate Mike Pompeo to replace Tillerson.
  - Adam Schiff, the ranking member of the House Intelligence Committee, criticizes the Republicans' draft report, calling it "little more than another Nunes memo in long form." Democrats on the committee plan to draft their own report on the investigation.
  - House Intelligence Committee democrats issue a 21-page status report outlining the work they consider to be remaining in the investigation.
  - The Washington Post reports that Sam Nunberg and another associate of Roger Stone claim that in 2016 Stone spoke directly to Assange, who informed him that WikiLeaks was in possession of emails stolen from John Podesta before it was publicly known that hackers had obtained the emails.
  - Mueller's team interviews Hicks for a third and final time since December 7, 2017.
- March 15:
  - Trump imposes financial sanctions under CAATSA on the 13 Russian government hackers and front organizations Mueller has indicted.
  - The New York Times reports that Mueller has subpoenaed The Trump Organization to turn over documents, including some related to Russia. It is the first known instance of the special counsel demanding records directly related to Trump's businesses.
  - The U.S. Government accuses the Russian government of engineering a series of cyberattacks targeting United States and European nuclear power plants and water and electric systems.
  - McClatchy reports that Congressional investigators have learned that Cleta Mitchell, a longtime NRA lawyer, expressed concern over the organization's ties to Russia and its possible involvement in funneling Russian money to support Trump's 2016 presidential campaign. Mitchell denies the reports.
- March 16:
  - Sessions fires Andrew McCabe, the deputy director of the FBI.
  - Politico reports that the Federal Election Commission is investigating whether Russian entities funneled money to the Trump campaign through the NRA during the 2016 election. The inquiry was prompted by a complaint lodged by the American Democracy Legal Fund, a political watchdog organization.
  - Facebook suspends Cambridge Analytica and SCL Group for violating its platform policies in 2015.
  - Alfa-Bank sends the Senate Intelligence Committee an unsolicited letter describing its investigation of the alleged 2016 communications between its servers and mail1.trump-email.com that says it received marketing emails sent on the Trump Organization's behalf in 2016 and suggests that is the cause of the DNS activity.
- March 17:
  - The New York Times and The Observer report on Cambridge Analytica's use of personal information acquired by an outside researcher who claimed to be collecting it for academic purposes. As a result, Facebook bans Cambridge Analytica from advertising on its platform. The Guardian reports that Facebook has known about this situation for two years, but has done nothing to protect its users.
  - John M. Dowd, one of Trump's attorneys, calls on Rosenstein to shut down Mueller's investigation.
  - Erik Prince hosts a fundraiser for Representative Dana Rohrabacher.
- March 18: Mueller's team interviews Gates.
- March 19
  - The Guardian reports that Joseph Chancellor, the co-director of Global Science Research (the company that harvested the data from tens of millions of Facebook users before selling it to Cambridge Analytica) has been working for Facebook as a corporate quantitative social psychologist since around November 2015.
  - Channel 4 broadcasts its investigative documentary on Cambridge Analytica.
  - The Senate Intelligence Committee interviews New York Republican Party chairman Ed Cox.
  - The Senate Intelligence Committee interviews Admiral Rogers.

Russian Targeting of Election Infrastructure During the 2016 Election

- March 20
  - The Washington Post reports that Trump failed to follow detailed warnings from his national security advisers when he congratulated Putin on his reelection, including a section in his briefing materials reading "DO NOT CONGRATULATE."
  - The Washington Post reports that the Federal Trade Commission (FTC) is investigating whether Facebook violated its 2011 consent decree when it allowed Cambridge Analytica to access user data without informing users or seeking their permission.
  - The Senate Intelligence Committee releases its preliminary recommendations on election security: "Russian Targeting of Election Infrastructure During the 2016 Election."
  - A judge dismisses Carter Page's September 14, 2017, defamation suit against Yahoo! News and the Huffington Post for lacking factual accusations of defamation.
  - Mueller's team interviews International Republican Institute official Stephen Nix.
- March 21: The New York Times reports that Mueller has given George Nader immunity from prosecution for his testimony relating to his foreign lobbying in relation to Elliott Broidy and the United Arab Emirates.
- March 22:
  - John M. Dowd resigns as Trump's lead lawyer for Mueller's investigation.
  - The Daily Beast reports that Guccifer 2.0, the "lone hacker" who took credit for providing WikiLeaks with stolen emails from the Democratic National Committee, was in fact an officer of Russia's military intelligence directorate (GRU) and that Mueller has taken over the investigation into his criminal activities and his direct contact with Stone.
  - House Judiciary Committee Chairman Bob Goodlatte issues a subpoena demanding Rosenstein hand over various confidential documents, including anything related to the FISA surveillance of Carter Page.
  - The House Intelligence Committee votes along party lines to release its classified Republican report on Russian interference in the 2016 election. Releasing the report effectively ends the committee's investigation. A redacted version of the report is released to the public on April 27.
  - Mueller' team interviews Berkowitz for the second and final time.
  - The Senate Intelligence Committee invites Mifsud for an interview. In November, after several exchanges with his alleged legal counsel, the committee stops pursuing the interview when his attorneys claim they lost contact with Misfud.
- March 23:
  - The British High Court grants the Information Commissioner's Office's application for a warrant to search Cambridge Analytica's London offices.
  - NBC News acquires a memo that attorney Lawrence Levy of Bracewell & Giuliani sent to Bannon, Rebekah Mercer and Cambridge Analytica founder Alexander Nix that said Nix would have to be "recused from substantive management of any such clients involved in U.S. elections" because Nix is not a U.S. national.
  - Trump signs the $1.3 trillion omnibus spending bill in which Congress included strict new punishments against Russia.
  - The Washington Post reports that emails from Papadopoulos, which are among thousands of documents turned over to Mueller, show that he had more extensive contact with key Trump campaign and presidential transition officials than has been publicly acknowledged, and asked the Trump campaign directly before taking meetings with Russian officials.
  - CNN reports that Trump's National Security Council will recommend he expel an undetermined number of Russian diplomats in response to the poisoning of ex-spy Sergei Skripal, 66, and his 33-year-old daughter Yulia on March 4 in Salisbury, England.
  - The Senate Intelligence Committee interviews Sydney Blumenthal.
- March 25: Corey Lewandowski says he turned down Cambridge Analytica three times while Trump's campaign manager. He says he knew Steve Bannon was associated with the company, but not in what way. He insists the campaign did not hire the firm until after he left.
- March 26:
  - BuzzFeed News reports that European security officials, alarmed by of a set of meetings that Papadopoulos held with Greek Defense Minister Panos Kammenos in Europe in the months before and after the 2016 election, have informed investigators. Kammenos is known to be close to Putin.
  - Trump joins other Western countries and expels 60 Russian diplomats in response to the poisoning of Skripal and his daughter on March 4. A few days later, a State Department spokesperson clarifies that Russia can replace the expelled diplomats.
  - The Associated Press reports that George Nader has testified to Mueller that he wired $2.5 million to Elliott Broidy via a Canadian company to fund a lobbying campaign to Republican members of Congress to persuade the U.S. to take a hard line against Qatar, an adversary of the United Arab Emirates.
  - The Senate Intelligence Committee interviews Veselnitskaya.
  - The Senate Intelligence Committee interviews former committee staffer and Fusion GPS associate Dan Jones.

Alex van der Zwaan Government Sentencing Memorandum (Gov.uscourts.dcd.193647.19.0)

- March 27:
  - Christopher Wylie tells U.K. lawmakers that Palantir, a secretive company co-founded by high-profile Trump supporter Peter Thiel, worked with Cambridge Analytica on their ad-targeting in the 2016 election.
  - Ted Malloch is served with a search warrant to clone all of the electronic devices in his possession when he walks off the plane after flying from London's Heathrow to Boston's Logan airport, and is subsequently interrogated by the FBI, who ask about his involvement in the Trump campaign and connections to Nigel Farage and Stone. The FBI agents "seemed to know everything about me", Malloch says later in a statement about his experience. Mueller compels Malloch to testify about the Russian cyber-intrusions. Malloch denies communicating with Corsi and Stone about WikiLeaks, but corrects his statement in his second interview on June 8.
  - Mueller's team interviews Simes for the second of two times.
  - Mueller's team refers the Bijan Rafiekian and Kamil Ekim Alptekin investigations to the DoJ National Security Division, which later passes the investigations to the Eastern District of Virginia.
- March 28:
  - The New York Times reports that in 2017 Trump's attorney John Dowd discussed the idea of Trump pardoning Flynn and Manafort with their attorneys.
  - Evidence related to the sentencing of Alex van der Zwaan is filed in court. "Person A" is revealed to be Konstantin Kilimnik, a former Ukraine-based aide to Gates and Manafort.
  - ProPublica reports that Senate Judiciary Committee chief investigative counsel Jason Foster, empowered by chairman Charles Grassley, has been pseudonymously disparaging the FBI and Mueller's investigation for a year.
  - Ecuador cuts Julian Assange's internet and telephone access at its London embassy, where Assange has been living for nearly six years.
  - Sessions announces the inspector general will investigate FBI surveillance of Carter Page.
  - NRA outside counsel Steven Hart tells ABC News the NRA received only one contribution from a Russian since 2012, the life membership payment from Alexander Torshin.
- March 29
  - The Guardian reports that the FBI made inquiries before the 2016 election campaign into Trump's property dealings in the post-Soviet states including Latvia with individuals close to Putin.
  - Sessions rejects requests by Senator Charles Grassley, Representative Robert Goodlatte, and Representative Trey Gowdy to appoint a special counsel to investigate FBI surveillance of Carter Page, saying the inspector general is already investigating the matter.
- March 30: The Senate Intelligence Committee interviews Simes.

=== April ===
- April:
  - Mueller begins asking witnesses to provide access to the encrypted messaging apps on their personal phones.
  - Butina testifies before the Senate Intelligence Committee in a closed session for eight hours. She tells the committee that Russian billionaire Konstantin Nikolaev funded "Right to Bear Arms" from 2012 to 2014. In July, A spokesperson for Nikolaev confirms the funding support after initial denials.
- Early April: The Ukrainian chief prosecutor freezes the four Paul Manafort investigations his office is conducting and stops cooperating with the Mueller investigation. The timing is considered suspicious because it follows the Trump administration's sale of Javelin missiles to Ukraine.
- April 2
  - The Wall Street Journal reports that Mueller is investigating Roger Stone's claim that he met with Assange in August 2016. In an email sent to Sam Nunberg on August 4, 2016, Stone wrote "I dined with Julian Assange last night." Stone denied the meeting took place.
  - Major Dmitry Dokuchaev of the FSB pleads guilty in Russia to transferring information to a foreign intelligence service. Dokuchaev is wanted by the FBI for his involvement in the August 2013 data breach of 500 million Yahoo! user accounts. It is believed he was involved in the Russian hacking of U.S. election servers in 2016.
  - Mueller's team interviews Annie Donaldson for the second and final time.
- April 3:
  - Dutch attorney Alex van der Zwaan is sentenced to 30 days in federal prison and ordered to pay a $20,000 fine for lying to the FBI about his contacts with a former GRU officer and for withholding documents from the Mueller investigation.
  - Facebook closes the Federal Agency of News (FAN) account. The FAN is a sister organization to the IRA located in the same building in St. Petersburg.
  - Mueller's team interviews Priebus for the third of three times.
  - Outspoken Mueller critic U.S. Representative Matt Gaetz criticizes the Mueller investigation on Lou Dobbs Tonight. During the interview, Flynn sends Gaetz a Twitter direct message saying, "You stay on top of what you're doing. Your leadership is so vital for our country now. Keep the pressure on." In May 2019, the message is revealed in a court filing as evidence of Flynn's outreach to Mueller's critics while he was cooperating with the investigation.
- April 4:
  - CNN reports that Mueller has been questioning Russian oligarchs who traveled into the US, stopping one and searching electronic devices when the private jet landed at a New York area airport.
  - Facebook CEO Mark Zuckerberg, in a call to reporters, says the personal information of up to 87 million people, most of them Americans, may have been improperly shared with Cambridge Analytica during the 2016 election. Facebook announces sweeping changes to many of its APIs—software plugins that allow outside businesses and developers to collect data directly from Facebook.
  - The Washington Post reports that the Trump administration is going to implement new economic sanctions designed to target oligarchs with ties to Putin.
  - Roger Stone tells CNN that he did not travel to London and dine with Julian Assange in August 2016. His statement contradicts an email he sent to Sam Nunberg at the time.
  - Kilimnik reaches out to Eckart Sager and Alan Friedman in an effort to coach them on what to say about their work with Manafort in Ukraine. Later, Sager and Friedman inform the FBI of Kilimnik's inappropriate contacts, and Kilimnik and Manafort are subsequently charged with witness tampering in June. Manafort pleads guilty in September. In Manafort's statement of the offense, Friedman is identified as "Person D1", and Sager as "Person D2".
  - Mueller's team interviews Kushner's executive assistant Catherine Vargas.
  - Mueller's team interviews Giorgi Rtskhiladze, a Russian business executive involved in the Trump Tower Moscow project, for the first of two times.
  - Mueller's team interviews Erik Prince for the first of two times.
  - The Senate Intelligence Committee interviews Sater.
- April 5: Politico reports Mueller moved to seize bank accounts at three different financial institutions last year the day before Manafort was indicted.

Cohen v US – Gov't Opposition to TRO Request

- April 6
  - The United States Treasury implements economic sanctions on seven Russian oligarchs and 12 companies they control, along with 17 top Russian officials, a state-owned weapons-trading company and a subsidiary bank. The high-profile names on the list include Oleg Deripaska, a billionaire with links to Manafort, and Kirill Shamalov, Putin's ex-son-in-law. The press release says, "Deripaska has been investigated for money laundering, and has been accused of threatening the lives of business rivals, illegally wiretapping a government official, and taking part in extortion and racketeering. There are also allegations that Deripaska bribed a government official, ordered the murder of a businessman, and had links to a Russian organized crime group."
  - McClatchy reports Mueller's team spent the week interviewing a Trump Organization associate involved in overseas deals, including Trump-branded properties.
  - Mueller's team interviews Lewandowski.

Michael Cohen search warrants

- April 9:
  - ProPublica reports that Jeff Sessions sought out Elliott Broidy's advice on how the U.S. attorneys should be replaced.
  - The New York Times reports that Mueller is investigating a payment of $150,000 to the Donald J. Trump Foundation by Ukrainian billionaire Victor Pinchuk for a September 2015 speech by Trump at the Yalta European Strategy conference that took place in Kyiv.
  - Based on a referral from Mueller's office, the U.S. Attorney for the Southern District of New York (SDNY) executes a series of search warrants at the law offices, safety deposit box, and hotel room of Cohen, Trump's longtime personal attorney, in relation to the Stormy Daniels affair and other matters.
- April 10:
  - NRA general counsel John Frazer informs Senator Ron Wyden in a letter that the NRA accepted $2,512.85 from people with Russian addresses between 2015 and 2018. He says $525 came from contributions by two individuals, and the rest came from membership dues from 23 individuals. He notes that some of the individuals may be U.S. citizens. He acknowledges that Alexander Torshin is a life member of the NRA. Information in the letter contradicts earlier statements by the NRA.
  - The Hill reports that Boente received an interview request from Mueller a day after the FBI raided Cohen's office.
  - NJ.com reports that Mueller is investigating a series of previously unreported January 2017 meetings in the Seychelles in addition to the reported meeting between Erik Prince and Dmitriev. The meetings include politically connected individuals from Russia, France, Saudi Arabia, and South Africa, and are part of a larger gathering hosted by UAE Crown Prince Mohammed bin Zayed Al Nahyan.
  - Mueller's team interviews Gates.
  - Reddit submits the results of its investigation into IRA activity on its platform to the Senate Intelligence Committee. They find that 944 suspected IRA accounts made over 14,000 posts, with 332 accounts actively engaging with American users. Posts that contained socially or politically divisive content focused on race issues, dispariging Clinton, and police brutality.
- April 11
  - The New York Times reports that the FBI was seeking all records related to the "Access Hollywood" tape in the Cohen raids.
  - Mueller's team interviews Gates.
  - Mueller's team interviews Jared Kushner for the second of two times.
- April 13:
  - McClatchyDC reports that the special counsel has evidence that Cohen visited Prague in 2016, contrary to his denials of ever being there after the publication of the Steele dossier. Released in 2019, the Mueller Report did not investigate the matter, but quoted Cohen's statement to investigators that he had never traveled to Prague.
  - Mueller's team interviews Rob Porter for the first of two times.
- April 15 U.S. ambassador to the United Nations Nikki Haley tells Margaret Brennan on Face The Nation that new U.S. sanctions on Russian companies will be announced the next day. The new sanctions are a consequence of the companies providing material support to Syria's chemical weapons program. Haley's statement follows similar talking points the RNC published the day before. Russian press secretary Dmitry Peskov tells reporters in Moscow the sanctions are "undisguised attempts of unfair competition." Trump cancels the sanctions announcement and postpones the new sanctions indefinitely.
- April 16:
  - Mueller's spokesman puts out a statement saying that many news reports about the investigation are inaccurate.
  - Mikhail Fridman, Petr Aven, and German Khan file a libel suit against Christopher Steele and his business, Orbis Business Intelligence, in the Superior Court of the District of Columbia. They allege that Steele's dossier damaged their reputations. All three are owners of Alfa-Bank.
  - The Senate Intelligence Committee interviews Butina.
- April 18:
  - Cohen drops his libel suits against Buzzfeed and Fusion GPS.
  - Mueller's team interviews Gates. He tells the team that after the DNC hack became public, Manafort repeated a theory promulgated by Kilimnik that Ukraine hacked the DNC servers, not Russia.
  - The Senate Intelligence Committee interviews Steele associate and attorney Jonathan Winer for the second time.

Ex-FBI-Director-James-Comey-s-memos

- April 19:
  - The full Comey memos are released. In May 2019 CNN reports Mueller tried to block the release of Comey's contemporaneous memos over concerns that Trump and other witnesses would change their stories after reading them.
  - The Pittsburgh police department instructs detectives to wear full uniforms and carry riot gear until further notice in case riots occur if Mueller is fired.
  - Mueller's team interviews Gates.
- April 20:
  - The DNC sues the Trump campaign, the Russian government, and WikiLeaks in federal court. Individual defendants include Emin and Aras Agalarov, Mifsud, Assange, Trump Jr., Manafort, Stone, Kushner, Papadopoulos, and Gates. The suit alleges a conspiracy by the defendants to tilt the 2016 election in favor of Trump.
  - Phillip Ruffin contributes $50,000 to The Patriot Legal Expense Fund Trust, the legal fund established in February to help Trump campaign, transition, and White House aides.
  - Mueller's team interviews Cassandra Ford about her @Guccifer2 Twitter account.
  - The Senate Intelligence Committee interviews representatives from Tumblr.
- April 24:
  - The FBI questions Russian heavyweight mixed martial arts fighter Fedor Emelianenko at his Chicago hotel room, according to his manager Jerry Millen. Emelianenko is connected to Trump, Putin, and Cohen.
  - Democrats on the House Judiciary and House Oversight committees interview Christopher Wylie about Cambridge Analytica's harvesting of data from Facebook. Republicans on the committees decline to attend.
- April 25:
  - FBI agents in tactical gear search Butina's apartment. One of the warrants executed is related to a fraud investigation of Paul Erickson.
  - Mueller's team interviews Flynn for the ninth of 11 times.
- April 26: The Senate Judiciary Committee votes to advance bipartisan legislation that protects Mueller from being fired by Trump. Senate Majority Leader Mitch McConnell opposes the legislation, making a full Senate vote unlikely.

The House Intelligence Committee's final report on Russian interference in the 2016 election.

The minority's views on the House Intelligence Committee's final report on Russian interference in the 2016 election.

- April 27
  - Veselnitskaya tells The New York Times that she is an informant for the Russian prosecutor general, Yuri Chaika. She says she has worked with Chaika's office since 2013. Emails obtained by the Times corroborate her admission. Until this interview, Veselnitskaya publicly denied working for the Russian government. In November 2017, she told the Senate Judiciary Committee, "I operate independently of any governmental bodies."
  - The House Intelligence Committee releases a redacted version of its classified final report on Russian active measures. The vote to release follows party lines. The 253-page report, written by the committee's Republican majority, clears Trump and his associates of wrongdoing. The committee's Democrats issue a 99-page unclassified rebuttal criticizing the partisan nature of the majority report.
  - Judge Jackson dismisses Manafort's January 3 lawsuit against Mueller, writing that the suit was "not the appropriate vehicle for taking issue with what a prosecutor has done in the past or where he might be headed in the future."
- April 28: The Guardian reports that the British Foreign Office held a series of meetings with Cambridge Analytica executives in London, Washington, and New York after the 2016 election to "better understand" how Trump won and acquire insights into the "political environment" following his win.
- April 30:
  - The Washington Post reports the House Freedom Caucus drafted articles of impeachment against Rosenstein. Caucus members claim the articles are a "last resort" political weapon to force the Justice Department to accede to their demands.
  - Trump's super-PAC America First Action hosts a small dinner for potential high-dollar donors at the Trump International Hotel in Washington, D.C. Attendees include Trump, Trump Jr., Lev Parnas, Igor Fruman, Jack Nicklaus III, and Barry Zekelman. Ukraine is among the topics discussed at the dinner. Parnas tells Trump that the biggest problem in Ukraine is U.S. Ambassador to Ukraine Marie Yovanovitch, and that she needs to be removed. Trump tells one of his aides, "Get rid of her! Get her out tomorrow. I don't care. Get her out tomorrow. Take her out. OK? Do it." In May, Parnas and Fruman donate $325,000 to America First Action, for which they are indicted in October 2019 under the allegation that it was a straw donation made on behalf of a Russian national. In April 2019, Yovanovitch is removed from her post. In January 2020, Parnas publicly releases Fruman's recording of the dinner.
  - The Senate Intelligence Committee interviews Miss Universe Organization president Paula Shugart.

=== May ===
- May: Butina graduates from American University with a master's degree in international relations.
- May 1:
  - Senate Intelligence Committee investigators interview Caputo.
  - Mueller's team interviews Flynn for the tenth of 11 times.
- May 2:
  - Mueller's team interviews Caputo. Afterward, Caputo tells CNN that Mueller's team is "focused on Russia collusion." One topic of questioning is the relationships between Farage and Trump associates.
  - Cambridge Analytica files for bankruptcy in the U.S. and the U.K. and ceases operations. The company says it lost almost all of its customers and suppliers after news reports describing how it improperly obtained user data from Facebook. Some employees move on to successor companies Data Propria and Emerdata.
  - Ty Cobb, Trump's lead lawyer handling the Mueller investigation, announces he will retire at the end of the month.
- May 3 : Mueller's team interviews Erik Prince for the second of two times.
- May 4: Mueller's team interviews Flynn for the last of 11 times since November 16, 2017.
- May 6: The Associated Press reports Mueller's team interviewed Tom Barrack, one of Trump's closest friends, "months ago". He was questioned about Manafort, Gates, Trump campaign finances, the presidential transition, and Trump's inauguration.
- May 7: The NRA announces board member Oliver North will replace Peter Brownell as president of the organization after Brownell announces he will not seek a second term. The selection of North is unusual because the NRA board normally selects someone who has served two terms each as the first and the second vice president, and North has held neither position. In August, David Corn of Mother Jones points out that the move comes two weeks after the FBI raided Butina's apartment and that Brownell is an associate of Butina.
- May 8:
  - The Senate Intelligence Committee releases a brief report on Russian hacking of election systems in 2016. The report concludes no votes were changed by Russia, but says the intent of the hacking was to undermine confidence in the voting process.
  - NRA spokeswoman Dana Loesch tells David Corn of Mother Jones that there was no December 2015 NRA trip to Moscow.
  - Mueller's team interviews Porter for the second of two times.
- May 9
  - Lawyers for Concord Management and Consulting appear in federal court in Washington, D.C., and plead not guilty on behalf of the company. The company was indicted by Mueller's team on February 16, 2018. It is the first Russian defendant named in the indictment to respond.
  - The Daily Beast reports Mueller's team has interviewed Erik Prince.
- May 10: Mueller's team interviews Rtskhiladze for the second of two times.
- May 11:
  - ABC News reports that Mueller's team is investigating contributions to Trump's inaugural fund made by people with close ties to Russia, Saudi Arabia, the United Arab Emirates, and Qatar.
  - The Senate Intelligence Committee interviews Andrei Shperling.
- May 14:
  - Andrii Artemenko confirms to Politico that he received a subpoena from Mueller to testify before a grand jury on May 18.
  - Lawyers for Concord Management and Consulting file a motion asking the judge to review Mueller's grand jury instructions because they claim Mueller's team failed to show "that the Defendant acted willfully, in this case meaning that Defendant was aware of the FEC and FARA requirements." The essence of their argument is that the company didn't know their actions broke American laws.
  - The Senate Intelligence Committee interviews someone whose name is redacted from volumes 3 and 5 of its report on Russian interference.
- May 16:
  Senate Judiciary Democrats report – "Preliminary Findings About Trump Campaign's Effort to Obtain Incriminating Information on Secretary Clinton from Russia at Trump Tower Meeting"
  - The Senate Intelligence Committee endorses the U.S. intelligence community's assessment that Russia tried to help Trump win the 2016 presidential election, disagreeing with the House Intelligence Committee.
  - The Senate Judiciary Committee releases transcripts of its interviews of Trump Tower meeting participants. The committee indicates that claims by intelligence leaders, such as former National Security Agency Director and United States Cyber Command Commander Mike Rogers, former CIA Director John Brennan, and former Director of National Intelligence (DNI) James Clapper, that Russia meddled in the 2016 election are accurate and that the campaign anticipated a "smoking gun" from Veselnitskaya.
  - Mueller's team subpoenas Jason Sullivan, Stone's social media consultant during the Trump campaign, to provide documents and appear before the grand jury on May 18.
  - The New York Times acknowledges it buried the lead in its pre-election October 31, 2016, Russia–Trump story.
  - The Senate Intelligence Committee holds a closed hearing on Russian interference with a panel of former intelligence directors, including Clapper and Brennan.
- May 17:
  - Mueller files under seal an unredacted copy of the memo defining his investigative mandate in the Virginia federal court overseeing one of Manafort's criminal cases.
  - Mueller's team interviews Kalashnikova.
- May 18:
  - Mueller's team subpoenas John Kakanis, Stone's driver, accountant and operative.
  - U.S. Senators Bob Menendez, Mark Warner, and Sherrod Brown call for a multi-agency inspector-general investigation into the Trump administration's failure to fully implement congressionally mandated CAATSA sanctions against Russia.
- May 20:
  - Trump demands the Justice Department investigate whether the FBI "infiltrated or surveilled" his presidential campaign under Obama's orders. Rosenstein instructs the Justice Department inspector general to look for any inappropriate surveillance of the Trump campaign.
  - A federal filing reveals that the Republican National Committee paid nearly half a million dollars to Trout Cacheris & Janis, a law firm that represents Hicks and others in the Russia investigations.
- May 21:
  - Rosenstein, Wray and Coats meet with Trump at the White House, where Rosenstein agrees that John Kelly will set up a meeting at which congressional leaders can review "highly classified and other information they have requested" related to the Russia probe.
  - Continental Resources, Inc., an oil company whose CEO Harold Hamm is a Trump advisor, contributes $25,000 to The Patriot Legal Expense Fund Trust, the legal fund established in February to help Trump campaign, transition, and White House aides.
- May 22:
  - James Clapper's book Facts and Fears: Hard Truths from a Life in Intelligence is published. In it Clapper says he believes Russia swayed the presidential election to Trump, writing, "Of course the Russian effort affected the outcome. Surprising even themselves, they swung the election to a Trump win. To conclude otherwise stretches logic, common sense, and credulity to the breaking point."
  - Mueller's team interviews Sam Patten. He submits a proffer agreement to the team.
- May 23
  - FBI seizes control of a key server, "VPN Filter", in a Russian botnet that has been linked to the Russian hacking group responsible for the breach of the DNC and the Clinton campaign during the 2016 election.
  - The Senate Intelligence Committee releases documents showing the participants on both sides of the June 9, 2016, Trump Tower meeting appear to have coordinated their public responses about the meeting. The coordination continued at least six months into the Trump Administration.
  - On or just before this date, Kushner receives his permanent security clearance. The clearance is granted after Trump overrides concerns raised by the CIA and the FBI about Kushner's foreign business contacts, including in Israel, the U.A.E., and Russia.
- May 25
  - Mueller's team is reported to be probing associates about Stone's finances, including his tax returns.
  - Spanish anti-corruption prosecutor José Grinda travels to Washington to meet with the FBI. Grinda publicly acknowledges that a few months earlier his office gave the FBI wiretap transcripts of 33 conversations between Alexander Torshin and Alexander Romanov, a now convicted Russian money-launderer.
- May 26: Manafort communicates by text with the Trump administration.
- May 29:
  - The New York Times reports Trump asked Sessions to reconsider his recusal from any Russia investigations.
  - Trump tweets "The Fake Mainstream Media has, from the time I announced I was running for President, run the most highly sophisticated & dishonest Disinformation Campaign in the history of politics."
- May 30:
  - Friends of Paul Manafort create a legal defense fund to help pay his legal bills.
  - Mueller's team interviews Patten.
- May 31:
  - Trump publicly asserts he didn't fire James Comey over the Russia investigation, contradicting his own statements made in May 2017.
  - Mueller's team interviews World Chess Federation official Beatriz Marinello.

=== June ===
- June:
  - A whistleblower gives the House Intelligence Committee a cache of documents detailing the interactions between Arron Banks and Alexander Yakovenko, the Russian ambassador to London. Democrats on the committee begin investigating Banks.
  - Butina offers to assist prosecutors in an investigation of Paul Erickson.
- June 1: NBC News reports the Mueller probe has been asking questions about Richard "Rick" Gerson, a close friend of Jared Kushner. They report Gerson was involved in the Four Seasons Hotel meeting with Crown Prince Mohammed bin Zayed Al Nahyan of Abu Dhabi and Tony Blair in December 2016 and the Seychelles meetings in January 2017.
- June 2: The New York Times publishes a confidential letter Trump's legal team sent Mueller in January that asserts that it is not illegal for the president to obstruct justice because the Constitution gives him the power to, "if he wished, terminate the inquiry, or even exercise his power to pardon." The letter also admits Trump dictated the July 2017 statement about the June 9, 2016 Trump Tower meeting issued to the Times. Trump tweets about the letter an hour before the Times publishes it.
- June 4
  - Trump claims that he can pardon himself. The assertion comes a day after one of his lawyers, Rudolph Giuliani, makes similar statements to the press over the weekend.
  - In a Fox News interview, Simona Mangiante Papadopoulos, the wife of George Papadopoulos, calls for Trump to pardon her husband.
  - At the White House press briefing, Sarah Huckabee Sanders refuses to answer questions about a January letter Trump's lawyers sent to Mueller that was published two days earlier in The New York Times. The letter contradicts past statements Sanders made about Trump.
  - van der Zwaan completes his term of imprisonment.
- June 5
  - Trump blames Sessions for the continuing Russia investigation and says he would have picked someone else to be Attorney General if he had known Sessions was going to recuse himself.
  - Sarah Huckabee Sanders tries to defend her credibility at a White House press briefing. Her August 2017 assertions about Trump's involvement in drafting the response to The New York Times regarding the Trump Tower meeting were contradicted by the January letter from Trump's lawyers the Times published three days earlier.
  - Mueller's team interviews Gerson the first of two times.
- June 6: Mueller's team interviews Christopher Ruddy.
- June 7:
  - The Atlantic reports that the Senate Judiciary Committee is investigating the ties between Cohen and former congressman Curt Weldon. Weldon is a longtime friend of Artemenko, has ties to Vekselberg, and was involved with Artemenko's February 2017 peace plan.
  - Former Obama national security advisor Ben Rhodes writes in his new memoir that the Obama administration first learned of Flynn's December 2016 communications with Kislyak from Trump transition team members and not from "unmasking", as Nunes had alleged.

Paul Manafort and Konstantin Kilimnik superseding indictment June 8, 2018

- June 8
  - Mueller files new obstruction charges against Paul Manafort and his associate, Konstantin V. Kilimnik, for witness tampering. The indictment alleges Manafort and Kilimnik coached witnesses on their stories for Manafort's ongoing criminal cases. The two witnesses mentioned in the indictment are Alan Friedman (as "Person D1"), and Eckart Sager (as "Person D2"). In September, Manafort pleads guilty to the witness tampering charge.
  - Mueller's grand jury in Washington, D.C., questions Andrii Artemenko for several hours about his interactions with Cohen.
  - An unsolicited memo from former U.S. attorney general William Barr arrives at the Justice Department. The memo details Barr's views on the Mueller investigation and his legal theory that the president cannot be charged with obstruction of justice unless he is involved in the explicit destruction of evidence. Assistant Attorney General for the Office of Legal Counsel Steven Engel tells Justice Department staff that he invited Barr for a brown bag lunch with the department on June 27. Engel and his office are responsible for providing the White House with legal opinions and answering their legal questions, but do not provide personal legal advice. In April 2019 the department insists that Barr was invited days before receiving the memo and not because of the memo's contents.
  - Mueller's team interviews Malloc.

- June 9: Mueller's team interviews Hawker for a second time since January 9.
- June 11: Attorney George T. Conway III, who is married to Counselor to the President Kellyanne Conway, publishes an article defending the constitutionality of Mueller's investigation.
- June 12:
  - Arron Banks, the bankroller of the Brexit Leave.EU campaign, tells the Digital, Culture, Media and Sport Committee that he provided the Russian ambassador to the U.K., Alexander Yakovenko, with contact information for the Trump transition team a few days after meeting with Trump at Trump Tower on November 12, 2016.
  - The Senate Intelligence Committee interviews Bo Denysyk.
  - Mueller's team interviews Patten.
- June 13: Court officials accidentally post unredacted court documents on the D.D.C. website identifying the two people referred to as "D1" and "D2" in the June 8 superseding indictment of Manafort. The two are Alan Friedman and Eckart Sager. Both are PR executives at FBC Media and former journalists. The documents are quickly replaced by redacted versions.
- June 14:
  DOJ-OIG Report. (June 14, 2018)
  - The Washington Post reports that Trump and his allies recently launched a public relations campaign to discredit Cohen in case he starts cooperating with the Mueller investigation. The thrust of the campaign is to argue that Cohen will fabricate any compromising evidence he voluntarily hands over to Mueller's team in order to please Mueller.
  - The Department of Justice Inspector General releases a report on FBI and DOJ actions in the 2016 election. The report discusses the contentions between the Trump-Russia investigation and the Clinton email investigation.
- June 15:
  - U.S. District Judge Amy Berman Jackson revokes Paul Manafort's bail for abusing the trust the court placed in him when bail was originally granted. The judge orders Manafort to be jailed.
  - U.S. District Judge Dabney Friedrich rejects Russian-owned Concord Management and Consulting's request that she examine the instructions provided to the grand jury. Concord accused Mueller's prosecutors of giving faulty instructions, tainting the grand jury's decision to approve charges.
  - Mueller's team interviews Gerson the last of two times.
  - Trump tells a press gaggle at the White House that it is "irrelevant" whether he dictated his son's July 2017 statement on the Trump Tower meeting, saying, "It's a statement to the New York Times.... That's not a statement to a high tribunal of judges."
  - Giuliani gives a series of interviews in which he raises the possibility of Trump pardoning Manafort.
  - The Senate Intelligence Committee interviews Stephen Miller.
- June 17:
  - The Washington Post reports that in May 2016 Stone and Caputo met in Miami with a Russian national who reportedly called himself "Henry Greenberg" and, according to Greenberg, a Ukrainian friend Greenberg identified as "Alexei". Caputo and Stone were offered political dirt on Hillary Clinton. The Post's 2018 story is the first time Stone admits to knowingly meeting with any Russian nationals in 2016. Greenberg also goes by the name "Henry Oknyansky".
  - Giuliani tells Jake Tapper on CNN that his and Trump's comments on possible pardons should not be taken as warnings that the possible recipients should not cooperate in criminal prosecutions.
- June 18:
  - Lawyers for Andrew Miller, a former associate of Roger Stone, challenge in court a subpoena he received for information about Stone, WikiLeaks, "Guccifer 2.0", "DCLeaks", and Julian Assange. Miller's lawyer Alicia Dearn asserts at the hearing that Miller had asked for immunity regarding political action committee transactions involving himself and Stone.
  - Christopher Steele is deposed in London by lawyers for Aleksej Gubarev. Gubarev is seeking information on the Steele dossier to help his libel suit against BuzzFeed.
- June 20:
  - Mueller's team interviews Dearborn for the second and final time.
  - The Senate Intelligence Committee holds a closed hearing on the policy response to Russian interference in the 2016 U.S. elections.
- June 21: U.S. District Court Judge Amy Berman Jackson rejects a motion to suppress evidence found in a search of Manafort's storage locker on May 27, 2017. The defense argued the evidence was improperly collected because the FBI entered the locker without a search warrant, even though the FBI left and returned with a warrant after seeing the locker's contents. The judge ruled the evidence was properly collected because the Manafort associate who opened the locker was on the lease, had a key, and voluntarily let the FBI in.
- June 22: Judge Jackson rejects a request to toss out a money laundering charge against Manafort. His lawyers argued that receiving tens of millions of dollars for lobbying while an unregistered foreign agent was not illegal in itself. Instead, they argued, failing to register was the illegal act. The judge ruled, "It is a crime to 'act' [as a foreign agent] 'unless' one has registered – the statute does not simply state that the failure to register is unlawful[.]"
- June 24: Credico tells Jimmy Dore that he received a request from Mueller for a voluntary interview. Credico tells The Daily Beast that he will refuse to speak to Mueller's team unless he is subpoenaed.
- June 25:
  - ABC News reports that Erik Prince gave Mueller's team "total access to his phones and computer."
  - Mueller's team interviews Mashburn.
- June 27: The Office of Legal Counsel holds a brown-bag lunch at the Department of Justice with William Barr as featured speaker. When The Guardian reports on the lunch in April 2019, a spokesperson for the department insists that Barr's invitation was routine and that his June 8 memo was not discussed at the lunch.
- June 28: The House of Representatives passes H. Res 970 subpoenaing FISA surveillance on a party line vote with Congressman Justin Amash voting present.
- June 30:
  - The federal judge overseeing the Concord Management and Consulting case rejects the defense attorneys' request to share evidence with co-defendant Yevgeniy Prigozhin, which they insisted was critical to their defense. The judge also bars the defense attorneys "from sharing sensitive case materials from any foreign national without court approval."
  - Major donor to the Trump campaign Geoffrey Palmer contributes $100,000 to The Patriot Legal Expense Fund Trust, the legal fund established in February to help Trump campaign, transition, and White House aides.

== See also ==
- Assessing Russian Activities and Intentions in Recent US Elections
- Business projects of Donald Trump in Russia
- Criminal charges brought in the Mueller special counsel investigation
- Cyberwarfare by Russia
- Efforts to impeach Donald Trump
- Foreign electoral intervention
- List of lawsuits involving Donald Trump
- Propaganda in post-Soviet Russia
- Russian interference in the 2016 Brexit referendum § Timeline
- Russian interference in the 2018 United States elections
- Social media in the 2016 United States presidential election
- Timelines related to Donald Trump and Russian interference in United States elections
- 2017–18 United States political sexual scandals
