= Timeline of investigations into Donald Trump and Russia (January–June 2019) =

This is a timeline of events in the first half of 2019 related to investigations into links between Trump associates and Russian officials relating to the Russian interference in the 2016 United States elections. It follows the timeline of Russian interference in the 2016 United States elections, both before and after July 2016, until November 8, 2016 (election day), the transition, the first and second halves of 2017, the first and second halves of 2018, and followed by the second half of 2019, 2020, and 2021.

These events are related to, but distinct from, Russian interference in the 2020 United States elections.

== January–June 2019 ==
=== January ===
- January 2: The foreign company fighting a grand jury subpoena filed under seal its reply to Mueller's brief to the Supreme Court. Alston & Bird is an involved law firm. In October 2020, CNN reveals that the company is a state-owned Egyptian bank that may have been the source of funds for Trump's $10 million loan to his campaign on October 29, 2016.
- January 3:
  - The 116th United States Congress convenes with the House under Democratic control.
  - Congressman Brad Sherman refiles articles of impeachment against Trump. The article charges Trump with obstructing justice by firing James Comey.
  - Jerome Corsi asks U.S. District Court Judge Richard J. Leon to take his December 10, 2018, lawsuit against Mueller. Corsi claims the FBI and Mueller's team used "illegal, unconstitutional surveillance" in a "politically-motivated" criminal investigation against him. Judge Leon accuses Corsi's lawyer of "judge shopping" and grants a Justice Department motion to randomly assign the case to another judge.
- January 4: District Judge Beryl A. Howell extends the term of Mueller's grand jury in Washington, D.C., for an unknown amount of time. The grand jury's term was due to expire on January 5.
- January 7: D.C. District Judge Dabney L. Friedrich strongly rebukes the attorneys for Concord Management and Consulting for repeatedly making personal attacks on Mueller's team. The rebuke was triggered by a January 4 filing that questions the trustworthiness of Mueller's office. Friedrich called Concord's recent filings "unprofessional, inappropriate, and ineffective," and said their "relentless personal attacks" would not affect her decision.

D.C. District Court of Appeals decision against a "Corporation" from "Country A"

- January 8:
  - The US Attorney for the Southern District of New York (SDNY) indicts Natalia Veselnitskaya, known for her participation in the meeting in the Trump Tower with top campaign officials on June 9, 2016, for obstruction of justice in an unrelated case. The prosecution alleges that while defending Russian investment company Prevezon Holdings in a New York court, she helped Russian Prosecutor General Yuri Chaika fabricate evidence supporting Prevezon's defense.
  - Paul Manafort's attorneys file response to Mueller's accusations of malfeasance to the DC judge. Portions of the filing that were meant to be redacted are still readable because of incorrectly applied formatting in the document. The redacted portions reveal that prosecutors accused Manafort of lying because he denied and then admitted when prompted that he met with Kilimnik in Madrid, discussed a proposed Ukrainian peace plan with Kilimnik on several occasions, and shared polling data with Kilimnik while working for the Trump campaign.
  - The New York Times reports that while Manafort worked for the Trump campaign he provided Kilimnik with internal polling data for Kilimnik to pass on to Ukrainian oligarchs Serhiy Lyovochkin and Rinat Akhmetov, both of whom Manafort previously did work for in Ukraine.
  - The Supreme Court removes without comment a temporary stay in the legal battle by a "Corporation" from "Country A" fighting a grand jury subpoena. The stay had paused the accrual of fines by the company while it appealed the District Court of Appeals decision from December 18, 2018. This is believed to be the first U.S. Supreme Court decision related to the Mueller investigation.
  - The D.C. Circuit Court of Appeals (D.C. Cir.) issues its full opinion in the appeal by a "Corporation" from "Country A" against a grand jury subpoena. The judges write, "[the company] failed to satisfy its burden of showing that Country A's law would prohibit complying with the subpoena, we agree with the district court that enforcing the subpoena is neither unreasonable nor oppressive." The company immediately appeals the decision to the Supreme Court. In October 2020, CNN reveals that "Country A" is Egypt.
- January 9: The Senate Intelligence Committee interviews Robert Foresman.
- January 10: The first Russia-related hearing of the newly Democratic majority House takes place: Treasury Secretary Steven Mnuchin testifies in a closed-door hearing on the Treasury Department's decision to ease sanctions on companies aligned with Oleg Deripaska. After the hearing, Speaker Nancy Pelosi calls it "one of the worst classified briefings we've received from the Trump administration". She says they spent "most of the time reading an unclassified document". Other Democrats echoed Pelosi.
- January 11:
  - Mother Jones reports that the National Rifle Association of America (NRA) appears to have coordinated ad buys with Republican candidates in at least three U.S. Senate races. Like the scheme reportedly used by the NRA and the Trump campaign, National Media Research, Planning and Placement (NMRPP) CFO Jon Ferrell placed scores of ad buys on behalf of the three senate campaigns and the NRA to air ads within minutes of each other on the same local television stations. The three senate campaigns were Senator Richard Burr's 2016 reelection campaign in North Carolina, Missouri Attorney General Josh Hawley's successful 2018 campaign to unseat Missouri Senator Claire McCaskill, and the unsuccessful 2018 campaign by Montana state auditor Matt Rosendale to unseat Montana Senator Jon Tester.
  - The New York Times reports that the FBI opened counterintelligence and criminal investigations against Trump a few days after he fired Comey in May 2017. They were alarmed by Trump's actions and concerned that he may have been working for Russia against American interests. The investigations were eventually combined and taken over by Mueller.
  - Giuliani tells The Hill that Trump's legal team should be allowed to make corrections to Mueller's final report before it is seen by Congress or the public.
  - The Senate Intelligence Committee interviews Nunberg.

Trump states on January 14, 2019, "I never worked for Russia and you know that answer better than anybody. I never worked for Russia. Not only did I never work for Russia I think it's a disgrace that you even asked that question."

- January 12:
  - The Washington Post reports that Trump ordered his translator for the second Putin meeting at the G20 summit in Hamburg on July 7, 2017, to hand over their notes and not discuss the meeting. The Hamburg meeting was one of five Trump-Putin interactions where no detailed records exist.
  - Trump tells Jeanine Pirro on Justice with Judge Jeanine that Cohen made a plea deal to protect his father-in-law from prosecution. The Mueller report refers to his statements on Cohen in the interview as evidence of witness intimidation.
- January 14:
  - The New York Times reports on the unusually large expenses claimed by the Trump inauguration fund.
  - The Daily Beast reports that Mueller's office and the SDNY are investigating a breakfast meeting involving Flynn, Nunes, Turkish Foreign Minister Mevlüt Çavuşoğlu, and 50–60 other foreign officials at the Trump International Hotel in Washington, D.C., on January 18, 2017. This line of inquiry is part of their investigations into the Trump inauguration fund.
  - The Senate Intelligence Committee interviews Robert Curran.

FBI special agent Jeffrey Weiland's statement on Manafort's breach of his plea agreement.

- January 15:
  - Mueller's team requests a delay in Richard Gates' sentencing because he is still helping with their investigations.
  - Mueller's team files FBI special agent Jeffrey Weyland's partially redacted statement detailing the ways in which they believe Manafort lied to them, including about his contacts with Trump administration officials and his work to help people get positions in the administration. 157 pages of mostly redacted exhibits are included in the filing. They allege Manafort made contradictory statements to the Mueller team on several occasions as well as to the grand jury contradicting himself, other witnesses, and documents.
  - William Barr appears before the Senate Judiciary Committee for his confirmation hearing to become the next Attorney General. Barr refuses to commit to recusing himself from the Mueller investigation or release Mueller's eventual report. He also states that he would not fire Mueller if asked to do so by Trump without good cause. Barr circulated a memo among Trump administration members in 2018 in which he criticized the Mueller investigation.
  - Judge Howell imposes $50,000 a day fines on the foreign company fighting a grand jury subpoena from Mueller for not complying with the subpoena.

Skadden, Arps, Slate Meagher & Flom settlement agreement

- January 17:
  - The Justice Department announces that Skadden, Arps, Slate, Meagher & Flom agreed to pay the U.S. government $4.6 million and retroactively register as a foreign agent for the work they performed for Manafort and the Ukrainian government. $4.6 million is the amount of money Skadden received from the Ukrainian Ministry of Justice and Manafort's offshore bank accounts. In the settlement agreement, which details the actions taken by Skadden on the behalf of Manafort and Ukraine, attorney and former White House counsel Gregory B. Craig is referred to as "Partner-1".
  - BuzzFeed News reports that Cohen gave Trump, Trump Jr., and Ivanka Trump regular and "very detailed" updates about the Trump Tower Moscow project during the 2016 campaign, including that he was discussing the project with Russian government officials. They also report that Cohen told Mueller's team that Trump directed him to lie to Congress about the project.
- January 18:
  - Mueller spokesman Peter Carr refutes some of the information in the January 17 BuzzFeed News article that claimed Trump directed Cohen to lie to Congress. He says, "BuzzFeed's description of specific statements to the special counsel's office, and characterization of documents and testimony obtained by this office, regarding Cohen's congressional testimony are not accurate". BuzzFeed top editor Ben Smith responds, "We stand by our reporting and the sources who informed it, and we urge the Special Counsel to make clear what he’s disputing".
  - Mueller's team interviews Bannon for the fourth and final time.
  - Trump tweets that Cohen lied to reduce his sentence, and finishes with, "Watch father-in-law!" The Mueller Report refers to this tweet as evidence of witness intimidation.
- January 20: Giuliani tells Chuck Todd on Meet the Press that the Trump Tower Moscow project continued through October or November 2016. His statement confirms what Cohen told Mueller's team about the project.
- January 21:
  - In a New York Times interview, Giuliani quotes Trump as saying discussions about the Trump Tower Moscow project were "going on from the day I announced to the day I won." His statement confirms what Cohen told Mueller's team about the project.
  - Giuliani walks back his recent statements on the Trump Tower Moscow project. He issues a public statement saying, "My recent statements about discussions during the 2016 campaign between Michael Cohen and candidate Donald Trump about a potential Trump Moscow 'project' were hypothetical and not based on conversations I had with the president. Trump's personal counsel also sends a letter to Mueller's team stating that Giuliani's public comments "were not intended to suggest nor did they reflect knowledge of the existence or timing of conversations beyond that contained in the President's [written responses to the Special Counsel's Office]."
- January 22: The Supreme Court grants a motion from the "Corporation" from "Country A" to file its appeal under seal in its case challenging a subpoena from Mueller's grand jury. A redacted version of the petition will be made public.
- January 23:
  - Cohen delays his Congressional testimony, citing threats to his family. Senate Intelligence Committee subpoenas Cohen to testify in closed session on February 12.
  - Mueller's team submits followup questions to Trump about the extent of his involvement in the Trump Tower Moscow project.

Roger Stone indictment for one count of obstruction of an official proceeding, five counts of false statements, and one count of witness tampering

- January 24:
  - A grand jury in the District of Columbia indicts Stone on 7 counts; one count of obstructing a congressional proceeding, five counts of false statements, and one count of witness tampering. In the indictment, CrowdStrike is identified as "Company 1", WikiLeaks as "Organization 1", Assange as "the head of Organization 1", Corsi as "Person 1", Credico as "Person 2", and Bannon as "the high-ranking Trump Campaign official". The unnamed reporter mentioned in the indictment is Matthew Boyle of Breitbart News.
  - Corsi's stepson Andrew Stettner testifies before Mueller's grand jury.
- January 25: Trump campaign associate Roger Stone is arrested by the FBI in Fort Lauderdale, Florida.
- January 28:
  - Acting Attorney General Matthew Whitaker announces that the Special Counsel investigation is "close to being completed".
  - Stone pleads not guilty in DC courtroom.
  - Judge T. S. Ellis of the District Court for the Eastern District of Virginia (E.D. Va.) postpones Manafort's February 8 sentencing date to an unspecified date, pending resolution of a dispute in his separate case before the DC District Court (D.D.C.).
- January 29: Mueller's team interviews former Associate Attorney General Rachel Brand.
- January 30: As part of the prosecution of Concord Management and Consulting, a court filing states that Russians leaked confidential evidence collected by the Mueller investigation.

=== February ===
- Early February: The unnamed foreign company fighting a grand jury subpoena from Mueller (an Egyptian bank) gives the Mueller investigation documents totaling around 950 pages, many of which were translated into English. Judge Howell stops the daily fines imposed on the company.
- February 1: Stone appears in court. The judge warns she may impose a gag order. A court filing by Mueller's prosecutors reveals that the FBI seized "voluminous and complex" evidence from Stone's home in Florida, containing emails and financial records.
- February 4:
  - During a closed-door DC District Court hearing, Mueller prosecutor Andrew Weissmann tells judge Amy Berman Jackson that Manafort's lying to investigators about his communications with Konstantin Kilimnik "goes, I think, very much to the heart of what the special counsel's office is investigating" suggesting that Mueller's office continues to examine a possible agreement between Russia and the Trump campaign.
  - Federal prosecutors in Manhattan subpoena documents concerning donors and finances from Trump's inaugural committee. Investigators are particularly interested in potential conspiracy to defraud the U.S., mail fraud, wire fraud, false statements, election fraud, foreign donations, and money laundering.
  - Federal prosecutors in the Southern District of New York request interviews with executives at the Trump Organization.
  - BuzzFeed News reports that Akhmetshin received suspicious payments before and after the Trump Tower meeting totaling $500,000 from Denis Katsyv. Wells Fargo and Bank of America reported the payments to the U.S. Treasury Department, and the reports were passed on to Mueller's team.
- February 5:
  - Thomas J. Barrack Jr., chairman of Trump's inaugural committee, confirms to the Associated Press that he was interviewed by the Mueller team in 2017, but says he was not a target of the investigation.
  - The Democratic-controlled House Intelligence Committee votes to refer dozens of witness testimony transcripts and thousands of other documents to Mueller's office. Committee Republicans had blocked Democrat efforts to release the documents to Mueller's office when Republicans controlled the Committee in 2018.
- February 6: Trump's personal counsel declines to provide Mueller's team with the additional information about the extent of Trump's involvement in the Trump Tower Moscow project that they requested on January 23.
- February 7: Corsi sues Stone for defamation, assault, and intentional infliction of emotional stress in an attempt to prevent him from testifying against Stone.
- February 8: The House Judiciary Committee holds a hearing on Acting Attorney General Matthew Whitaker, focusing primarily on the Mueller probe and his relation to it.
- February 11: Cohen's testimony under subpoena before a closed session of the Senate Intelligence Committee is postponed a third time, at Cohen's request, to an unspecified date.
- February 13:
  - Judge rules that Manafort 'intentionally' lied to the FBI, special counsel and grand jury, negating his plea agreement, including his contacts with his Russian associate during the campaign and later.
  - CNN reports Tyler McGaughey, the husband of William Barr's youngest daughter, was hired by White House Counsel's office, whose work intersects with the Russia investigation. Walter Shaub, the former director of the United States Office of Government Ethics, said McGaughey's beeline for the White House was "concerning."
  - Date for the trial of Michael Flynn's business partner Bijan Kian, the second of a Mueller derived case, is set for July 15.
  - Mueller's team interviews Chris Christie.

- February 14:
  - Mueller's team interviews Gordon the final of four times since August 7, 2017.
  - William Barr is confirmed as Attorney General by the U.S. Senate.
  - Flynn sends outspoken Mueller critic Republican Representative Matt Gaetz images of a bald eagle and an American flag with no accompanying text. In May, the Twitter direct message is revealed in a court filing as evidence of Flynn's outreach to Mueller critics while he was cooperating with the Mueller investigation.
- February 15:
  - U.S. District Judge Amy Berman imposes a limited restriction on the kind of public statement Roger Stone can make about his court proceedings in order to ensure a fair trial and "to maintain the dignity and seriousness of the courthouse and these proceedings." Stone, his lawyers, and his witnesses are banned from making public statements as they enter or exit the courthouse.
  - Sarah Huckabee Sanders confirms to the press that she is "happy to voluntarily" sit for an interview with Mueller's investigators and says that the President urged her to "fully cooperate."
  - The New Jersey Attorney General subpoenas the Trump inaugural committee for records relating to fundraising events and "solicitations" conducted in New Jersey, copies of ledgers, tax forms, contracts and "all documents related to any benefits provided to donors."
- February 17: The Guardian reports that Brittany Kaiser, former business development director of SCL Group, the parent company of Cambridge Analytica, was subpoenaed by Robert Mueller. Her spokesman said she was cooperating fully with his investigation. She is the first person with links to both Brexit and the Trump campaign known to have been questioned by Mueller.
- February 20:
  - Judge William Pauley grants Cohen's request to postpone his prison surrender date from March 6 to May 6 so he can further recover from recent shoulder surgery.
  - Cohen agrees to testify before open session of House Oversight Committee on February 27.
  - The Senate Intelligence Committee interviews international political consultant George Birnbaum.
- February 21: Senate Intelligence Committee reportedly pursuing David Geovanis for questioning.
- February 26:
  - Cohen testifies in closed session before the Senate Intelligence Committee.
  - The D.C. Circuit Court of Appeals ruling that Mueller was legally appointed
    A three-judge panel of the D.C. Circuit Court of Appeals rules that Mueller was legally appointed. The judges let stand a July 31, 2018, lower court ruling ordering Andrew Miller, a former aide to Roger Stone, to obey a grand jury subpoena from Mueller. The case was brought by Miller in an attempt to avoid testifying before Mueller's grand jury.
- February 27: Cohen testifies before open session of House Oversight Committee.
- February 28:
  - Cohen testifies in closed session before the House Intelligence Committee.
  - House Oversight Committee chairman Elijah Cummings states his intention to interview Trump Jr., Ivanka Trump and Trump Organization CFO Allen Weisselberg. House Intelligence Committee chairman Adam Schiff states he will call Weisselberg to testify.
  - In the Concord Management case, Mueller's team argues that over three million documents should not be exported to Russia under discovery rules.
  - Mueller's team interviews McGahn for the final of six times.
  - The Senate Intelligence Committee interviews Kushner.

=== March ===
- March 4: House Judiciary Committee sends letters seeking information and documents from 81 organizations and individuals associated with Trump.
- March 6: Cohen gives additional testimony before House Intelligence Committee.
- March 7: Manafort is sentenced by Judge T. S. Ellis III (of E.D. Va.) to 47 months in prison in Virginia for tax evasion and bank fraud, "far lighter than the 19- to 24-year prison term recommended under sentencing guidelines".
- March 8: Corsi and Larry Klayman file a defamation lawsuit against Alex Jones and InfoWars. The suit claims InfoWars gave Stone a platform to "improperly influence the Mueller investigation," and that Stone and Jones made defamatory statements about Corsi and Klayman in videos posted on the InfoWars website.
- March 11: The Senate Intelligence Committee interviews Mangiante.
- March 12: Mueller prosecutors and Mike Flynn jointly requested and received a 90-day extension for his sentencing, originally scheduled for March 18, stating that his cooperation with the Mueller investigation was complete but he may cooperate further in the prosecution of his former business partner, Bijan Kian, scheduled to begin in July.
- March 13:
  - Manafort is sentenced in DC District Court (D.D.C.) to 73 months in prison, thirty of which to be served concurrently with his previous sentence in Virginia. The length of his federal prison sentences is expected to total 7.5 years.
  - Minutes after his sentencing, New York State announced that Manafort had been charged with 16 state felonies, including residential mortgage fraud.
- March 15:
  - U.S. District Judge Henry E. Hudson dismisses Scott Comer's, Roy Cockrum's, and Eric Schoenberg's lawsuit against the Trump Campaign and Stone, which was originally filed on July 12, 2017, for failing to plead viable privacy claims and lacking a substantive cause of action for conspiracy, but not for the First Amendment defense made by Stone and the Trump Campaign.
  - Aleksandr Kogan, the data scientist hired by Cambridge Analytica to harvest Facebook data in 2015, sues Facebook for defamation over their claims that he deceived the company about his activities.
- March 18: Propublica reports federal authorities raided Republican fundraiser Elliott Broidy's office in July 2018, seeking materials related to foreign officials dealings with Trump administration associates, including Gates and Nader, regarding conspiracy, money laundering, and crimes associated with illegal lobbying on behalf of foreign officials.

Michael Cohen search warrants

- March 19:
  - The Michael Cohen search warrants are unsealed by a federal judge in New York.
  - Mueller's team interviews Cohen for the seventh and final time.

Letter from U.S. Attorney General William Barr announcing his receipt of the Mueller Report

- March 20: Ukrainian Prosecutor General Yuriy Lutsenko tells John Solomon in an interview on Hill.TV that his office is investigating claims that the National Anti-Corruption Bureau of Ukraine attempted to interfere in the 2016 U.S. election to help Clinton. He also claims the U.S. ambassador to Ukraine Marie Yovanovitch gave him a "do not prosecute" list at their first meeting after he took office in 2016, which the State Department denies as "an outright fabrication."
- March 22:
  - Mueller concluded the Special Counsel investigation and has submitted his long-anticipated report to Attorney General William Barr. Barr stated that he may be able to give details regarding the report as soon as the weekend (March 23–24) to Congress. Mueller's prosecutors identified 272 contacts between the Trump team and Russia-linked operatives.
  - The Electronic Privacy Information Center (EPIC) files a lawsuit under the U.S. Freedom of Information Act (FOIA) attempting to compel the Justice Department to release a copy of the Mueller Report.

Letter from Attorney General William P. Barr on March 24, 2019, to leaders of the House and Senate judiciary committees with the summary of the investigation.

- March 24:
  - Attorney General William Barr releases a four-page letter to Congress highlighting the key findings by the Special Counsel's final report. Barr stated that there is not sufficient evidence that Trump obstructed justice or colluded with Russia, but did not exonerate him on obstruction.
  - The Office of Legal Counsel (OLC) writes a memorandum providing the legal justification for not charging Trump with obstruction. The OLC writes the memorandum in tandem with Barr writing his letter, and finishes it after he transmitted his letter to Congress.
- March 25:
  - House Intelligence Committee testimony from former Trump business associate Felix Sater, who worked with Cohen on Trump Tower Moscow project, previously scheduled for March 27, is postponed to undetermined date.
  - The U.S. Supreme Court declines to hear an appeal by the unidentified company (an Egyptian bank) fighting a Mueller grand jury subpoena. Mueller has transferred the case to the Washington, D.C., U.S. Attorney's office.
  - The Senate Intelligence Committee serves Prince a subpoena for documents and to appear before the committee.

Letter from Robert Mueller III to William P. Barr objecting to Barr's characterization of the conclusions of the Mueller Report.

- March 27:
  - Assistant U.S. attorney David Goodhand tells Judge Howell that Mueller's grand jury is still active and is "continuing robustly". He made the declaration in a hearing on the unidentified foreign government-owned company's fight against a grand jury subpoena.
  - In a joint letter, the House intelligence committee demands that Mueller "must" brief them and provide "all materials, regardless of form and classification, obtained or produced".
  - Rep. Rashida Tlaib (D-MI) introduces H.Res.257, authorizing an impeachment investigation. It is referred to the House Rules Committee.
  - Mueller sends Barr a letter in which he asserts that Barr's March 24 letter "did not fully capture the context, nature, and substance of this Office's work and conclusions" leading to "public confusion about critical aspects of the results of our investigation".
- March 28:
  - U.S. District Judge Tanya S. Chutkan sets Butina's sentencing hearing for April 26 after Assistant U.S. Attorney Erik Kenerson tells the court that prosecutors are ready.
  - Jared Kushner meets with the Senate Intelligence Committee.

Letter from Attorney General William P. Barr on March 29 to the chairs of the House and Senate Judiciary Committees

- March 29:
  - EPIC files a motion requesting a preliminary injunction that would force the Justice Department to expedite EPIC's FOIA request for the Mueller Report. The judge schedules a hearing for April 9.
  - Barr sends a subsequent letter to Senator Lindsey Graham and Congressman Nadler informing them that he expects the redacted form of the Mueller Report will be given to Congress in mid-April at the latest. He also clarifies that his March 24 letter provided a summary of the nearly 400-page report's "principal conclusions" and was not intended to be a summary of the entire report. He also states that there are no plans for the White House to review the report before it is delivered to Congress.

=== April ===
Court order keeping name of company secret while grand jury is active

- Spring: Giuliani consults with Manafort via Manafort's lawyer on the existence of the Ukrainian "black ledger" as part of his investigation into whether the ledger was fabricated with the assistance of the U.S. government in order to help Clinton win the 2016 presidential election. Manafort tells Giuliani that the ledger didn't exist.
- April 1: Judge Howell rejects a request from the Reporters Committee for Freedom of the Press to unseal the name of the company fighting a Mueller grand jury subpoena, but agrees to let them see edited versions of briefs and pleadings in the court battle. She also leaves open the possibility of unsealing the name when the grand jury is finished with their investigation.
- April 2: EPIC announces that the Justice Department agreed to expedite its FOIA request for the Mueller Report after the group filed suit in federal court on March 22 and requested expedited service on March 29.
- April 3:
  - The House Judiciary Committee votes 24–17 to authorize committee chairman Nadler to issue subpoenas for the unredacted version of the Mueller Report and any exhibits, underlying evidence, or other materials prepared for the investigation.
  - The House Ways and Means Committee chairman Richard Neal formally requests copies of Trump's personal and business tax returns covering 2013 to 2018 from the IRS, and sets April 10 as the deadline for the response. By law, the committee has the authority to see anyone's confidential tax returns.
  - The New York Times reports that some of Mueller's investigators expressed concerns that attorney general Barr is downplaying the findings of their report.
- April 5:
  - Trump attorney William S. Consovoy sends a letter to Treasury Department general counsel Brent J. McIntosh that calls Neal's request for Trump's tax returns a "gross abuse of power" and urges the department to wait for a legal opinion from the Justice Department before turning over any of Trump's tax information.
  - A Justice Department court filing in response to EPIC's March 29 expedited FOIA request for the Mueller Report states that the department is processing 415 requests regarding the Mueller investigation, and that 198 of the requests came after Barr's March 22 announcement that the investigation was over.
  - A three-judge panel of the U.S. Court of Appeals for the D.C. Circuit rules in a split decision that grand jury materials can only be disclosed to prosecutors, defendants, and other grand juries as mandated by the Federal Rules of Criminal Procedure, and to the U.S. House of Representatives as authorized by a 1974 ruling by U.S. District Judge John J. Sirica. Sirica's ruling said that a House oversight investigation "in this setting acts simply as another grand jury". While the Appeals Court ruling is in a case unrelated to the Mueller investigation, its decision is expected to affect any legal actions the House may undertake to acquire the Mueller Report and any supporting grand jury material.
  - The Senate Intelligence Committee sends letter to Walter Soriano and owner of USG Security Ltd based in Britain for his communication with Manafort and Flynn, Psy-Group/Wikistrat, and Black Cube, Orbis Business Intelligence (a firm co-founded by Christopher Steele). Soriano has links to Deripaska.
  - Corsi and Klayman file a lawsuit against Caputo and Stone that, in part, accuses Stone of using Caputo as a mouthpiece to evade his judicial gag order.
- April 7:
  - Giuliani tells Howard Kurtz on MediaBuzz that he learned a few months before that a group of people in Ukraine colluded with the Clinton campaign during the 2016 Presidential election to help Clinton. He states that he wants the Ukraine government to investigate.
  - Prince's lawyer informs the Senate Intelligence Committee that Prince will invoke his Fifth Amendment rights instead of testifying before the committee.
- April 8:
  - Prosecutors from the U.S. attorney's office in Washington, D.C., file their sentencing recommendations for Patten in federal court in advance of his April 12 sentencing hearing. They say that Patten committed to being a witness against Manafort in his second trial, which was cancelled when Manafort pleaded guilty, and met with prosecutors several times to explain documents and answer questions. They cite his "substantial assistance" as the basis for recommending a lenient sentence. In a separate filing, Patten's lawyers ask for a sentence of probation and insist he did not know Kilimnik was connected to Russian intelligence even though they owned a company together. Kilimnik is identified as "Person A" in the prosecutor's filings and named directly in Patten's filings.
  - The FBI reveals in a court filing that Comey was a witness in the Mueller investigation and that his memos on his meetings with Trump were of interest in the investigation. The filing was part of a court case brought by CNN about a FOIA request for Comey's memos.
  - Nunes files a $150 million lawsuit against The McClatchy Company, owner of the Fresno Bee, in Virginia state court in which he claims that a McClatchy reporter conspired with Republican political consultant Liz Mair to interfere with the House Intelligence Committee's investigations of the Clinton campaign and Russian election interference.
- April 9:
  - In a hearing that begins half an hour before Barr testifies before Congress, U.S. District Court Judge Reggie Walton denies EPIC's March 29 request for an injunction to expedite the release of the Mueller Report.
  - Barr appears before the House Appropriations Committee for a hearing on the Justice Department budget, and members ask him about the Mueller Report. He says no one outside the Justice Department read his March 24 letter about the Mueller Report before it was sent to Congress, but then later clarifies that the White House was told about the letter when it was sent, and the letter may have been read to them over the phone. He also says that Mueller and his team declined an opportunity to review the letter before it was sent. He declined to answer when asked if he consulted the White House before releasing the letter, saying, "I've said what I'm going to say about the report today." He tells the committee that he expects to send the redacted report to the House Judiciary Committee within a week with color coded redactions so that people can tell what kind of material was redacted, but refuses to give Congress the full unredacted report and says it is up to Congress to ask a court for the grand jury material.
  - U.S. Treasury Secretary Steven Mnuchin tells two congressional committees that White House lawyers had an "informational" discussion with Treasury department lawyers about a potential request for Trump's tax returns before Congress formally requested them. He tells the committees that he thinks such discussions are appropriate, but emphasizes that he will not take direction from Trump on whether or not to release the tax returns to Congress. He says, "We would not ever ask for the White House’s permission on this, nor did they give us permission."
- April 10:
  - Mnuchin sends a letter to the House Ways and Means Committee in which he states that the Treasury Department will miss the committee's April 10 deadline for receiving Trump's tax returns because he is going to consult with the Justice Department about the legality of their April 3 request. He writes, "The Committee’s request raises serious issues concerning the constitutional scope of congressional investigative authority, the legitimacy of the asserted legislative purpose, and the constitutional rights of American citizens".
  - Barr tells the Senate Appropriations Committee that Mueller did not ask him or Congress to determine whether Trump obstructed justice. He tells the committee, "I don't know whether Bob Mueller supported my conclusion." He again states that he expected to release the Mueller Report within a week. He also tells the committee that the government spied on the Trump campaign, but then later says, "I am not saying that improper surveillance occurred. I'm saying that I'm concerned about it and looking into it, that's all."
  - The Wall Street Journal reports that the U.S. Attorney's office for SDNY interviewed Hope Hicks and Keith Schiller after learning about phone calls they each had with David Pecker shortly after American Media, Inc.'s payment to Karen McDougal was revealed in November 2016. The Journal also reports that SDNY investigators have a recording of a phone call between Michael Cohen and McDougal's lawyer, Keith Davidson.
  - Republican Representative Matt Gaetz introduces a bill that would remove Schiff from his position as chairman of the House Intelligence Committee and strip him of his security clearance. The move comes amid increasing partisan attacks on Schiff by Republican lawmakers and the President.

Gregory Craig indictment

- April 11: Former Obama White House counsel Gregory Craig is indicted for lying to the Justice Department's Foreign Agents Registration Act (FARA) Unit. He is accused of lying about the work he and his former law firm, Skadden, Arps, Slate, Meagher & Flom, did for Manafort and the Ukrainian government. The investigation of Craig was started by Mueller's team, then moved to SDNY, and was finally moved to the U.S. Attorney's office for the District of Columbia. According to the indictment, Craig and other members of the law firm discussed FARA registration in February 2012, told the Ministry of Justice of Ukraine in August 2012 that their work would not require FARA registration, received subsequent legal advice that the firm needed to register their work under FARA, and then altered and backdated documents to hide the nature of their work and avoid registration. Craig is not charged for failing to register under FARA because the statute of limitations has expired.
- April 12:
  - Patten is sentenced to three years of probation, 500 hours of community service, and fined $5,000 by Judge Jackson. The judge notes Patten's assistance to prosecutors, acceptance of blame, and that he didn't try to enrich himself as reasons for the lenient sentence. She says his cooperation is the main reason he avoided prison time for lying to Congress.
  - The Washington Post reports that researchers at Clemson University found the IRA sent thousands of tweets during the 2016 election campaign in an attempt to drive Bernie Sanders supporters away from Hillary Clinton and towards Donald Trump.
  - Craig appears in federal court in Washington, D.C., and pleads not guilty after being indicted the day before. He is released on personal recognizance.
  - Andrew Miller's lawyers file a petition with the D.C. Court of Appeals asking the court to compel prosecutors to declare whether they are still pursuing grand jury testimony from Miller and, if they are, to accept an appeal to the full court of the court's three-judge ruling against Miller in February. They argue that the case is moot since Stone has been indicted and "Mueller's authority expired".

Letter from Richard Neal to Charles Rettig demanding Trump's tax returns by April 23

- April 13: Neal sends a letter to IRS Commissioner Charles Rettig demanding Trump's tax returns by end of business on April 23. The letter lays out a legal argument citing judicial precedents showing he has the authority to demand the documents and the Treasury Department does not have the authority to refuse.
- April 15: The House Intelligence and Financial Services committees issue subpoenas to Deutsche Bank, JPMorgan Chase, Bank of America, and Citigroup demanding documents related to Trump and possible money laundering by people in Russia and Eastern Europe.
- April 17:
  - The New York Times reports that there have been numerous conversations between White House lawyers and the Justice Department about the contents of Muller's report.
  - Along with the four banks reported subpoenaed April 15, additionally Morgan Stanley, Wells Fargo & Co, Capital One Financial Corp., Royal Bank of Canada, and Toronto Dominion Bank are subpoenaed in Trump finance probe.
  - Nadler says that he will subpoena the unredacted report.
  - Judge Howell rules the foreign company fighting a grand jury subpoena from Mueller is no longer in contempt. Earlier, Mueller transferred the investigatory thread involving the company to the D.C. U.S. Attorney's office. The company, an Egyptian bank, is being investigated as a possible source for the $10 million Trump loaned to his campaign on October 29, 2020.

Report on the Investigation Into Russian Interference in the 2016 Presidential Election (2019) — initial release with redactions by Barr

- April 18:
  - Barr holds a press conference about the special counsel's report, Report on the Investigation into Russian Interference in the 2016 Presidential Election (the Mueller Report). The redacted report was released around 11 A.M. EDT. The report couldn't recommend criminal charges, due to the OLC policy created in the wake of the Watergate scandal saying that a sitting president is unindictable.
  - The Speaker of the House schedules a conference call with the leadership of Congress on whether or not to begin formal impeachment proceedings the following Monday.
- April 19:
  - Nadler issues a subpoena demanding delivery of the full version of the Mueller Report to the House Judiciary Committee by May 1.
  - Politico reports that the 2020 Trump Campaign fired Jones Day, Don McGahn's law firm, at least partly in retaliation over McGahn's cooperation with Mueller. Their new lawyer is Nathan Groth, a former lawyer for Scott Walker and the Republican National Committee (RNC). The campaign claims it is a cost-savings move, and Jones Day declines to comment.
- April 22:
  - Nadler issues a subpoena to McGahn demanding that he provide the House Judiciary Committee with documents by May 7 and testify before the committee on May 21.
  - The House Democratic leadership tells fellow House Democrats in a conference call that House committees will investigate Trump without holding impeachment hearings. The call follows a letter from Pelosi to fellow House Democrats in which she claims the House can hold Trump accountable without impeachment hearings.
  - Trump sues Cummings in attempt to block the House Oversight Chairman's subpoena of longtime accounting firm for the Trump family and businesses, Mazars USA.

Secretary Mnuchin's response to Chairman Neal regarding the production of Trump's tax returns

- April 23:
  - Mnuchin sends Neal a letter expressing "some of the legal concerns" the administration has with his request for Trump's tax returns. He says a decision will not be made on producing the returns until the Treasury Department receives a legal opinion from the Justice Department on May 6. The letter, which reads like a legal brief, calls into question the legality of the request and says it is politically motivated. IRS Commissioner Rettig sends a separate letter to Neal in which he says Justice Department review is "beyond the scope of internal revenue laws," leaving him unsure of what to do. Earlier in the day, White House spokesman Hogan Gidley says the Trump administration will reject requests for Trump's returns because of Trump's claim he is under audit. No law actually prevents tax returns from being released due to an audit, as emphasized by the Commissioner of Internal Revenue.
  - Former White House personnel security director Carl Kline skips a House Oversight Committee hearing on White House security procedures. He was instructed to do so by White House deputy counsel Michael M. Purpura in a letter that says the subpoena issued by the committee ordering Kline to testify "unconstitutionally encroaches on fundamental executive branch interests." Kline's attorney, Robert Driscoll, told the committee that Kline would follow the instructions of the branch of government that employs him. He is currently an employee of the Defense Department, which is part of the executive branch. Chairman Cummings announces that the committee will begin contempt of Congress proceedings against Kline.
  - Manafort transfers to federal prison.
  - Lawyers for Giorgi Rtskhiladze send a letter to Barr demanding a correction to a footnote in the Mueller Report (Volume II, pp. 27–28, footnote 112) that selectively quotes from a text message exchange between Rtskhiladze and Cohen about compromising tapes of Trump from his 2013 visit to Moscow. The letter asserts that the tapes were rumors and provides a screenshot of the text messages in context.
- April 24: Facebook discloses in a quarterly earnings report that it set aside $3 billion to cover legal expenses related to Cambridge Analytica, and that it expects a $3–$5 billion fine from the FTC for its actions involving the firm, though no settlement has been reached.
- April 25: The Privacy Commissioner of Canada and the Information and Privacy Commissioner for British Columbia release a joint report on the findings of their investigation into Facebook's interactions with Cambridge Analytica and the resulting abuses of user privacy. They conclude that Facebook broke Canadian privacy laws and has been uncooperative in finding solutions that would prevent future violations despite the company's public statements to the contrary.
- April 26:
  - Maria Butina is sentenced to 18 months of prison on charges of conspiracy.
  - Senate Intelligence Committee member Marco Rubio tells The New York Times that Russian hackers gained access to a Florida county election system in 2016 and were "in a position" to change voter registration data, but the affected county was never told because it was discovered through an intelligence operation. Rubio says that he can't reveal more because his position on the committee prevents him from sharing classified information.
- April 30: A letter by Mueller objecting to Barr's characterization of his report is leaked to the press.

=== May ===
- May 1:
  - Attorney General Barr testifies before the Senate Judiciary committee on the Mueller Report.
  - Assistant Attorney General Stephen Boyd sends Nadler a letter informing him that the Department of Justice will not provide the House Judiciary Committee with an unredacted copy of the Mueller Report as demanded by a Committee subpoena.
- May 2: Barr fails to appear at a House Judiciary Committee hearing. The Department of Justice informed Nadler the day before that Barr objected to the committee's plan to have committee staff attorneys ask questions. Nadler ends the hearing early with a warning that Barr will be held in contempt of Congress if he does not provide the full Mueller Report and underlying evidence to the committee.
- May 5: Trump tweets "Bob Mueller should not testify".

Secretary Mnuchin Response to Chairman Neal in which he refuses to release Trump's tax returns to Congress

- May 6:
  - Cohen begins his prison sentence.
  - Barr refuses to comply with House subpoena of unredacted Mueller Report. Contempt citation scheduled for 48 hours later.
  - US Treasury Secretary Steven Mnuchin refuses to give Trump's tax returns to the House Ways and Means Committee.
- May 7: CNN reports Mueller tried to block the release of Comey's contemporaneous memos over concerns that Trump and other witnesses would change their stories after reading them.
- May 8:
  - Trump asserts executive privilege over the full, unredacted Mueller Report.
  - The US House Committee on the Judiciary votes to hold US AG Barr in contempt of Congress after he failed to comply with a subpoena ordering him to provide them with the full, unredacted version of the Mueller Report last week. The full House will vote on the measure in the near future.
  - The Senate Intelligence Committee, chaired by Republican Richard Burr, subpoenas Trump Jr. to answer questions about his previous testimony related to the Russia investigation, particularly the Trump Tower Moscow project and his Russian contacts.
- May 9: The New York Times reports that Giuliani and lawyer Victoria Toensing will be traveling to Kyiv within a few days to investigate the origins of the Mueller investigation. He is seeking a meeting with incoming President Zelenskyy to discuss alleged Ukrainian interference in the 2016 presidential election to help Clinton. He tells the Times that he is seeking information that "will be very, very helpful to my client, and may turn out to be helpful to my government." Lev Parnas is helping with the arrangements in Kyiv.
- May 10:
  - It is reported that according to two people briefed, White House officials asked at least twice in the previous month for McGahn to publicly say he never believed the president obstructed justice.
  - House Ways and Means Committee chairman Neal subpoenas Treasury department and IRS for Trump's tax returns.
  - It is reported Trump's personal lawyer Rudy Giuliani is encouraging the government of Ukraine to pursue an investigation into Joe Biden's son Hunter Biden and Hunter's involvement in a gas company Burisma Holdings owned by a Ukrainian oligarch Mykola Zlochevsky to try to discredit Mueller's investigation and undermine the case against Paul Manafort. In September the Trump–Ukraine scandal grows.
  - Giuliani announces that he cancelled his trip to Kyiv amid reports that he is trying to influence the Ukrainian government to help Trump win re-election.
- May 13:
  - Barr appoints U.S. Attorney for the District of Connecticut John Durham to lead an "investigation into the investigators", and any potential criminality that may have occurred in the initiation of the FBI's Crossfire Hurricane investigation and Special Counsel investigations.
  - Richard Pinedo completes his term of imprisonment.
- May 14:
  - Mueller investigation's sentencing for Rick Gates was due, but is postponed due to Gates continuing cooperation, particularly in regards to the Stone trial preparation.
  - Hearing for Trump's bid to block Congress' demand on his financial records from Mazars USA, occurs.
  - Republican Florida Governor Ron DeSantis announces Russians hacked voting databases in two Florida counties prior to the 2016 presidential election and no election results were compromised.
  - Trump Jr. agrees to give "limited" testimony in a private interview in mid-June to the Senate Intelligence Committee.
- May 15: In a letter to House Judiciary Committee chairman Jerry Nadler, White House counsel Pat Cipollone states the White House will not comply with the committee's March 4 letters requesting information and documents, asserting the request was designed "not to further a legitimate legislative purpose, but rather to conduct a pseudo law enforcement investigation on matters that were already the subject of the Special Counsel's long-running investigation and are outside the constitutional authority of the legislative branch."
- May 16:
  - Barr denies he is blocking Mueller's testimony to Congress.
  - U.S. District Judge Emmet G. Sullivan orders the government to make public by May 31 the redacted portions of the Mueller report related to Flynn, transcripts of a 2016 phone call between Flynn and Kislyak, and a voicemail left by Trump's lawyer John M. Dowd for Flynn's lawyer. Sullivan further orders that he be provided with copies of the recordings to review in chambers.
- May 17: Treasury Secretary Steven Mnuchin and IRS Commissioner Charles Rettig defy the May 10 subpoena of Trump's tax returns.
- May 18: Republican U.S. Representative Justin Amash tweets "Few members of Congress have read the [Mueller] report", while becoming the first GOP congressperson calling for Trump's impeachment.
- May 19: It is reported anti-money launders at Deutsche Bank AG recommended in 2016 and 2017 transactions involving Trump and Kushner-controlled entities be reported to a unit of the Treasury Department that polices financial crimes. The report is denied by the Bank that it prevented Trump transactions from being flagged.
- May 20:
  - It is reported Russians linked to 2016 U.S. election interference discussed plans to promote unrest and even violence inside the U.S. as recently as 2018.
  - Judge Amit Mehta of the United States District Court for the District of Columbia rules that accounting firm Mazars USA must comply with a subpoena issued by the House Oversight Committee to turn over Trump's financial records.
  - It is reported Cohen told lawmakers earlier this year that one of Trump's personal attorneys Jay Sekulow told Cohen to lie to Congress by saying the Trump Tower Moscow deal ended nearly six months before they actually ended on January 31, 2016; and suggested he might be pardoned if he helped "shut down" the Russia investigation.
- May 21:
  - House Judiciary subpoenas Hicks and former Deputy White House Counsel Annie Donaldson in regards to their actions during the special counsel investigation.
  - At Trump's direction, McGahn fails to appear at hearing in front of the House Judiciary Committee per subpoena.
  - It is reported that according to a confidential draft legal memo written by IRS staffers the IRS must honor congressional requests for Trump's tax returns unless Trump invokes executive privilege.
  - Trump's former Secretary of State Rex Tillerson met with the House Foreign Affairs Committee in a closed-door private session, during which he talked about his attempts to tackle Russian interference in the 2016 election.
- May 22:
  - The DoJ agrees to provide the House Intelligence Committee with intelligence files from the Mueller investigation.
  - It is reported, per unsealed search warrants, Cohen communicated more than 1,000 times during eight months with the Intrater with ties to Vekselberg, regarding plans to give Flynn a proposal to lift sanctions against Russia.
  - Judge Edgardo Ramos of the SDNY rejected the Trump suit against Deutsche Bank, ruling the bank must comply with congressional subpoenas.
- May 23:
  - Trump orders intelligence community to fully cooperate with Barr's investigation into 2016 surveillance, and granted Barr "full and complete" authority to declassify any classified information pertaining to the investigation.
  - The Justice Department charges Calk with one count of financial institution bribery for offering Manafort a loan in exchange for a position in the Trump administration.
- May 24: The Office of the Comptroller of the Currency bans Calk from involvement with the Federal Savings Bank of Chicago pending the outcome of the bribery charges against him.
- May 29: Mueller addresses the nation on the Russia probe and its results, stating that "If we had had confidence that the President clearly did not commit a crime, we would have said so" and that “the Constitution requires a process other than the criminal justice system to formally accuse a sitting president of wrongdoing,” while also stating his investigation made the "conclusion that there was insufficient evidence to charge" on conspiracy with Russia.
- May 31:
  - Federal prosecutors refuse to comply with a court order to release redacted sections of Mueller report in regards to Flynn and with other relevant materials, saying that they're "unnecessary," and thus Judge Emmet G. Sullivan shouldn't have them.
  - After a year of trying to avoid testimony, Ex-Stone aide Andrew Miller finally testifies before what was the Mueller grand jury.
  - Stone appears in court to get his case dismissed and fails.

=== June ===
- June: The Senate Intelligence Committee refers Trump Jr., Kushner, Bannon, Prince, and Clovis to the DoJ for possible criminal prosecution for giving the committee misleading testimony, including false statements.
- Early June: Steele is interviewed for 16 hours by Michael E. Horowitz-led DoJ Inspector General.
- June 3: House Judiciary committee announces a series of hearings related to the Mueller Report titled "Presidential Obstruction and Other Crimes".
- June 4:
  - Hicks and Donaldson are instructed by the Trump Administration to defy congressional subpoenas.
  - Judge Sullivan rules that the government no longer needs to make public the Flynn-Kislyak transcripts or provide to him the recordings of Flynn, Kislyak and Dowd after prosecutors refused to do so on May 31.
- June 6:
  - Flynn fires Covington & Burling attorneys Robert Kelner and Stephen Anthony, who had negotiated his plea deal.
  - The 2017 audio of the voicemail of former Trump attorney John M. Dowd's voicemail to the lawyer of Flynn was released.
- June 10: House Judiciary committee hearing "Lessons from the Mueller Report: Presidential Obstruction and Other Crimes" is scheduled, with John Dean as a witness.
- June 12:
  - Flynn hires Sidney Powell as his new attorney, who had previously urged him to withdraw his guilty plea.
  - The Senate Intelligence Committee interviews Trump Jr.
- June 13: House Intelligence Committee subpoenas Flynn and Gates.
- June 16: Airing this date, in George Stephanopoulos' 20/20 interview he asks Trump "Your campaign this time around, if foreigners, if Russia, if China, if someone else offers you information on opponents, should they accept it or should they call the FBI?" and Trump suggests he doesn't consider it interference.
- June 19: Hicks testifies before the House Judiciary Committee in closed doors testimony.
- June 24:
  - Regarding a potential violation of the Presidential Records Act, the House Oversight Committee chairman demands notes taken by an aide, present during a meeting between Putin and Trump during the 2017 G20 Hamburg summit which was previously undisclosed.
  - Donaldson and the House Judiciary agree to receive her testimony.
  - Flynn's sentencing is delayed to allow his new lawyer more time to study the case documents.

== See also ==
- Criminal charges brought in the Mueller special counsel investigation
- Foreign interference in the 2020 United States elections
- Russian interference in the 2016 Brexit referendum
- Russian interference in the 2018 United States elections
- Timelines related to Donald Trump and Russian interference in United States elections
- Trump–Ukraine scandal
