= Lyndon B. Johnson judicial appointment controversies =

During President Lyndon B. Johnson's presidency, federal judicial appointments played a central role. Johnson appointed Abe Fortas and Thurgood Marshall to the Supreme Court of the United States in just over five years as president.

In 1965, Johnson nominated his friend, high-profile Washington, D.C. lawyer Abe Fortas, to the Supreme Court, and he was confirmed by the United States Senate. In 1967, Johnson nominated United States Solicitor General Thurgood Marshall to the Supreme Court, and he also was confirmed by the Senate. In 1968, however, Johnson made two failed nominations to the Supreme Court. He nominated Fortas to become Chief Justice to replace the retiring Earl Warren, and he nominated United States Court of Appeals for the Fifth Circuit judge Homer Thornberry to replace Fortas as Associate Justice. However, Johnson wound up withdrawing Fortas's nomination after his confirmation was filibustered by Sen. Robert Griffin (R-MI), and he was not able to make another Chief Justice nomination before his presidency ended. As a result, Warren continued as Chief Justice and Fortas as an Associate Justice, so Johnson also ended up withdrawing Thornberry's nomination. Ultimately, Johnson's successor, President Richard Nixon, appointed Warren E. Burger as Chief Justice of the United States. After Fortas resigned from the Supreme Court, Nixon appointed Harry Blackmun to fill Fortas's seat after his previous nominations of Clement Haynsworth and G. Harrold Carswell to that seat both were voted down by the United States Senate.

At the appellate level, Johnson formally nominated one person, Barefoot Sanders, for a federal appellate judgeship who was never confirmed. The United States Senate did not act on Sanders' nomination before Johnson's presidency ended, and Nixon did not renominate him. Johnson also considered other appeals court nominees whom he never wound up nominating.

== List of failed appellate nominees ==
- United States Court of Appeals for the District of Columbia Circuit
  - Seat - Barefoot Sanders (judgeship later filled by Nixon nominee George MacKinnon) (Sanders later was appointed by President Jimmy Carter to the United States District Court for the Northern District of Texas)

In addition to Sanders, three Johnson nominees to district judgeships were not voted on by the United States Senate before Johnson's presidency ended: David Bress to the United States District Court for the District of Columbia; Cecil F. Poole to the United States District Court for the Northern District of California; and William Byrne to the United States District Court for the Central District of California. Johnson had nominated Sanders, Poole, Bress and Byrne during the 90th United States Congress, and he renominated the four in the 91st United States Congress, right before his presidency ended. However, three days after taking office, Nixon withdrew all four nominations. Nixon later wound up renominating Byrne to the same court in 1971, with Byrne quickly winning Senate confirmation. Poole was renominated by President Gerald Ford to a seat on the same court in 1976, and was quickly confirmed by the Senate.

In Nixon's first news conference after his inauguration, he explained his decision to withdraw the four nominations:

Ramsey Clark discussed this matter during the period and the inauguration with Attorney General Mitchell. He asked Attorney General Mitchell to ask me whether I would object to action on the part of President Johnson in the event that he did submit these appointments to the Senate. My reply was that I would not object to President Johnson's submitting such - submitting names to the Senate...As you ladies and gentlemen are quite aware, I have scrupulously followed the line we have one President at a time and that he must continue to be President until he leaves office on January the 20th. However, I did not have any understanding with the President directly and no one including Attorney General Mitchell as far as I was concerned had any discretion to agree to a deal that those nominations having been made would be approved by me. I have withdrawn them and now I'm going to examine each one of them, and as I've already indicated I have decided that in at least some instances some of the names will be resubmitted.

— Richard Nixon

== Others who were considered for nomination ==
In 1964, Johnson considered nominating either noted civil rights lawyer Bernard Segal or William Thaddeus Coleman, Jr. to fill a vacancy on the United States Court of Appeals for the Third Circuit that had been created by the death of Herbert Funk Goodrich. Johnson personally approached Coleman regarding the nomination, but Coleman declined the offer. Johnson ultimately wound up nominating Abraham Lincoln Freedman to the seat, and he was confirmed quickly by the United States Senate.

In 1968, Johnson had wanted to nominate liberal Republican Sen. Thomas Kuchel to a newly created seat on the United States Court of Appeals for the Ninth Circuit after he lost re-election in his party's primary that year. However, because the judgeship was created while Kuchel was in the Senate, Kuchel was constitutionally barred from being appointed to that seat during the final months of his Senate term (and the final months of Johnson's presidency).

== See also ==
- List of federal judges appointed by Lyndon B. Johnson
- United States federal judge
- Judicial appointment history for United States federal courts
- Francis X. Morrissey
