= David G. Bress =

American lawyer

David G. Bress (1908–1976) was an American lawyer who served as United States Attorney for the District of Columbia from 1965 to 1969. He was nominated by President Johnson for a seat on the United States District Court for the District of Columbia, but the Senate never voted on his nomination.

Bress later served as a defense lawyer for alleged Watergate conspirator Robert Mardian. Shortly after Mardian's trial began, Bress became so ill from cancer that he was unable to continue working, and he was replaced by his assistant Tom Green.

He graduated from University of Virginia and Harvard Law School.
