= Sam Nunberg =

American political operative

- Born: June 21, 1981 (age 45)
- Education: McGill University (BA); Touro Law Center (JD)
- Occupation: Political consultant
- Political party: Republican

Sam Nunberg (born June 21, 1981) is an American public affairs consultant based in Manhattan. He was a political advisor to Donald Trump's 2016 presidential campaign. In March 2018, Nunberg was subpoenaed by a grand jury for testimony and documents relating to the Special Counsel's Russia investigation.

== Early life and education ==
Nunberg was born to a Jewish family; his mother was a corporate attorney at Wachtell, Lipton and his father was a real estate attorney who worked with Trump attorney Gerald Schrager. He attended the Ramaz School an independent co-educational Modern Orthodox Jewish prep school on the Upper East Side of Manhattan. He graduated from McGill University in 2004 with a BA in history, with a senior thesis titled '"Re-Analyzing the Historiography of the Effects of Dollar Diplomacy". While at McGill, he competed globally with the McGill Debating Union. He attended Touro Law Center on Long Island, New York, from 2007 to 2009, graduating in 2009, and was admitted to the New York state bar in 2013.

== Career ==
While volunteering for the Mitt Romney 2008 presidential campaign, Nunberg met and was recruited by attorney Jay Sekulow to volunteer at the American Center for Law & Justice in an attempt to stop the construction of the Park51 mosque. While volunteering there he met political operative Roger Stone, whom he has described as his mentor and "surrogate father".

Nunberg began working for Trump as a political and public affairs consultant in 2011, after Trump decided not to run for president in 2012. Nunberg assisted in the writing of Trump's 2011 speech at the Conservative Political Action Conference.

In February 2014 Nunberg was fired by Trump after he arranged a BuzzFeed interview that was highly critical of Trump; the headline was "36 Hours on The Fake Campaign Trail with Donald Trump." Nunberg was rehired in April 2014 and was Trump's first full time hire for the Donald Trump for President 2016 Campaign; he was let go in December for undisclosed reasons. In February 2015 he was once again rehired by Trump as a communications adviser for the campaign, but was let go shortly thereafter by campaign manager Corey Lewandowski.

Nunberg was rehired for a fourth time by the campaign in April 2015; between then and the beginning of July he was paid $85,139 by the campaign. Nunberg, along with Stone, helped prepare Trump for the first Republican debate, on August 6, 2015. Nunberg left the campaign in August, 2015 after continued tensions with Lewandowski. In March 2016 Nunberg endorsed Senator Ted Cruz for president, saying that Trump "does not have a coherent political ideology."

In July 2016 Trump sued Nunberg for $10 million, accusing Nunberg of violating a confidentiality agreement by leaking information to the New York Post. In a legal response, Nunberg said that Trump might have illegally funneled corporate money into the campaign. Trump and Nunberg settled their legal dispute in August 2016.

== March 2018 subpoena and media appearances ==
Attachment to Nunberg's subpoena from the Mueller investigation

On March 5, 2018, Nunberg spoke to multiple cable news outlets and newspaper reporters without the knowledge of his attorney. He said he had been subpoenaed by a grand jury to testify and provide documents relating to Robert Mueller's Russia investigation, including all his email exchanges with Donald Trump, Roger Stone, and eight other people. He insisted he did not intend to comply with the subpoena, saying "Let him (Mueller) arrest me!" He also had in-person interviews with CNN's Jake Tapper and Erin Burnett and MSNBC's Katy Tur and Ari Melber. He later backtracked, saying that he would cooperate fully with the subpoena, while expressing frustration at the large amount of documentation requested. On March 9, 2018 Nunberg testified before a federal grand jury for more than six hours, saying it was his "duty as an American, whether I like it or not."

Regarding the Mueller investigation, when asked whether he believed that the special counsel may have something on Trump, Nunberg said, "I think they may." He added: "I think that he may have done something during the election. But I don't know that for sure." He also said "I have no knowledge or involvement in Russian collusion or any other inappropriate act" and that: "Donald Trump won this election on his own. He campaigned his ass off. And there is nobody who hates him more than me."

Regarding Trump's former foreign-policy advisor Carter Page, Nunberg said that he believed that Page did collude with the Russians."
