= Tom Green (attorney) =

American defense attorney (born 1941)

Thomas C. Green (born 1941) is an American defense attorney. He has represented American politicians against accusations in highly publicized cases. Clients have included Robert Mardian in the Watergate scandal, several government officials in the Whitewater scandal, Richard V. Secord in the Iran-Contra scandal, Sen. Donald Riegle while under investigations by the Senate Ethics Committee, and former U.S. House Speaker Dennis Hastert against allegations of personal misconduct.

== Early life and career ==
In Green's first major case in 1974, he began by assisting attorney David Bress in the defense of alleged Watergate conspirator Robert Mardian. Shortly after the trial began, Bress fell seriously ill and Green replaced him as the main defense attorney.

Green has been a longtime manager of white-collar criminal defense practice at the law firm Sidley Austin, in Washington D.C.

In 2015, Green served as former House Speaker Dennis Hastert's defense attorney.

It has been reported as of January 2018 that Green represents political consultant Rick Gates in the Mueller probe.
