= David Geovanis =

David Geovanis is a Moscow-based Russian-American businessman. He received attention in 2019 after members of the United States Senate Select Committee on Intelligence (Senate Intel Committee) had sought to interview Geovanis as part of its investigation into Russian interference in the 2016 United States election.

== Personal information ==
Geovanis was born in Brockton, Massachusetts. He received a bachelor's degree in economics from the Wharton School and a Master of Arts in international affairs from the University of Pennsylvania. He became a Russian citizen in 2014.

== Trump-Russia investigation ==
Geovanis has worked closely with Oleg Deripaska, a Russian businessman with strong ties to Russian president Vladimir Putin, and with Paul Manafort, a former head of Donald Trump's 2016 campaign committee.

Geovanis helped organize a 1996 visit by future US-president Donald Trump to Moscow. Trump by that time had been pursuing the goal of building a Trump Tower in Moscow. Geovanis at the time worked for real estate company, the Brooke Group (now Vector Group), owned by Bennett LeBow and Howard Lorber. Both LeBow and Lorber later made large donations to Trump's presidential campaign. Geovanis acted as guide for Trump, showing him the potential building site and the surrounding neighborhoods.

Geovanis was on the board of the Russian power utility UES as it was privatized in 2007–2008. In 2017, after working on several other businesses in Russia, Geovanis again worked for Bennett LeBow's Somerset Coal company.

In February 2019, CNN reported that a witness, in written testimony to the Senate Intel Committee, stated that Geovanis may hold key information showing that the Russian government holds embarrassing photos or other information on President Trump gathered during his 1996 visit.

In 2013, Geovanis described a later incident and intimated he could blackmail Trump:

Mr. Geovanis said that he showed Mr. Trump around Moscow during the Miss Universe pageant in 2013. He did not get into specifics, but intimated that there was partying and that Mr. Trump should be nice to him in light of the information he had.

== See also ==
- Timeline of Russian interference in the 2016 United States elections
- Timeline of investigations into Trump and Russia (2019–2020)
