= Rick Gates (political consultant) =

American political consultant (born 1972)

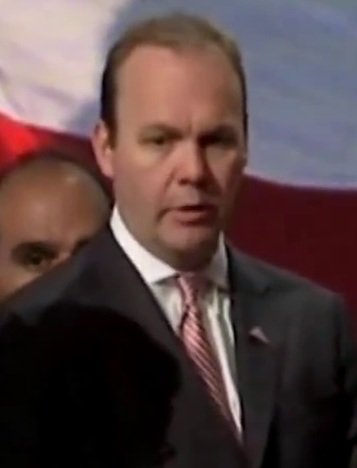
- Gates at the 2016 Republican National Convention
- Born: Richard William Gates III; April 27, 1972 (age 54); Fort Lee, Virginia, U.S.
- Education: College of William and Mary (BA); George Washington University (MPP)
- Political party: Republican
- Criminal charge: Conspiracy against the United States for making false statements in the 2017 Special Counsel investigation
- Criminal penalty: 45 days' imprisonment, 300 hours' community service, $20,000 fine
- Spouse: Sarah Garnett (m. 1995)
- Children: 4

Signature
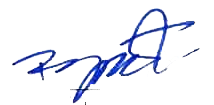

Richard William Gates III (born April 27, 1972) is an American former political consultant and lobbyist who pleaded guilty to conspiracy against the United States for making false statements in the investigation into Russian interference in the 2016 United States elections. He is a longtime business associate of Paul Manafort and served as deputy to Manafort when the latter was campaign manager of the Donald Trump presidential campaign in 2016, and after under Kellyanne Conway.

Gates and Manafort were both indicted in October 2017 on charges related to their consultation work with pro-Russian political figures in Ukraine. Additional charges were filed in District Court for the Eastern District of Virginia on February 21, 2018; these charges were withdrawn on February 27, 2018, without prejudice, as agreed to in his plea bargain with Special Counsel Robert S. Mueller III. On December 17, 2019, Gates was sentenced to 45 days' jail and three years of probation.

== Early life ==
Gates is the son of retired U.S. Army Lieutenant Colonel Richard W. Gates Jr., who is also the founder and CEO of the Gates Group International, a management and information technology firm based in Prince George County, Virginia. An army brat, Gates was born in Fort Lee, Virginia, and lived on several military installations in Kentucky, North Carolina, and Germany as a boy, before his family settled in Prince George, Virginia. After graduating from Prince George High School in 1990, Gates attended the College of William & Mary, earning a degree in government in 1994. Gates was a member of the Sigma Chi fraternity in college. Later, he earned a Master of Public Policy degree from George Washington University.

== Career ==
Early in his career, Gates was appointed to the first class of the Falls Church Fellows program at the Falls Church Anglican, during which he also worked as an intern at the Washington, D.C., consulting firm Black, Manafort, Stone and Kelly. There, he worked with Republican lobbyist Rick Davis, eventually going to work for the two business partners in 2006 at their new consulting firm, Davis Manafort, with an office in Kyiv, Ukraine. Among the clients Gates worked with were Ukrainian president Viktor Yanukovych and Russian oligarch Oleg Deripaska, taking over this work when Davis left the firm in 2008 to work on the presidential campaign of John McCain. Together, they were instrumental in brokering a meeting between McCain and Deripaska in 2006.

In June 2016, when Donald Trump promoted Manafort to the post of campaign manager, Gates worked as Manafort's deputy handling the day-to-day activities of the campaign including taking responsibility for apparent plagiarism in Melania Trump's speech at the Republican National Convention. Gates stayed on as number two in the campaign under Steve Bannon after Manafort was forced to resign, and then worked as deputy chairman of the Donald Trump Inaugural Committee. He helped to form a pro-Trump nonprofit group called America First Policies but was removed from the organization after his involvement with Manafort's overseas ventures was exposed.

After his sentencing, Gates went on to publish a memoir titled Wicked Game: An Insider’s Story on How Trump Won, Mueller Failed, and America Lost. He also founded a political consulting company called Tungsten LLC.

== Russia investigation ==
=== Indictment and arrest ===
Grand jury indictment against Manafort and Gates, unsealed October 30, 2017

Gates' superseding indictment in the Eastern District of Virginia

Rick Gates's felony information

Rick Gates's plea agreement

On October 27, 2017, Gates and Manafort were indicted by a federal grand jury as part of the Special Counsel investigation into Russian interference in the 2016 United States elections and related matters. The twelve-count indictment charged the two men with conspiracy against the United States, making false statements, money laundering, and failing to register as foreign agents for Ukraine as required by the Foreign Agents Registration Act. The charges arose from his work as a consultant for a pro-Russian government in Ukraine and is related to the Trump campaign.

Manafort and Gates surrendered to the FBI on October 30, 2017, and at a court hearing both chose to plead not guilty.

While awaiting trial, Manafort was released on $10 million bond and Gates was released on $5 million bond. Prosecutors described them as flight risks, and as a condition of pretrial release, both men surrendered their passports and were placed under house arrest.

U.S. District Court for the District of Columbia Judge Amy Berman Jackson issued an order on December 22, 2017, demanding that Gates explain why his comments in a brief, videotaped address to the fundraiser held in an Arlington, Va., Holiday Inn, on December 19, did not amount to a violation of the gag order she issued in the case. Of particular concern to Jackson is Gates's involvement with the eccentric Washington-area lobbyist who organized the event, Jack Burkman.

On January 23, 2018, CNN reported that Gates had added white-collar attorney Tom Green to his defense team. The action could relate to a change in strategy, e.g. from a flat not-guilty plea to some kind of cooperation with prosecutors. On February 22, The Daily Beast reported that Gates fired Green, but later corrected its story.

On February 7, 2018, three of Gates's attorneys cited "irreconcilable differences" with their client in court hearing with Judge Amy Berman Jackson in their motion to withdraw as Gates's counsel.

On February 15, 2018, CNN reported that Gates had begun finalizing a plea deal with Special Counsel Robert Mueller's office, indicating he was poised to cooperate in the Special Counsel's investigation, as he had undergone his "Queen for a Day" interview, in which he answered any and all questions from the Special Counsel's team, including about his own case and other potential criminal activity he witnessed or participated in, with the only stipulation being that he could not lie. During this proffer session interview, on February 1, Gates lied to FBI investigators, and this false statement made by Gates was incorporated into the plea bargain that he subsequently entered into.

On February 22, 2018, Mueller revealed new charges in the Manafort and Gates case, filed on February 21. Unlike previous indictments, the superseding indictment was issued by a federal grand jury in the U.S. District Court for the Eastern District of Virginia, and contains 32 counts: 16 counts related to false individual income tax returns, seven counts of failure to file reports of foreign bank and financial accounts, five counts of bank fraud conspiracy, and four counts of bank fraud.

On February 23, 2018, Gates pleaded guilty to one count of false statements and one count of conspiracy against the United States. The plea bargain included an agreement to cooperate with the Mueller investigation. Federal guidelines suggested that Gates would face a sentence of 57 to 71 months. His sentencing date was postponed on multiple occasions, with a March 2019 court filing requesting another sixty day extension, stating Gates "continues to cooperate with respect to several ongoing investigations," suggesting that his cooperation extended beyond matters involving Manafort, who had already been convicted in two courts by that time. On May 13, 2019, prosecutors asked for another extension until August 30, stating that Gates continues to cooperate and referencing the pending trials of Roger Stone and Gregory Craig. He was sentenced in December 2019 to 45 days in jail and three years of probation, though the sentence was suspended in April 2020 due to the COVID-19 pandemic.

Gates was sued by his former attorneys, of Doar Rieck Kaley & Mack, for $368,525.34 in unpaid legal fees.

=== Manafort trials ===
Gates, who struck a plea deal with Federal prosecutors including an agreement to testify against Manafort, became the government's star witness during Manafort's trial. Manafort was convicted of 8 counts of tax and bank fraud. During the trial, Gates testified that he and Manafort carried out an elaborate offshore tax evasion and bank fraud scheme using offshore shell companies and bank accounts in Cyprus, St. Vincent and the Grenadines and the United Kingdom to funnel millions of dollars from their political consulting work in Ukraine. Gates said he concealed the accounts and the income from U.S. tax authorities by disguising the income as loans with falsified bank loan documents. Gates also testified that he embezzled hundreds of thousands of dollars from Manafort, and funded an expensive extramarital relationship with money embezzled from Manafort.

In a February 7, 2019, hearing, prosecutors speculated that Manafort had concealed facts about his activities to enhance the possibility of his receiving a pardon. They said that Manafort's work with Ukraine had continued after he had made his plea deal and that during the Trump campaign, he met with Gates and Konstantin Kilimnik, in an exclusive New York cigar bar. Gates said the three left the premises separately, each using different exits. Kilimnik was indicted by Mueller.

According to prosecutors in the special counsel's office, Gates continued to provide information relevant to multiple "ongoing investigations" after the conclusion of Manafort's federal case in March 2019, and Gates's sentencing has been delayed while that cooperation continues.

=== Deripaska lawsuits ===
Russian oligarch Oleg Deripaska has sued Paul Manafort and Rick Gates for more than $25 million in damages over business deals involving his companies. The complaint filed in a New York state court in 2018 alleges that Manafort and Gates bilked his companies out of millions of dollars given to them to invest. The lawsuit relies, in part, on allegations that were outlined in Special Counsel Robert Mueller's indictments against Manafort and Gates. Deripaska has also made similar claims in previous legal complaints filed against Manafort and Gates in the Cayman Islands in 2014 and in a Virginia state court in 2015 accusing Manafort and Gates of taking $19 million intended for investment then failing to account for the funds or return them.

=== Roger Stone trial ===
On November 12, 2019, Gates testified in the criminal trial of Roger Stone, stating that he witnessed a call between Donald Trump and Stone related to the WikiLeaks website in late July 2016. Although he could not hear what was said, within 30 seconds or so of Trump hanging up, Trump said that "more information would be coming," in an apparent reference to WikiLeaks. On November 15, Stone was found guilty on all seven counts, obstruction of proceedings, five counts of false statements, and one count of witness tampering.

=== Sentencing ===
In December 2019, Federal prosecutors said they would not oppose a sentence of probation, citing his "extraordinary assistance" in cases that led to the convictions of associates of President Donald Trump, even after receiving "pressure not to cooperate ... including assurances of monetary assistance."

On December 17, 2019, Gates was sentenced to three years of probation, 45 days in jail, and 300 hours of community service. He was also ordered to pay a $20,000 fine. The judge took into account years of financial crimes and deception that continued even after he had agreed to plead guilty and cooperate. Gates accepted responsibility and said "I greatly regret the mistakes I have made." before being sentenced.

In April 2020, a U.S. District Judge granted a request for Gates to finish his 45 day sentence at home due to the risk of his wife, who had cancer, contracting the coronavirus if he stayed in jail.

== Personal life ==
In 1995, Gates married Sarah Garnett. They have four children.

== See also ==
- Foreign electoral intervention
- Mueller report
- Links between Trump associates and Russian officials
- Russian interference in the 2016 United States elections
