= Conspiracy against the United States =

Federal crime in the United States

Conspiracy against the United States, or conspiracy to defraud the United States, is a federal offense in the United States of America under 18 U.S.C. § 371. The statute originated under a federal law enacted in 1867 that was codified in the Revised Statutes of the United States in 1874, in a subsequent codification of federal penal statutes in 1909, and ultimately in the United States Code in 1948. The crime is that of two or more persons who conspire to commit an offense against the United States, or to defraud the United States.

== Statute ==
18 U.S.C. § 371 provides that:

If two or more persons conspire either to commit any offense against the United States, or to defraud the United States, or any agency thereof in any manner or for any purpose, and one or more of such persons do any act to effect the object of the conspiracy, each shall be fined under this title or imprisoned not more than five years, or both. If, however, the offense, the commission of which is the object of the conspiracy, is a misdemeanor only, the punishment for such conspiracy shall not exceed the maximum punishment provided for such misdemeanor.

== History and interpretation ==
In the 1924 case Hammerschmidt v. United States, the Supreme Court of the United States, in an opinion authored by Chief Justice William Howard Taft, held that "To conspire to defraud the United States means primarily to cheat the government out of property or money, but it also means to interfere with or obstruct one of its lawful governmental functions by deceit, craft or trickery, or at least by means that are dishonest."

The U.S. Department of Justice's United States Attorneys' Manual, summarizing case law on the statute, states that "In summary, those activities which courts have held defraud the United States under 18 U.S.C. § 371 affect the government in at least one of three ways: (1) They cheat the government out of money or property; (2) They interfere or obstruct legitimate Government activity; or (3) They make wrongful use of a governmental instrumentality." The "intent required for a conspiracy to defraud the government is that the defendant possessed the intent (a) to defraud, (b) to make false statements or representations to the government or its agencies in order to obtain property of the government, or that the defendant performed acts or made statements that he/she knew to be false, fraudulent or deceitful to a government agency, which disrupted the functions of the agency or of the government." The federal courts have held that an "actual loss to the government of any property or funds" is not an element of the offense; to secure a conviction, the government must prove "only that the defendant's activities impeded or interfered with legitimate governmental functions." For example, a businessman who used a front company to gain federal subcontracts for bridge construction meant for disadvantaged businesses was convicted under this section.

The statute has been used in a wide variety of contexts; it is "a common federal charge, mainly because it can target a wide range of conduct and can be tacked on to other charges." Charges of conspiracy against the United States have been brought against al-Qaeda terrorist attack plotters as well as against various Volkswagen AG executives who were charged under the statute in connection with the Volkswagen emissions cheating scandal. Notable persons who have been convicted of conspiracy against the United States include former Enron chief executive officer Jeff Skilling.

In 2018, Donald Trump's campaign chairman, Paul Manafort, and Manafort's associate Rick Gates, were indicted and pleaded guilty to this crime, following an investigation by special counsel Robert Mueller. Gates also pleaded guilty to one count of making false statements, and Manafort also pleaded guilty to one count of witness tampering.

== See also ==
- Cheating the public revenue
