= Timeline of investigations into Donald Trump and Russia (July–December 2018) =

This is a timeline of major events in second half of 2018 related to the investigations into links between Trump associates and Russian officials relating to the Russian interference in the 2016 United States elections. It follows the timeline of Russian interference in the 2016 United States elections before and after July 2016 up until election day November 8, and the transition, the first and second halves of 2017, and the first half of 2018, but precedes that of the first and second halves of 2019, 2020, and 2021. These events are related to, but distinct from, Russian interference in the 2018 United States elections.

== July–December 2018 ==
=== July ===
- July:
  - A warrant is filed targeting Broidy's office in Los Angeles, in order to obtain documents related to his dealings with foreign officials and Trump administration associates, including Gates and George Nader, regarding conspiracy, money laundering, and crimes associated with illegal lobbying on behalf of foreign officials.
  - Mueller's team issues a secret grand jury subpoena for records from a state-owned Egyptian bank. The suboena is part of an investigation into Trump's October 29, 2016, $10 million loan to his campaign.
- July 2: The Washington Post reports that the SEC and the Federal Trade Commission joined the Justice Department's investigation of Facebook. Investigator's questions center around what Facebook knew in 2015 about Cambridge Analytica's use of Facebook's user data and discrepancies in recent statements about the incident.
- July 3:
  Unclassified Summary of Initial Findings on 2017 Intelligence Community Assessment released by the Senate Select Committee on Intelligence
  - The Senate Intelligence Committee releases initial unclassified findings of its in-depth review of the January 2017 Intelligence Community Assessment (ICA). The committee finds the ICA to be "a sound intelligence product."
  - Dana Rohrabacher tells Elex Michaelson in an interview for Fox 11 Los Angeles that the theft of DNC emails was an inside job and not carried out by Russian hackers.
  - U.S. District Court for the District of Columbia Judge Ellen Segal Huvelle dismisses a lawsuit against the Trump campaign because the plaintiffs failed to show the D.C. district court has jurisdiction over the matter. Protect Democracy filed the suit on behalf of Roy Cockrum, Eric Schoenberg, and Scott Comer. It alleges the campaign "entered into an agreement with other parties, including agents of Russia and WikiLeaks, to have information stolen from the DNC publicly disseminated in a strategic way that would benefit the campaign to elect Mr. Trump as President." The plaintiffs refile the lawsuit in the U.S. District Court for the Eastern District of Virginia on July 12.
  - Mueller's team interviews Sarah Sanders for the first of three times.
- July 5: The Daily Beast reports that an unknown person hired bloggers in India and Indonesia to write articles whitewashing ties between Trump, Sater, Tevfik Arif, and Bayrock Group. The campaign appears to have been designed to influence Google Search results.
- July 7: Mueller's team interviews Tad Devine.
- July 10:
  - The U.K. Information Commissioner's Office (ICO) fines Facebook £500,000 for two violations of the Data Protection Act 1998, the maximum fine the Act allows. The ICO found Facebook failed to safeguard user data and wasn't transparent about allowing third parties to harvest user information. The ICO also announces that it is going to criminally prosecute SCL Elections Ltd, the parent of Cambridge Analytica, for refusing to cooperate in the ICO's investigation.
  - Rudolph Giuliani, one of Trump's lawyers, tells The Washington Post that he works for foreign clients while working for Trump. He insists there are no conflicts of interest because his work for Trump is pro bono, and no need to register as a foreign agent because he does not lobby the government, though some lobbying experts disagree.
- July 11: Brian Benczkowski is controversially confirmed as a US Assistant Attorney General and head of the Criminal Division, which is under Rosenstein's purview. Benczkowski has no prosecutorial experience. After working for the Trump transition team, he worked for Alfa-Bank in 2017, defending it against accusations of suspicious contacts with a Trump Organization server in 2016.
- July 12:
  - The White House orders that all members of the House and Senate Intelligence Committees be given access to classified materials related to the FBI informant who contacted Papadopoulos and Page in 2016. Previously, the materials were only made available to the Gang of Eight.
  - Peter Strzok testifies before the House Judiciary and Oversight Committees. During heated questioning, Strzok vigorously defends himself and the integrity of the 2016 FBI investigations into Russian interference in the election and Clinton's email server.

Grand Jury Indicts 12 Russian Intelligence Officers for Hacking Offenses Related to 2016 Election

Indictment of 12 Russian intelligence officers

- July 13:
  - Mueller files an indictment against 12 Russian military intelligence officers in the U.S. District Court for the District of Columbia. The indictment alleges they hacked the Democratic Congressional Campaign Committee, the Democratic National Committee, and the Clinton campaign to steal internal documents, distribute them to the public, and influence the 2016 presidential election. The indictment also alleges three of the officers hacked into election systems and stole many voters' personal information.
  - Leaders of the Maryland legislature reveal that ByteGrid LLC, which operates some of the state's election systems, is owned by Russian oligarch Vladimir Potanin. Potanin's American investment fund, AltPoint Capital Partners, purchased ByteGrid in 2015. Maryland state officials were not notified of the purchase at the time, and were recently informed of it by the FBI.
  - Mueller's team interviews Henry Oknyansky (a.k.a. Henry Greenberg).
  - The Senate Intelligence Committee interviews Lisa Page.

Criminal complaint against Maria Butina

Affidavit supporting the criminal complaint against Maria Butina.

- July 15:
  - Butina is arrested in Washington, D.C., on charges of being an unregistered foreign agent of the Russian Federation working to infiltrate politically influential organizations in the U.S. and influence U.S. officials.
  - Mueller's team interviews Sarah Sanders for the second of three times.
- July 16:
  - The Justice Department announces Butina's arrest and the criminal charges that led to it.
  - NRA spokeswoman Dana Loesch clarifies her May 8 denial of the December 2015 NRA trip to Moscow, telling Mark Follman of Mother Jones that she meant it wasn't an official trip.
  - Trump meets with Putin in Helsinki for two hours with only translators present. At a joint press conference afterward, Trump says in his opening statement, “During today's meeting, I addressed directly with President Putin the issue of Russian interference in our elections.” Putin says in his statement, "...the Russian state has never interfered and is not going to interfere into internal American affairs, including the election process." Jeff Mason from Reuters asks Putin why Americans should believe him. Trump jumps in and talks about his electoral college win and denies collusion with Russia. Putin responds, "As to who is to be believed and to who is not to be believed, you can trust no one, if you take this." Jonathan Lemire from AP asks Trump if he believes Putin or his own intelligence officials on whether Russia interfered in the election. Trump responds by asking about a Pakistani working for the DNC and Clinton's emails, and calls into question the FBI's investigation of hacked DNC servers. He concludes, "So I have great confidence in my intelligence people, but I will tell you that President Putin was extremely strong and powerful in his denial today." Mason also asked Putin, "President Putin, did you want President Trump to win the election and did you direct any of your officials to help him do that?" and Putin responded, "Yes, I did. Yes, I did. Because he talked about bringing the U.S.-Russia relationship back to normal". This exchange is missing from the official transcripts and video of the summit for ten days before being added.
  - The Senate Intelligence Committee interviews Lisa Page for a second time.
- July 17:
  - Prosecutors file an indictment of Butina in the U.S. District Court for the District of Columbia.
  - Rohrabacher tells Politico he is unsure whether he is the U.S. congressman mentioned in the Butina indictment, though he admits to being in Russia in August 2015 and dining with Butina and another congressman. He calls the charges against Butina "bogus" and a function of the "deep state."
  - The Senate Intelligence Committee holds a closed hearing on the White House awareness of and response to Russian active measures.
- July 18:
  - Butina pleads not guilty at a preliminary hearing. The judge orders Butina be held without bail pending trial.
  - The New York Times reports that Trump was shown evidence that Putin personally ordered the 2016 hacking of DNC servers in a January 6, 2017, intelligence briefing.
  - CNN reports that the Secret Service has been blocking the DNC's attempts to serve Jared Kushner with the lawsuit it filed against him in April.
  - Democrats on the House Intelligence Committee interview Simona Mangiante Papadopoulos, George Papadopolous's wife, for four hours. Afterward, she says she was asked about her husband's role in the Trump campaign and her relationship with Joseph Mifsud.
- July 19:
  - The Russian Foreign Ministry calls on people to show their support for Butina by changing their social media avatars to a photo of her, in ‘Free Maria Butina’ campaign.
  - At the Aspen Security Forum, Microsoft's Tom Burt reports that Russians attempted to infiltrate three 2018 midterm congressional candidate campaigns.
  - The Commerce Department grants Rusal America Corporation an exemption from the aluminum tariffs imposed March 8 to import 3,000 metric tons of aluminum billets tariff-free. Rusal America Corporation is a subsidiary of Rusal, which is under sanctions for its financial ties to Deripaska.
- July 20:
  - TMZ reports Kristin Davis is expecting a subpoena from Mueller's team.
  - Alfa-Bank sends a second unsolicited letter to the Senate Intelligence Committee stating that they found no evidence of substantive communications between the bank and the Trump Organization.
- July 23:
  - Senators Ron Wyden, Robert Menendez, and Sheldon Whitehouse send Treasury Secretary Steven Mnuchin a letter demanding the "production of any documents relevant to financial links between the NRA, its associated entities and Ms. Butina and any entities or individuals related to her." The letter is a follow-up to a similar letter Wyden sent Mnuchin in February.
  - After initial denials, a spokesperson for Russian billionaire Konstantin Nikolaev confirms that Nikolaev funded "Right to Bear Arms" from 2012 to 2014.
  - Mueller's team interviews Sarah Sanders for the third of three times.
- July 24: Jury selection in the first Manafort trial begins.
- July 25:
  - Articles of impeachment against Rod Rosenstein are introduced in the House of Representatives by Freedom Caucus members Mark Meadows, Jim Jordan, and nine other cosponsors. The articles say Rosenstein should have recused himself from overseeing the Mueller investigation because he signed the FISA warrant applications for surveilling Carter Page, and accuse Rosenstein of withholding documents from Congress. House speaker Paul Ryan opposes the articles and convinces Meadows and Jordan not to try to force a floor vote.
  - Senator Chuck Grassley asks Gubarev's lawyers in a letter to provide a copy of the Steele deposition to the Senate Judiciary Committee. Steele was deposed in London on June 18 as part of Gubarev's libel suit against BuzzFeed.
- July 26:
  - CNN reports that Cohen claims that Trump was informed by Donald Trump Jr. of the Russians' offer of dirt on Hillary Clinton in advance of the 2016 June 9 meeting with Veselnitskaya, contradicting claims by Trump and Trump Jr. that Trump only learned of the meeting shortly before it was reported by the New York Times in July 2017.
  - The Wall Street Journal reports that longtime Trump Organization finance executive Allen Weisselberg has been subpoenaed to testify before a federal grand jury in Cohen's ongoing criminal investigation.
  - The Daily Beast reports that Senator Claire McCaskill's reelection campaign was targeted by Fancy Bear for a phishing attack in August 2017. This is the first 2018 midterm campaign publicly identified as a Russian hacking target.
  - The New York Times reports that Mueller is examining Trump's tweets about Sessions and Comey as part of his search for possible evidence of obstruction of justice.
  - Graphika CEO John Kelly, Director of Research at New Knowledge Renee DiResta, and Oxford Internet Institute researcher Phil Howard testify before the Senate Intelligence Committee in a closed briefing on social media manipulation.
- July 27: The Senate Intelligence Committee interviews Mark Burnett.

"Disinformation and ‘fake news’: Interim Report" by the Digital, Culture, Media and Sports Committee

- July 28: The U.K. Digital, Culture, Media and Sport Committee releases its interim report on disinformation and "fake news". The report's topics include the activities of Cambridge Analytica, SCL, Facebook, Russia, and the Leave.EU campaign.
- July 30:
  - Devin Nunes tells the audience at a fundraiser for Representative Cathy McMorris Rodgers that the Rosenstein impeachment effort is on hold until after Supreme Court nominee Brett Kavanaugh is voted on by the Senate. He says that if the House votes to impeach Rosenstein, the Senate will have to drop everything, including consideration of Kavanaugh, until they vote on the impeachment, and putting Kavanaugh on the Supreme Court is more important than removing Rosenstein. Nunes also tells the audience that it is illegal for a candidate to use stolen emails in their campaign. The fundraiser is a private event that excludes the press, but an attendee secretly records Nunes's comments and gives the recording to MSNBC's The Rachel Maddow Show.
  - The Senate Intelligence Committee interviews someone whose name is redacted from volume 5 of their report on Russian interference.
- July 31:
  - Paul Manafort's trial for bank and tax fraud charges starts in Alexandria, Virginia.
  - Facebook announces they have shut down eight pages, 17 profiles, and seven Instagram accounts related to "bad actors" identified recently with activity profiles similar to the IRA. The company says it doesn't have enough information to attribute the accounts, groups, and events to the IRA, but that a known IRA account was briefly an administrator of the "Resisters" group. The "Resisters" group was the first organizer on Facebook of the upcoming "No Unite The Right 2 – DC" protest scheduled in Washington, D.C., for August 10. Some of the event's other organizers insist they started organizing before "Resisters" created the event's Facebook page.
  - Andrew Miller, a former associate of Roger Stone, loses his attempt to challenge a subpoena from Mueller by asserting Mueller's appointment was unconstitutional. U.S. District Court for the District of Columbia Chief Judge Beryl A. Howell rules Mueller's appointment was constitutional and that the subpoena is therefore valid and Miller must appear "at the earliest date available to the grand jury, and to complete production of the subpoenaed records promptly."

=== August ===
- August 1:
  - CNN reports that over the past few months Mueller referred three people and their firms to the U.S. Attorney for the SDNY for further investigation into failing to register as lobbyists for a foreign government. The referrals include Tony Podesta, former U.S. Representative Vin Weber (MN-R), and former Obama White House counsel Greg Craig. Manafort paid all three, and their firms, through the European Centre for a Modern Ukraine to lobby on behalf of the Ukrainian government. Craig worked at the same firm as Alex van der Zwaan.
  - Trump makes a series of tweets related to Manafort, including calling for Sessions to end the Mueller investigation immediately and complaining that Manafort is being treated worse than Al Capone. His tweets are widely reported in the press, and, in 2019, the Mueller Report cites them as evidence of attempted jury tampering.
  - The Senate votes to allow the Senate Intelligence Committee to share the transcript of Butina's testimony before the committee with the prosecutorial and defense teams in her criminal case.
  - Mueller's team interviews Kristin M. Davis.
  - The Senate Intelligence Committee sends Assange an invitation to testify before the committee.
  - DiResta, Graphika CEO John Kelly, and then German Marshall Fund expert Laura Rosenberger testify before the Senate Intelligence Committee in an open hearing on foreign influence campaigns on social media. Kelly tells the committee that Russian automated accounts produce 25–30 times as many far left and far right message as legitimate political accounts.
- August 2:
  - Sanders, Bolton, Coats, Nielsen, Wray, and Nakasone hold a White House news briefing that confirms that Russia interfered in US elections and that the threat is real.
  - Mueller's team interviews Petr Aven.
  - Mueller's team interviews White House Chief of Staff John Kelly.
- August 3:
  - Lawyers for Concord Management and Consulting ask District Court Judge Dabney Friedrich to declare Mueller's appointment invalid. When Friedrich says she should follow Supreme Court precedent, lawyer James Martin asks her to "be brave" and ignore it.
  - U.S. District Judge George B. Daniels dismisses Rod Wheeler's August 1, 2017, lawsuit against Fox News, writing that the inaccurate quotes in the Fox article didn't meet the legal standard for false.
- August 5: In a tweet, Trump admits publicly for the first time that the June 2016 Trump Tower meeting was about getting dirt on Hillary Clinton.
- August 6: Politico reports that almost all of the money contributed to The Patriot Legal Expense Fund Trust, the legal fund established in February to help Trump campaign, transition, and White House aides, came from four donors closely linked to Trump.
- August 7:
  - Senator Elizabeth Warren sends Secretary of Commerce Wilbur Ross a letter inquiring about the details of the exemption to aluminum tariffs granted to Rusal America Corporation on July 19. Rusal America Corporation is a subsidiary of Rusal, which is under sanctions for its financial ties to Deripaska.
  - Mueller's team interviews Cohen for the first time.
- August 8:
  - The Hill reports the White House is drafting an executive order allowing the president to impose sanctions on "10 of the 30 largest businesses" in a country whose nationals are found to have meddled in U.S. elections.
  - The Commerce Department reverses its decision to grant an aluminum tariffs exemption to Rusal America Corporation a day after Senator Warren inquired about the exemption. The department claims the original grant was a clerical error.
  - The Senate Intelligence Committee interviews Leon Black.
- August 9:
  - The Hill reports House Judiciary Committee Chairman Bob Goodlatte is preparing subpoenas for people connected to the Steele dossier, including Nellie and Bruce Ohr, Glenn Simpson, and former FBI and DOJ officials Jim Baker, Sally Moyer, Jonathan Moffa, and George Toscas.
  - The Daily Beast reports that Igor Pisarky, the founder and chairman of the Russian public relations firm R.I.M. Porter Novelli, was Butina's point of contact for the funding she received from billionaire Konstantin Nikolaev.
- August 10:
  - Judge Howell rules Andrew Miller is in contempt of court for refusing to appear before one of Mueller's grand juries. Howell stays the contempt order to allow an appeal to proceed. After the closed hearing, Miller's lawyer Paul Kamenar says he asked the court for the contempt ruling so that he can file an appeal challenging the legality of the Mueller investigation. Miller's challenge is being funded by the National Legal and Policy Center because, they say, they share his concerns about the constitutionality of the Mueller investigation.
  - Rick Davis appears before one of Mueller's grand juries.
  - Randy Credico's lawyer says Credico is scheduled to appear before Mueller's grand jury on September 7.
  - DNC lawyers use Twitter to serve WikiLeaks with the lawsuit it filed in April.
  - The Senate Intelligence Committee interviews Michael Glassner.
- August 13:
  - FBI Deputy Director David Bowdich overrules the recommendation of the Office of Professional Responsibility (OPR) and fires FBI agent Peter Strzok for violating bureau policies. The OPR had recommended demotion and a 60-day suspension. The firing contradicts FBI Director Christopher Wray's assurances to Congress that the FBI would follow its regular processes. Trump heralds the firing on Twitter.
  - Judge Friedrich rules that Mueller's appointment was constitutional. The ruling is in response to a motion lawyers for Concord Management and Consulting made on August 3 to dismiss Mueller's charges against the company.
- August 15: Trump strips former CIA director John O. Brennan of his security clearance.
- August 16:
  - In an interview with the Wall Street Journal, Trump connects his revoking of John Brennan's security clearance to the Russia investigation.
  - Former CIA Director John O. Brennan, commenting on the reason his credentials were revoked by Trump, stated that Trump's claims of no collusion were "hogwash": "The only questions that remain are whether the collusion that took place constituted criminally liable conspiracy, whether obstruction of justice occurred to cover up any collusion or conspiracy, and how many members of 'Trump Incorporated' attempted to defraud the government by laundering and concealing the movement of money into their pockets."
  - Manafort's Virginia trial sends the case to the jury to begin deliberations.
  - Steele provides a tranche of written answers to the Senate Intelligence Committee.
- August 17:
  - Mueller files a sentencing memorandum for George Papadopoulos in the U.S. District Court for the District of Columbia, arguing that Papadopoulos's concealment of information in January 2017 prevented the FBI from effectively confronting Mifsud in February and potentially arresting him before he left the United States. Mueller recommends Papadopoulos be incarcerated for up to six months and fined up to $9,500. He says Papadopoulos agreed to the fine, but has not been very cooperative and only volunteered information when confronted with evidence.
  - In an impromptu exchange with reporters on the South Lawn of the White House, Trump praises Manafort and attacks his prosecution and the Mueller investigation. In 2019, the Mueller Report cites his remarks as evidence of attempted jury tampering because they occurred during jury deliberations.
  - The Senate Intelligence Committee interviews Brittany Kaiser.
- August 18: The New York Times reports that White House Counsel Don McGahn gave Mueller over 30 hours of voluntary testimony over the past nine months.
- August 20: Judge Anthony C. Epstein of the Superior Court of the District of Columbia throws out a libel suit the founders of Alfa-Bank filed on April 16 against Steele and his company, Orbis Business Intelligence. The case is dismissed with prejudice in response to a motion by lawyers for Orbis Business Intelligence.
- August 21:
  Michael Cohen's plea agreement
  Michael Cohen charging documents
  - Cohen pleads guilty in US District Court for the SDNY to five counts of tax evasion, one count of bank fraud and two counts related to campaign finance law violations. Cohen says he paid Stormy Daniels "at the direction of" Donald Trump for the purpose of "influencing the election".
  - Paul Manafort is convicted on eight of eighteen counts in his first trial. He is found guilty of filing false tax returns for years 2010 through 2014, defrauding Citizens Bank and Banc of California, and failing to declare a foreign bank account. The jury was deadlocked on the other 10 charges.
  - Facebook announces that it has taken down hundreds of pages since July involving disinformation campaigns originating in Russia and Iran. Among the pages removed is the GRU-linked "Inside Syria Media Center" fake news outlet.
  - Nunes is in London trying to meet with MI5, MI6, and GCHQ to get information on Steele and his interactions with Bruce Ohr. The agencies decline to meet with Nunes because they are concerned he is "trying to stir up a controversy." Nunes does meet with U.K. deputy national-security adviser Madeleine Alessandri.
- August 22:
  - In an interview with Ainsley Earhardt broadcast the next day on Fox & Friends, Trump praises Manafort for not flipping. In 2019, the Mueller Report cites his statements as evidence of Trump encouraging Manafort not to cooperate with the government.
  - In an interview, Giuliani says that Trump feels Manafort was horribly treated. He says they discussed the potential political fallout over giving Manafort a pardon, but he is not considering one. After the interview, Sanders tells the press that a pardon for Manafort was "not something that's been up for discussion."
- August 23:
  - Scientists at George Washington University report that the IRA used Twitter to sow discord about the safety of vaccines.
  - The Wall Street Journal and Vanity Fair report that federal prosecutors for the SDNY granted immunity from prosecution to American Media Inc.'s chairman and CEO David Pecker and chief content officer Dylan Howard in exchange for their cooperation. In the Cohen charging documents, Pecker is identified as "Chairman-1," American Media Inc. as "Corporation-1", its publication National Enquirer as "Magazine-1", and Howard as "Editor-1".
  - Giuliani tells The Washington Post that, in the previous weeks, Trump discussed issuing pardons for Manafort and others targeted by the Mueller investigation, but he and Sekulow convinced Trump to wait for the Mueller report before issuing any.
  - Reality Winner is sentenced to five years in federal prison after pleading guilty in 2017 to giving The Intercept a top-secret document on Russian hackers targeting U.S. election systems.
- August 24: The Wall Street Journal reports that federal prosecutors in New York granted immunity from prosecution to Trump Organization CFO Allen Weisselberg in exchange for his cooperation. Weisselberg is identified as "Executive-1" in the Cohen charging document.
- August 27:
  - The Wall Street Journal reports that Manafort's legal team started plea discussions with Mueller's team before Manafort's first trial ended. The discussions fell apart because of objections from Mueller.
  - Digital Culture, Media and Sport Committee chair Damian Collins and Labour party deputy leader Tom Watson call for a Mueller-style investigation of likely Russian interference in the 2016 Brexit referendum. Collins says his committee's investigation was limited in scope by its jurisdiction, and other government watchdog agencies suffer from similar limitations, preventing a full accounting of Russia's influence on the referendum.
- August 28:
  - Trump tweets that China hacked Clinton's email server.
- August 29
  - In response, the FBI issues a brief statement that says, "The FBI has not found any evidence the servers were compromised."
  - CNN reports that the US Attorney's Office for the SDNY rejected a request from a second Trump Organization employee for an immunity deal.
  - Trump announces that McGahn will leave the White House in the fall.
  - Trump tweets that Chief Justice of the United States John G. Roberts should tell the head of FISA Court Rosemary M. Collyer to question FBI and Justice Department officials about their use of the Trump-Russia dossier as part of a collusion probe, with particular focus on Ohr.
  - Papadopoulos decides not to withdraw from his plea deal with Mueller.
- August 30
  - Trump claims that NBC's Lester Holt altered the recording of their interview on May 11, 2017, in which Trump stated the Russia investigation played a role in his decision to fire Comey. Trump provides no evidence to support his assertion.
  - D.C. Circuit Court of Appeals Judges David Tatel and Thomas Griffith deny a request from lawyers for Concord Management and Consulting to join Andrew Miller's appeal. The judges rule that while they are both challenging the constitutionality of Mueller's appointment, the facts in their cases are too different to warrant combining their appeals. The judges further rule that Concord can file an amicus brief.
  - Mueller's team interviews David Klein.
- August 31:
  Samuel Patten statement of the offense
  - Sam Patten, a lobbyist and associate of Paul Manafort, pleads guilty in Washington D.C. to failing to register as a foreign lobbyist. The case was referred by the Special Counsel. As part of his plea deal, Patten agrees to work with Mueller's office. Patten's company received more than $1 million for its Ukraine work from 2015 to 2017, and helped his foreign client pay $50,000 to Trump's inaugural committee. In the statement of the offense, Konstantin Kilimnik is identified as "Foreigner A", his and Patten's company Begemot Ventures International as "Company A", and Serhiy Lyovochkin as "Foreigner B".
  - The first major documentary to address the allegations of collusion between the Trump campaign and agents of the Russian state timeline, Active Measures is distributed, both in theaters and digitally.

=== September ===
- September: The U.S. Attorney's office in Washington, D.C., sends Paul Erickson a letter informing him that it is considering bringing charges against him for secretly acting as a foreign agent and a possible additional charge for conspiracy.
- September 4: The New York Times reports that Mueller's office told Trump's legal team in a letter that Mueller would accept written answers from Trump to questions about whether his campaign conspired with Russia to interfere in the 2016 U.S. elections.
- September 5:
  - Roger Stone associate Jerome Corsi receives a subpoena to appear before Mueller's grand jury on September 7.
  - Facebook COO Sheryl Sandberg and Twitter CEO Jack Dorsey appear before the Senate Intelligence Committee to testify on their companies' efforts to combat fake news and the manipulation of their platforms heading into the midterm elections.
  - The Daily Beast reports that the GRU-linked "Inside Syria Media Center" fake news outlet is actively posting content on the Facebook page "Oriental Review" after being banned from Facebook two weeks earlier.
  - Magistrate Judge John J. O'Sullivan denies a request that he order Gubarev's lawyers to give a copy of the Steele deposition to the Senate Judiciary and House Intelligence Committees.
  - Mueller's team interviews Jason Fishbein, the lawyer who sent WikiLeaks the password to a website critical of Trump.
- September 6:
  - Corsi meets with Mueller's team for the first time. His grand jury appearance is put on indefinite hold.
  - Mueller's team interviews Patten.
- September 7:
  - Randy Credico testifies before Mueller's grand jury.
  - Papadopoulos is sentenced to 14 days in jail, one year of supervised release, 200 hours of community service, and a $9,500 fine for lying to the FBI.
  - Bloomberg reports that federal prosecutors in Manhattan are investigating possible campaign finance law violations by executives at the Trump Organization.
  - Bloomberg reports that Manafort is negotiating a plea deal with federal prosecutors for the charges in his upcoming trial.
- September 9: Papadopoulos tells George Stephanopoulos on ABC's "This Week with George Stephanopoulos" that he lied to the FBI in January 2016 to protect Trump from possible incrimination.
- September 10:
  - Papadopoulos posts a series of Twitter messages questioning Australian ambassador Alexander Downer's motivations for contacting him in London in May 2016. He suggests Downer was probing him on his business interests in Israel on behalf of Clinton, MI6, or private intelligence agencies.
  - The Daily Beast reports that Erickson is under investigation by the FBI and the U.S. attorney in South Dakota for fraudulently seeking $100,000 investments at conservative political events to fund North Dakota companies allegedly involved in the Bakken oil fields.
- September 11: Mueller's team interviews Manafort.
- September 12:
  - BuzzFeed News reports that federal investigators are examining suspicious bank transactions involving accounts controlled by the Agalarov family a few days after the Trump Tower meeting and a few days after the 2016 election.
  - Trump issues an executive order authorizing sanctions against individuals and governments who interfere in the upcoming 2018 U.S. elections. It covers meddling with election infrastructure and attempts to influence voting from outside the country. The order is seen as an effort to forestall bipartisan legislation that would mandate tougher actions.
  - ABC News reports that Manafort is attempting to negotiate a plea deal to avoid his upcoming trial, but refuses to accept a clause requiring cooperation with Mueller's investigation.
  - The U.S. Senate votes to share the transcript of the Senate Intelligence Committee's closed-door interview of Sam Patten with the prosecutors in Manafort's second trial.
  - The Wall Street Journal reports that nearly 600 IRA Twitter accounts posted nearly 10,000 mostly conservative-targeted messages about health policy and Obamacare from 2014 through May 2018. Pro-ObamaCare messages peaked around the spring of 2016 when Senator Bernie Sanders and Hillary Clinton were fighting for the Democratic Party presidential nomination. Anti-Obamacare messages peaked during the debates leading up to the attempted repeal of the Affordable Care Act in the spring of 2017.
  - Mueller's team interviews Cohen for the second time.
  - Mueller's team interviews Manafort.
- September 13: Mueller's team interviews Manafort.
- September 14:
  Paul Manafort plea agreement
  Paul Manafort statement of the offense and other acts
  - Paul Manafort pleads guilty to conspiracy against the United States to money launder, commit tax fraud, violate the Foreign Agents Registration Act, lie to the U.S. Department of Justice, and obstruct justice by tampering with witnesses. As part of the plea deal, he also agrees to cooperate with the Mueller investigation. In the statement of the offense, Alan Friedman is identified as "Person D1", Eckart Sager as "Person D2", Mercury Public Affairs as "Company A", Podesta Group as "Company B", FBC Media as "Company D", Aleksander Kwaśniewski as "former Polish President", Hillary Clinton as "senior Cabinet official", Avigdor Lieberman as "senior Israeli Government Official", Dana Rohrabacher as "Member of Congress", and the firm Skadden, Arps, Slate, Meagher & Flom as "Law Firm A".
  - Vanity Fair reports that Cohen has been talking to Mueller's team.
  - Giuliani tells Hannity on his Fox News show that he has inside information indicating that Manafort's plea and cooperation agreements have nothing to do with the Trump campaign.
- September 17:
  - The White House announces that Trump ordered declassification of a large number of classified documents, including 21 pages of an application for a renewed FISA warrant against former campaign aide Carter Page, all FBI interviews related to the warrant application, and text messages from FBI agents Ohr, Peter Strzok and Lisa Page, as well as former FBI director Comey and former FBI deputy director McCabe, in another attempt to discredit the FBI and the Mueller investigation. According to David S. Kris, "The release of FISAs like this is off the charts" in the degree to which it is unprecedented.
  - Mueller's team submits written questions to Trump, including questions about the Trump Tower Moscow project, and attach the project's letter of intent signed by Trump and Cohen's written statement to Congress.
  - Mueller's team interviews Corsi.
- September 18: Mueller's team interviews Cohen for the third time.
- September 19:
  - NPR reports that beginning in 2014, Maria Butina urged Americans to hold gun rights demonstrations.
  - U.S. District Judge Emmet Sullivan schedules Michael Flynn's sentencing hearing for December 18. The sentencing is for Flynn's December 2017 plea agreement.
  - Trump tells TheHill.com he ordered the declassification on the urging of the "great Lou Dobbs, the great Sean Hannity, the wonderful, great Jeanine Pirro."

American Media Inc. Non-Prosecution Agreement

- September 20:
  - American Media, Inc., enters into a non-prosecution agreement with federal prosecutors in the SDNY for cooperation into the investigation of a $150,000 payment it made to Karen McDougal in concert with the Trump campaign. The deal requires cooperation for three years, though it does not cover prosecution for any associated tax liabilities. The agreement is kept under seal and revealed by prosecutors on December 12.
  - Butina's lawyers issue a subpoena to American University demanding "[a] copy of each class roster (and photo roster, if one) for each of Maria Butina’s courses at American University."
- September 21:
  - After receiving push-back from foreign allies over his September 17 declassification order, Trump walks it back and says the Justice Department Inspector General will review the documents instead.
  - The New York Times reports that confidential memos McCabe wrote in early 2017 show that Rosenstein talked of secretly recording the chaos he observed in the White House and discussed the possibility of invoking the 25th amendment to remove Trump from office. Rosenstein disputes the accuracy of The New York Times article.
  - Corsi is interviewed by Mueller's team and testifies before Mueller's grand jury. Corsi's participation in this and subsequent interviews by Mueller's team are made under a proffer agreement limiting the use of his statements against him.
  - BuzzFeed News reports that Mueller is investigating a series of transfers totaling $3.3 million made by Aras Agalarov's Crocus Group to Kaveladze before and after the Trump Tower meeting. The report triggers U.S. banks to close a number of Crocus's accounts within a few weeks. The report also leads to the arrest of Natalie Edwards on October 17 for leaking FinCEN data.
- September 22:
  - The Washington Post reports that K. T. McFarland changed her statement to the FBI shortly after Flynn's guilty plea in December 2017. Her new statement says a general statement made by Flynn may have indicated he discussed sanctions with Kislyak on December 29, 2016. Her previous statement to the FBI, made in the summer of 2017, denied any knowledge of Flynn and Kislyak discussing sanctions. Court documents filed with Flynn's guilty plea refer to contemporaneous emails between Flynn and McFarland that show they discussed the contents of Flynn's conversations with Kislyak. McFarland's inconsistent statements scuttled her nomination to be the ambassador to Singapore.
  - The Daily Beast reports that the U.K. implored Trump not to release unredacted copies of Page's FISA warrants and related intelligence documents.
- September 24: The New Yorker reports that election researcher Kathleen Hall Jamieson's nonpartisan analysis of the 2016 presidential debates, campaigns, opinion polls, targeted advertising by Russians, and the Russian and WikiLeaks' dumps of Clinton and DNC confidential campaign materials leads to the conclusion that Russia's interference most likely swayed enough of the electorate for Trump to win the election.
- September 25: The New York Times reports that the Moscow-based news website "USAReally.com" appears to be a continuation of the IRA's fake news propaganda efforts targeting Americans. The site, launched in May, has been banned from Facebook, Twitter, and Reddit. A new Facebook page created by the site is being monitored by Facebook.
- September 27: Mueller's team interviews Gates.
- September 28: The House Intelligence Committee votes to declassify 53 witness testimonies. The Republican-majority committee also votes along party lines not to release the transcripts of the testimony of Rohrabacher, Debbie Wasserman Schultz, Comey, Brennan, and Rogers. Chairman Nunes refuses to answer when asked by Representative Mike Quigley whether the votes' timing was influenced by the White House or the president's legal team.

=== October ===
- October 1: Mueller's team interviews Manafort.
- October 2: The Senate Intelligence Committee interviews former FBI general counsel James Baker.
- October 3:
  - Kathleen Hall Jamieson publishes Cyberwar: How Russian Hackers and Trolls Helped Elect a President; What We Don't, Can't, and Do Know, a book that gives a detailed, nonpartisan analysis of how Russian activities likely swayed the 2016 election to Trump.
- October 4:
  - Russian Deputy Attorney General Saak Albertovich Karapetyan, a close associate of Natalia Veselnitskaya, the lawyer who met senior Trump campaign officials in 2016, dies in a helicopter crash.
  - The U.S. Justice Department announces the indictment of seven GRU officers for cybercrimes including hacking into the World Anti-Doping Agency and leaking the test results of prominent athletes. Four of the officers were among the 12 GRU officers indicted by the Mueller investigation in July. The indictment alleges the GRU took the actions in retaliation for Russian athletes being banned from the 2016 Olympics in Rio de Janeiro.
  - The Daily Beast reports that Brittany Kaiser, the former director of business development at Cambridge Analytica, will be interviewed by House Intelligence Committee Democrats, and that she previously testified before the Senate Intelligence Committee.
- October 5–6: Deripaska aide and former Russian intelligence officer Commander Viktor A. Boyarkin confirms to TIME magazine that he was in communication with Manafort during his time working for the Trump campaign in order to collect the debts Manafort owes to Deripaska.
- October 8: The New York Post reports Deripaska's New York City mansion has been frozen alongside all of his U.S. assets.
- October 10:
  - Richard Pinedo is sentenced to six months in prison followed by six months of home confinement and 100 hours of community service for selling bank account numbers to the IRA.
  - Mueller's team interviews Gates.
- October 11:
  - The Trump campaign argues in a court filing that WikiLeaks cannot be held liable for publishing stolen emails because it is a passive publishing platform like Google or Facebook. It further argues WikiLeaks is not part of a conspiracy because publishing the emails was not illegal.
  - Mueller's team interviews Manafort.
- October 15: Politico reports that Anthony Lomangino, a recycling mogul, major Republican campaign contributor, and Mar-a-Lago member, gave $150,000 to the Patriot Legal Expense Trust Fund.

- October 17:
  - Natalie Mayflower Sours Edwards, a senior official at the Treasury Department's Financial Crimes Enforcement Network (FinCEN), is accused of leaking confidential banking reports of suspects charged in the Mueller probe.
  - Mueller's team interviews Cohen for the fourth time.
  - Mueller's team interviews Robert Foresman, the investment banker who offered his services to the Trump campaign as a backdoor intermediary with Putin.
- October 18: Bloomberg reports that Mueller's preliminary report will be out just after the November 6 elections.

United States of America v. Elena Alekseevna Khusyaynova criminal complaint

- October 19:
  - The US Justice Department charges 44-year old Russian accountant Elena Alekseevna Khusyaynova of Saint Petersburg with conspiracy to defraud the United States by managing the finances of the social media troll operation, including the IRA, that attempted to interfere with the 2016 and 2018 US elections.
  - "USAReally.com" disputes the allegations against Khusyaynova and describes her as the chief financial officer of the USA Really news agency and its parent, the Federal News Agency.
  - The Senate Intelligence Committee interviews hedge fund manager Rick Gerson.
- October 22: Giuliani tells Reuters that he had spoken with Manafort's lawyer Kevin Downing several times since Manafort's plea agreement. He says the discussions were held under Manafort's joint defense agreement with Trump, and that Manafort isn't telling Mueller anything that incriminates Trump.
- October 25:
  Transcript of the House Judiciary and Oversight Committees joint interview of George Papadopoulos (redacted)
  - Mueller's team interviews Gates.
  - The House Judiciary and Oversight Committees jointly interview Papadopoulos.
- October 26: Mueller's team interviews Bannon for the third time.
- October 29:
  - The Senate Intelligence Committee interviews Anthony Scaramucci.
  - Mueller's team interviews Gates.
- October 30: Mueller spokesman Peter Carr announces, "When we learned last week of allegations that women were offered money to make false claims about the special counsel, we immediately referred the matter to the FBI for investigation." The week before, bloggers and journalists received an email claiming to be from a woman who was offered $30,000, and other benefits, by radio host Jack Burkman to make false allegations about Mueller.
- October 31: Mueller's team interviews Corsi for the fourth time. The interview is conducted under a proffer agreement.

=== November ===
- November 1: Mueller's team interviews Corsi. The interview is conducted under a proffer agreement.
- November 2:
  - The Daily Beast reports that the Senate Intelligence Committee asked the NRA for documents related to its connections to Russia, including the December 2015 Moscow trip.
  - Mueller's team interviews Corsi.Mueller's team interviews Corsi. The interview is conducted under a proffer agreement.
- November 5: The Senate Intelligence Committee interviews former CEO of Rosneft Peter O'Brien.
- November 6:
  ICO report: Investigation into the use of data analytics in political campaigns
  - Midterm elections: Democrats take the House of Representatives. Republicans pick up seats in the Senate.
  - The New York Times reports that Mueller has acquired communications between Arron Banks and Russian diplomats.
  - The Information Commissioner's Office releases its final report on Cambridge Analytica, titled "Investigation into the use of data analytics in political campaigns". The commissioner found Cambridge Analytica would have received a substantial fine if it were still in business, and that it "unfairly process[ed] people’s personal data for political purposes, including purposes connected with the 2016 U.S. presidential campaigns." It said the company "nimbly" evaded the few restrictions Facebook imposed on acquiring user data. The commissioner also found that Cambridge Analytica and Leave.EU never reached an agreement to work together even though an executive appeared with Leave.EU officials at a press conference.

Jeff Sessions' resignation letter

- November 7:
  - Sessions resigns as attorney general at Trump's request. Trump replaces him with Matthew Whitaker. Ordinarily the deputy attorney general, in this case Rosenstein, would become acting attorney general in case of a vacancy.
  - Mueller's team interviews Gates.
- November 8
  - Oral arguments are heard in Andrew Miller's case in the U.S. Court of Appeals for the District of Columbia.
  - Thousands across the United States march to protest the firing of Sessions, who recused himself from Mueller's investigation. Whitaker's appointment was also protested, as Whitaker said he would not recuse himself.
- November 12: Mueller's team interviews Cohen for the fifth time.
- November 13: Corsi tells The Guardian that Mueller's team questioned him about Farage and Ted Malloch two weeks earlier.
- November 14:
  - NBC News reports that through Assange's attorney Margaret Ratner Kunstler, the widow of William Kunstler, Randy Credico knew on August 27, 2016, that Wikileaks would release information about the Clinton campaign in the near future and texted Roger Stone that "Julian Assange has kryptonite on Hillary." Credico continued to give Stone updates on the upcoming Wikileaks release of numerous emails stolen from Podesta and the Clinton campaign. The emails were released beginning on October 7, 2016.
  - Mueller's team interviews Gates.
- November 15: Judge Friedrich refuses to dismiss the case against Concord Management and Consulting. She rejects the argument that the case against the company should be dismissed because there is no law prohibiting interfering in U.S. elections. Instead, she writes, the case is about whether the company was "deceptive and intended to frustrate" the lawful functions of U.S. government agencies, and that the government does not have to prove the company new what those specific functions were.
- November 16:
  - An unrelated court filing accidentally reveals that Assange has been charged in federal court by the US government.
  - The Daily Beast reports John P. Hannah has come under Mueller investigation scrutiny.
- November 19:
  - In a letter with this date, a person claiming to be an associate of Papadopoulos sends Schiff's office a letter that states that Papadopoulos told Trump in December 2016 that "Greek Orthodox leaders" were "playing an important role" along with their Russian counterparts in his collaboration with Russia. The letter is taken "very seriously" by federal authorities.
  - The Senate Intelligence Committee interviews Bannon.
- November 20:
  - Senate Minority Leader Schumer sends a letter requesting that the DoJ inspector general investigate communications between acting AG Whitaker and the White House.
  - Trump submits his written answers to some questions posed by the Special Counsel.
  - The Federal Agency of News (FAN) sues Facebook in the U.S. District Court for the Northern District of California for violating its free speech rights by closing its account in April. The FAN is a sister organization to the IRA that operates from the same building in St. Petersburg. The FAN claims in its filing that it has no knowledge of the IRA, even though some current FAN employees were indicted by Mueller for their work with the IRA.
  - Mueller's team interviews Cohen for the sixth time.
- November 21:
  - The Daily Beast reports that the House Intelligence Committee is hiring money laundering and forensic accounting experts for its planned investigations when the Democrats take over in January.
  - Mueller's team interviews FBI chief of staff James Rybicki for the fourth of four times.
- November 24: The Digital, Culture, Media and Sport Committee compels the founder of the American software company Six4Three to hand over a cache of internal Facebook documents the company acquired as part of a lawsuit against Facebook. The documents are related to Facebook's data-sharing practices. The committee previously requested such documents from Facebook as part of its investigation into Cambridge Analytica, but the company refused to cooperate.
- November 25: A federal judge rejects Papadopoulos's motion to postpone his prison sentence pending an appeal in a related case challenging Mueller's authority. On September 7, Papadopoulos was sentenced to 14 days in prison, set to start November 26.
- November 26:
  - Corsi reveals that Mueller's team offered him a plea deal. Corsi says he rejected the deal and would rather go to prison than admit he willfully lied to investigators.
  - Mueller's team alleges Manafort broke his cooperation agreement by repeatedly lying to investigators after the deal was signed. Manafort denies lying intentionally, but both parties agree he should be sentenced immediately.
  - Papadopoulos begins his prison sentence in Wisconsin.
- November 27:
  - The Guardian reports that sources claim Manafort met with Assange in March 2016, when he was a key part of the Trump campaign, in addition to meetings in 2013 and 2015. The meeting allegedly took place at the Ecuadorian embassy in London, months before WikiLeaks released Democratic emails stolen by Russian intelligence officers. Manafort denies the report.
  - Corsi releases a draft plea agreement showing Stone tasked him in the summer of 2016 with finding out what damaging information WikiLeaks had on Clinton.
  - The New York Times reports that Manafort's lawyer repeatedly briefed Trump's lawyers on Manafort's discussions with Mueller's team after he agreed to cooperate.
  - Mueller's team interviews Dmitri Klimentov. He helped his brother Denis attempt to connect Carter Page with the Russian Ministry of Foreign Affairs.
  - Mueller's team interviews Patten.
- November 28:
  - The Daily Beast reports Erickson recently hired a lawyer after scrambling to raise funds for his expected legal costs.
  - Trump gives an interview to the New York Post in which he praises Manafort, Corsi, and Stone for not flipping. He says in response to a question about pardons, "It was never discussed, but I wouldn't take it off the table. Why would I take it off the table?"
- November 29:
  Criminal Information document filed with Michael Cohen's November 29 plea agreement
  - Cohen pleads guilty in SDNY to lying to Congress about a Moscow real estate deal involving Trump. The case was brought by Mueller's investigators directly, unlike the August case in which Cohen pleaded guilty in the same court. In the criminal information document filed with the plea agreement, Trump is identified as "Individual 1", Felix Sater as "Individual 2", and Dmitry Peskov as "Russian Official 1".
  - BuzzFeed News reports that in 2016 the Trump Organization planned to give Putin the $50 million penthouse in the proposed Trump Tower Moscow.
  - Trump admits for the first time that he was pursuing a business deal in Moscow during the presidential campaign. He repeatedly denied any such dealings since announcing his candidacy.
  - The Maryland State Board of Elections releases a report detailing the United States Department of Homeland Security's investigation into the integrity of the state's election systems. The investigation was triggered by the July 13 revelation that ByteGrid, Maryland's election systems supplier, was purchased by a Russian oligarch without the state being informed of the change in ownership. No evidence of malicious activity was found, but the state changed providers anyway as a precautionary measure.
- November 30:
  - The prosecution announces at Manafort's preliminary sentencing hearing in Washington, D.C., that it is considering more charges against Manafort and may retry him on the charges the jury was unable to agree on in his trial.
  - The Central Bank of Russia announces Torshin has retired from his position as Deputy Governor.
  - The Senate Intelligence Committee interviews Boris Epshteyn.
- November 30 – December 3: Nunes and his aides Derek Harvey, Scott Glabe, and George Pappas travel to Europe to investigate the origins of the Mueller investigation. Giuliani associate Lev Parnas assists Harvey with arranging meetings and calls in Europe.

=== December ===
Michael Flynn – sentencing memorandum

Michael Flynn – addendum to sentencing memorandum

- December: Manafort continues interactions with Kilimnik up until this month. Manafort later lied under oath about his interactions.
- December 1: Cohen's lawyers file his sentencing memorandum, in which they ask the court for no prison time because of his cooperation with federal investigators.
- December 3:
  - Trump attacks Cohen on Twitter for asking for no prison time, calling him a liar and accusing him of making a deal to protect his wife and father-in-law from prosecution. In 2019, The Mueller Report refers to these tweets as evidence of witness intimidation.
  - Mueller's team complains to Trump's personal counsel in writing that Trump's responses submitted on November 20 were insufficient, including more than 30 questions answered with "does not 'recall' or 'remember' or have an 'independent recollection'" of the requested information. They again ask for an in-person interview with Trump.
  - The Senate Intelligence Committee interviews Shlomo Weber.
- December 4: In a sentencing memorandum, the Mueller investigation says Michael Flynn "deserves credit for accepting responsibility in a timely fashion and substantially assisting the government" and should receive little or no jail time.

Sentencing memorandum for Michael Cohen filed by federal prosecutors in the Southern District of New York (SDNY).

- December 6: Mother Jones reports that the Trump campaign and the NRA both used National Media Research, Planning and Placement (NMRPP) to buy political ads in 2016, often with the same NMRPP employee buying ads for both Trump and the NRA for the same dates, television stations, and television shows. Former Federal Election Commission chair Ann Ravel tells Mother Jones, "I don’t think I’ve ever seen a situation where illegal coordination seems more obvious. It is so blatant that it doesn’t even seem sloppy. Everyone involved probably just thinks there aren’t going to be any consequences."
- December 7:
  - Mueller files a sentencing memorandum for Manafort in D.C. federal court.
  - Mueller and federal prosecutors from the SDNY file sentencing memoranda for Cohen in Manhattan federal court. The SDNY memorandum effectively accuses Trump of defrauding voters. In the memorandum, Trump is identified as "Individual-1", Karen McDougal as "Woman-1", Stephanie Clifford as "Woman-2", the Trump Organization as "Company", the National Enquirer as "Magazine-1", Pecker as "Chairman-1", and American Media, Inc. as "Corporation-1". In one of the filings, Cohen spoke of a Russian "trusted person" in the Russian Federation who could offer the Trump campaign "political synergy" and "synergy on a government level."
  - Comey testifies for seven hours before the House Judiciary and Oversight and Government Reform committees behind closed doors. He tells the committees that in 2016 the FBI opened investigations into four Americans to determine if they were involved in the Russian election interference. He says some of the four were associated with the Trump campaign, but that Trump himself is not among them. He also testifies that he opened an investigation into leaks related to the Clinton email investigation involving the New York FBI field office, Giuliani, and others, and that the investigation was still underway when he was fired.
  - WikiLeaks, the Trump campaign, Kushner, Papadopoulos, and Stone file motions to dismiss the April 2018 DNC lawsuit against them. WikiLeaks argues the suit should be dismissed because it did not participate in hacking the DNC, and its publication of the DNC's material is protected by the First amendment. The Trump campaign argues the suit should be dismissed because it seeks to "explain away [the DNC] candidate’s defeat in the 2016 presidential election" and fails to show the campaign "aided and abetted Russia." Kushner's filing argues the suit should be dismissed because he had no prior knowledge of the Trump Tower meeting. Papadopoulos and Stone's filings cast their roles as innocuous. None of the filings contest the events the DNC laid out in its suit.
  - The Campaign Legal Center and Giffords Law Center to Prevent Gun Violence file a joint complaint with the Federal Election Commission alleging the NRA and the Trump campaign illegally coordinated ad buys in 2016.
  - Papadopoulos completes his term of imprisonment and is released from prison.

Transcript of Comey testimony before the House Judiciary and Oversight and Government Reform committees

- December 8: The House Judiciary and Oversight and Government Reform committees release the transcript of the prior day's Comey testimony.
- December 9: Corsi files a $350 million lawsuit against Mueller, the Justice Department, the FBI, the CIA, and the NSA for allegedly illegally searching Corsi's phone and text messages without a warrant or probable cause.
- December 11:
  - The sentencing hearing in the Manafort case in D.C. begins, and is then postponed until January.
  - CNN reports that Butina agreed to plead guilty to spying and is now cooperating with the prosecutor.
- December 12:
  - Former Trump attorney Cohen is sentenced to three years in prison.
  - Federal prosecutors from SDNY unseal a non-prosecution agreement entered into on September 20 with American Media, Inc., that gives the company immunity from prosecution in exchange for its help in investigating a payment it made to McDougal at the direction of Trump.
  - New York Attorney General-elect Letitia James tells NBC News that she plans to investigate Trump, his family, and associates. Her investigations will include potentially illegal real estate dealings, the June 9, 2016 Trump Tower meeting, government subsidies received by Trump, potential emoluments clause violations through his businesses, and the Trump Foundation. Her ability to investigate may hinge upon the passage of a bill by the State of New York that would allow her to bring prosecutions under New York law for acts that are pardoned under federal law.
  - Reuters reports that Putin is unclear about why Butina was arrested. He said, "She risks 15 years in jail. For what? I asked all the heads of our intelligence services what is going on. Nobody knows anything about her."
  - Cohen's lawyer Lanny Davis tells Bloomberg that Trump and the White House knew in advance that Cohen was going to lie to Congress and did nothing to dissuade him from doing so.
  - The Kyiv Administrative District Court rules that National Anti-Corruption Bureau director Artem Sytnyk and member of the Ukrainian Parliament Serhiy Leshchenko acted illegally when they revealed that Manafort's name and signature were in Yanukovych's "black ledger". The court rules that their actions "led to interference in the electoral processes of the United States in 2016 and harmed the interests of Ukraine as a state." Leshchenko responds in a Facebook post that the real purpose of the ruling is to help Ukrainian president Petro Poroshenko ingratiate himself with Trump. The ruling was on a lawsuit brought by fellow member of parliament Boryslav Rozenblat of the Poroshenko Bloc party. On July 16, 2019, the decision is overturned by the Sixth Administrative Court of Appeal.
  - Trump declines Mueller's team's in-person interview request made on December 3.

Maria Butina statement of the offense.

- December 13:
  - Butina pleads guilty in a D.C. federal court to trying to infiltrate the U.S. conservative movement as an agent for the Kremlin. She admits to working with Erickson to forge bonds with NRA officials and conservative leaders while under the direction of Torshin. In her plea agreement, prosecutors agreed to drop a charge of failing to register as a foreign agent in exchange for cooperation. In the statement of the offense, Erickson is identified as "U.S. Person 1", Torshin as the "Russian Official", the Republican Party as "Political Party #1", and the NRA as the "Gun Rights Organization".
  - The Wall Street Journal and NBC News report that Trump, Cohen, and Pecker met in August 2015 and agreed that Pecker would seek out and suppress any negative stories about Trump.
  - The Wall Street Journal reports that the Manhattan U.S. attorney's office has started investigating the Trump inaugural committee for misspending money, or, possibly selling access to the incoming Trump administration to get policy concessions or influence Trump administration positions.
  - Trump denies directing Cohen to break the law in a tweet, and tells Fox News the charges against Cohen were cooked up to "embarrass" him.
  - Trump tweets that "[he] never directed Michael Cohen to break the law," that Cohen plead guilty to "embarrass the president" and protect his family from prosecution, and finishes with, "As a lawyer, Michael has great liability to me!" In 2019, The Mueller Report refers to these tweets as evidence of witness intimidation.
- December 14:
  - An entire floor of the federal courthouse in Washington, D.C., is sealed off for a closed-door hearing involving an unidentified foreign government-owned company challenging a subpoena for Mueller's grand jury. In October 2020, CNN reveals that the company is a state-owned Egyptian bank that may have been the source of funds for Trump's $10 million loan to his campaign on October 29, 2016.
  - Cohen tells George Stephanopoulos in an ABC News interview that Trump knew it was wrong to pay McDougal and Clifford.
  - Federal prosecutors file a motion asking a judge for permission to move Butina to and from the Alexandria City Jail for interviews and, potentially, to testify before a grand jury. Intended to be under seal, the motion is briefly posted to the court website before being removed.
- December 16: Trump attacks Cohen on Twitter, calling him a "Rat" for cooperating with the FBI. In 2019, The Mueller Report refers to this tweet as evidence of witness intimidation.

Indictment of Bijan Kian and Kamil Ekim Alptekin unsealed on December 17, 2018.

The IRA, Social Media and Political Polarization in the United States, 2012-2018

The Tactics & Tropes of the Internet Research Agency

- December 17
  - Federal prosecutors unseal an indictment against Bijan Kian and Kamil Ekim Alptekin, charging them both with conspiracy and acting as unregistered agents of a foreign government. Alptekin is also charged with making false statements. Kian is Flynn's business partner in Flynn Intel Group, and Alptekin hired the Group on behalf of the Turkish government to influence opinion in the U.S. and facilitate the extradition of Fethullah Gülen. In the indictment, Flynn is identified as "Person A", Flynn Intel Group as "Company A", Inovo BV as "Company "B", Gülen as "Turkish citizen", President Recep Tayyip Erdoğan as "Senior Turkish Leader #1", Prime Minister Binali Yıldırım as "Senior Turkish Leader #2", and, in no particular order, Energy Minister Berat Albayrak and Foreign Minister Mevlüt Çavuşoğlu as "Turkish Minister #1" and "Turkish Minister #2". Reports indicate there are strong hints Flynn was a contributing cooperator.
  - Mueller's team releases the FBI notes on the interview with Flynn on January 24, 2017.
  - The Senate Intelligence Committee releases two reports it commissioned on the social media activities of the IRA: "The Tactics & Tropes of the Internet Research Agency" and "The IRA, Social Media and Political Polarization in the United States, 2012-2018".

D.C. Circuit Court of Appeals ruling: the Foreign Sovereign Immunities Act does not protect a company owned by a foreign country from a grand jury subpoena.

- December 18:
  - Bijan pleads not guilty in federal court in Alexandria, Virginia. A spokesperson for Alptekin tells the court that he denies any wrongdoing.
  - Michael Flynn's sentencing is delayed for 90 days as Judge Emmet Sullivan accuses Flynn of possible treason and states that he "sold out his country.".
  - The D.C. Circuit Court of Appeals upholds the grand jury subpoena that was argued over in a December 14 closed-door hearing that drew the attention of the press because security cleared the entire floor of the courthouse during the proceedings. The court rules that the Foreign Sovereign Immunities Act does not immunize a corporation owned by a foreign country even if the subpoena violates that country's laws.
  - After acting attorney general Whitaker consults Justice Department ethics officials multiple times, the officials tell a group of Whitaker's advisers that he should recuse himself from the Mueller investigation.
- December 19:
  - In a Moscow news briefing, Russian foreign ministry spokeswoman Maria Zakharova says that Butina was coerced into making a false confession: "Butina confirmed that she had done a deal with U.S. investigators and confessed to being a foreign agent. Having created unbearable conditions for her and threatening her with a long jail sentence, she was literally forced to sign up to absolutely ridiculous charges."
  - US District Judge Ursula Ungaro dismisses Aleksej Gubarev's February 2017 defamation lawsuit against BuzzFeed News. Gubarev claimed Buzzfeed News defamed him by publishing unproven statements about him in the Steele dossier. Ungaro rules that the BuzzFeed News article was "true and fair" because it reproduced the entire dossier without commentary. Gubarev's lawyers announce they plan to appeal the ruling.
  - D.C. Attorney General Karl Racine sues Facebook over its involvement with Cambridge Analytica.
  - The Wall Street Journal reports that sworn depositions by Trump show that he has extensive knowledge of campaign finance laws. The knowledge demonstrated in the depositions contradicts Trump's assertions that any campaign finance violations he may have committed during 2015–16 were due to his own ignorance.
  - The U.S. Treasury Department informs Congress that it is going to remove sanctions from three companies (En+ Group, Rusal, and EuroSibEnergo) controlled by Deripaska in 30 days because he reduced his ownership stake below 50 percent in each. The Treasury also announces new sanctions on 15 Russian intelligence officers for election interference in the U.S. and elsewhere, as well as the nerve agent attack in the U.K.
  - Whitaker's advisers recommend that he not recuse himself from the Mueller investigation, contradicting the advice they received from Justice Department ethics officials the day before.
  - Incoming House Oversight committee chairman Elijah Cummings (D-Md.) issues 51 letters to the heads of various government agencies and White House and Trump Organization officials seeking documents on a series of congressional investigations, with a deadline of January 11.
  - The Senate Intelligence Committee interviews Jill Stein.
- December 20:
  - The House Intelligence Committee votes unanimously to release the official transcript of Stone's testimony before the committee to Mueller's team.
  - Senate Intelligence committee staffer James Wolfe is sentenced to two months in prison for lying to the FBI about leaking classified information on the Russia probe to the press.
- December 21:
  - CNN reports that Trump told Whitaker that prosecutors at SDNY are out of line and asked Whitaker why he isn't doing more to rein them in.
  - LinkedIn general counsel Blake Lawit informs the Senate Intelligence Committee that an internal investigation of IRA activity found 91 accounts and five fake company pages, most of which were established in 2015.
- December 22: The unnamed foreign state owned company involved in the December 18 D.C. Circuit Court of Appeals ruling appeals the ruling to the U.S. Supreme Court.
- December 24: U.S. Supreme Court Chief Justice Roberts temporarily freezes accruing fines against a foreign state owned corporation that was subpoenaed by the Mueller probe. The court ordered Mueller to respond by December 31.
- December 27
  - McClatchy DC reports that Cohen's cellphone communicated with cell towers in the Prague area in late summer 2016, lending credence to allegations in the Steele dossier. They also report that an Eastern European intelligence agency overheard a Russian conversation in late August/early September that included remarks saying Cohen was in Prague. Cohen denies the story, but McClatchy insists the information came from four independent sources. The 2019 Mueller Report states that Cohen never traveled to Prague.
  - Eric Dubelier, a lawyer defending Concord Management and Consulting, who earlier asked the court to lift the prohibition from sharing discovery information with his client in Russia, files a motion to prevent Mueller from providing classified information to the judge that justifies the restriction. Mueller has provided Dubelier with 4 million pages from email and social media accounts belonging to Russian trolls, and asserts that sharing 3.2 million of those pages with Dubelier's clients in Russia would compromise intelligence gathering techniques.
  - Mueller's team asks U.S. District Judge Richard J. Leon to postpone the scheduled January 3, 2019, hearing for the December 10 lawsuit Corsi filed against Mueller, the FBI, and other government agencies because of the government shutdown. Judge Leon refuses.

Letter from the House Judiciary Committee majority to the Senate majority leader, acting attorney general, and the Department of Justice inspector general on the status of their investigation into the FBI's 2016 Russia investigation.

- December 28: GOP-led House Judiciary Committee releases final report on early Russia probe, condemning the FBI for being "unfair" and demanding a second special counsel to investigate the investigators.

== See also ==
- Assessing Russian Activities and Intentions in Recent US Elections
- Business projects of Donald Trump in Russia
- Criminal charges brought in the Mueller special counsel investigation
- Cyberwarfare by Russia
- Efforts to impeach Donald Trump
- Foreign electoral intervention
- List of lawsuits involving Donald Trump
- Propaganda in post-Soviet Russia
- Russian interference in the 2016 Brexit referendum#Timeline
- Russian interference in the 2018 United States elections
- Social media in the United States presidential election, 2016
- Timelines related to Donald Trump and Russian interference in United States elections
- 2017–18 United States political sexual scandals
