= Timeline of investigations into Donald Trump and Russia (January–June 2017) =

This is a timeline of major events in the first half of 2017 related to the investigations into links between associates of Donald Trump and Russian officials that are suspected of being inappropriate, relating to Russian interference in the 2016 United States elections. Following the timeline of Russian interference in the 2016 United States elections before and after July 2016 up until election day November 8 and the post-election transition, this article begins with Donald Trump and Mike Pence being sworn into office on January 20, 2017, and is followed by the second half of 2017. The investigations continued in the first and second halves of 2018, the first and second halves of 2019, 2020, and 2021.

== January–June 2017 – Trump administration ==
=== January ===
- January:
  - For two days in early January 2017, in a gathering George Nader attended and brokered, Joel Zamel and General Ahmed Al-Assiri met with Michael Flynn and other members of the Trump transition team in New York. Steve Bannon was involved as well. In October 2018, the meeting came under the Mueller investigation's scrutiny.
  - White House Counsel Donald McGahn tells Trump he believes that Flynn had misled the FBI and lied to Vice President Pence, and should be fired.
  - McGahn researches the Logan Act and federal laws related to lying to federal investigators. Records turned over to the Mueller investigation show McGahn believes Flynn violated one or more of those laws.

Susan Rice's email to herself on January 20, 2017

- January 20:
  - Trump and Pence take office.
  - While seated at Trump's inauguration speech, Flynn texts Alex Copson, chairman of ACU Strategic Partners, that Russian sanctions blocking a private Russian-backed plan to build nuclear plants in the Middle East will now be "ripped up". An associate of Copson later denies the allegation.
  - Sergei Millian, Source D in the Steele dossier, attends VIP inauguration events. He also arranges to meet with Papadopoulos at the Washington, D.C., restaurant Russia House. Millian brings Moroccan American music producer Aziz Choukri to the meeting. Papadopoulos later claims Choukri accused Millian of working for the FBI, but in a separate interview Choukri denies the accusation occurred.
  - Natalia Veselnitskaya, the Russian lawyer involved in the June 2016 Trump Tower meeting, and Rinat Akhmetshin, another participant in that meeting, attend the Liberty Ball at the Library of Congress hosted by Representative Dana Rohrabacher's campaign committee. Akhmetshin later claims he received tickets from event organizers, but Rohrabacher's office claims the campaign has no record of such an invitation or of ticket purchases by the two. Ukrainian oligarch Serhiy Lyovochkin attends using tickets acquired for him by Sam Patten and Kilimnik. Ukrainian lawmaker Serhiy Kivalov attends the event, but refuses later to tell reporters how he obtained the tickets he displayed on Twitter. Ukrainian lawmaker Borislav Bereza attends using tickets he says he received from someone "connected to Illinois." Ticket sales are counted as donations to Rohrabacher's campaign. In July 2018, Rohrabacher spokesman Kenneth Grubbs tells ABC News, "Apparently, there was some party-crashing going on."
  - Maria Butina attends the inaugural Freedom Ball with Paul Erickson. It is one of the three balls Trump attends.
- January 20–21: Manafort, Kilimnik, and Lyovochkin meet in a Westin Hotel in Alexandria, Virginia, to discuss the proposed Ukraine peace plan.
- January 21:
  - Trump appoints Flynn as National Security Advisor.
  - Bannon phones Page, and they talk about Russia. According to congressional testimony given by Page in November 2017, Bannon referred to the dossier and asked him to cancel a scheduled television appearance.
- January 22: Michael Flynn is sworn in as National Security Advisor.
- January 23
  - Sean Spicer repeats that Flynn did not discuss sanctions with Kislyak in late December. Emails from December show Spicer most likely knew Flynn discussed sanctions with Kislyak on December 29, 2016, and may have known about the purpose of the call in advance.
  - GCHQ director Robert Hannigan suddenly resigns. The Guardian reports that the resignation may have been over concerns about sharing intelligence with the Trump administration.
  - During a committee business meeting, the Senate Intelligence Committee votes unanimously to start a formal inquiry into Russian activities during the 2016 presidential election cycle.

Redacted FBI notes on the Flynn interview conducted on January 24, 2017.

- January 24:
  - The FBI interviews Flynn about his conversations with Kislyak. Flynn denies discussing sanctions with Kislyak, which the FBI knows is false. He conceals the interview, which took place without a lawyer present, from the White House. On December 1, 2017, Flynn will plead guilty to lying during the interview.
  - Comey tells top FBI agents that Trump asked him to stay on as FBI director.
  - The Senate Intelligence Committee begins its inquiry into Russian active measures in the 2016 elections.
- January 24–26: The FBI interviews Igor Danchenko, a primary source for the Steele dossier, for three days about the information he provided to Steele.
- January 25: The House Intelligence Committee announces that it is investigating "any intelligence regarding links between Russia and individuals associated with political campaigns" and other topics.
- January 26:
  - Acting Attorney General Sally Yates warns McGahn and White House Counsel's Office attorney James Burnham that Flynn has not been truthful about his contacts with Russia and may be vulnerable to blackmail by Russian intelligence. Afterwards, McGahn asks John Eisenberg look into the possible legal implications of the Flynn-Kislyak interactions and the FBI interview. Flynn is fired 18 days later, on February 13.
  - Priebus and McGahn personally tell Trump that Flynn is under criminal investigation.
  - Dmitriev tells Gerson that Putin is asking for feedback on the reconciliation document and wants Dmitriev to have key U.S. meetings within the next two weeks. He says Putin will speak to Trump by phone on January 28.
  - Dmitriev tells Nader that Putin emphasized to him that they need to "build this communication channel to avoid bureaucracy."

- January 27:
  - The FBI interviews Papadopoulos at his family's Chicago home about Russian meetings in 2016. After being cautioned about making false statements, Papadopoulos repeatedly lies to the investigators, telling them he only met Mifsud in February 2016 before he joined the Trump campaign and denying he tried to help Russians set up meetings with the campaign. In October 2017 he will plead guilty to making omissions and false statements during the interview. Hours after the interview, he applies for the position of Deputy Assistant Secretary in the Department of Energy.
  - Eisenberg informs McGahn that Flynn may have violated the law, but is unlikely to be prosecuted.
  - McGahn has further discussions with Yates about Flynn.
  - During a private dinner at the White House, Comey gets the impression that Trump wants to "create some sort of patronage relationship." Comey will later testify that Trump requested "loyalty" from him, and that he offered "honesty" instead.
  - Deripaska's longtime American lobbyist Adam Waldman visits Julian Assange.
- January 28: Dmitriev asks Nader whether he can confirm to Putin that Trump may use ideas in his reconciliation document in their phone call later that day. Nader confirms that he and Gerson passed the document on to the Trump team, and that they took it seriously. After the Trump-Putin call, Dmitriev tells Nader "the call went very well" and that Putin wants Dmitriev to continue making public statements on Russian cooperation. Separately, Gerson tells Dmitriev the call went well, and Dmitriev replies that the document "played an important role."
- January 29: Trump's lawyers give Mueller a confidential memo and claim that Trump knew only that Flynn had been interviewed by the FBI, and believed Flynn had been cleared.
- January 31:
  - Trump dismisses Yates for refusing to enforce Executive Order 13769, calling it "betrayal" and "weak".
  - Alexander Torshin, Maria Butina, Paul Erickson, and former Kremlin staffer Andrey Kolyadin dine with Representatives Dana Rohrabacher and Thomas Massie at a private dinner hosted by Rockefeller heir George O’Neill Jr.

=== February ===
- February:
  - According to later reporting by Michael Wolff, former British Prime Minister Tony Blair, during a visit to the White House, warns Kushner that UK intelligence services may have had the Trump campaign under surveillance. Blair denies Wolff's claims.
  - Paul Manafort and Rick Gates falsely assert for a second time in writing to the Justice Department that their work for the Ukrainian government did not require registering as foreign agents in the United States. In September 2018, Manafort pleads guilty to lying to the Justice Department about the extent of his work for the Ukrainian government.
  - The FBI investigation of reported cyber links between the Trump Organization and Alfa-Bank concluded that there were no such links.
- Early February: Cohen delivers a pro-Russian Ukrainian peace plan to Flynn while visiting the White House. The plan was developed by Sater and Andrii Artemenko, a Ukrainian politician who said he was encouraged by "top aides" to Putin. The meeting was arranged by Ukrainian-American Alex Oronov, whose daughter is married to Cohen's brother. Allen Tactical Security Consultants founder Tommy Allen vetted the peace plan at the request of former congressman Curt Weldon, a longtime friend of Artemenko. Artemenko and Weldon secured funding for promoting the plan from Vekselberg's fund at Columbus Nova.
- February 2:
  - Alexander Torshin and Maria Butina attend the National Prayer Breakfast. Torshin is scheduled to meet privately with Trump beforehand, but the meeting is canceled after a national security aide points out that Torshin is under investigation for organized crime and money laundering. A spokesman for Torshin later says Torshin was officially on vacation at the time, adding, "President Trump has never proposed a meeting to Mr. Torshin."
  - Ted Malloch is reportedly Trump's top pick to be the next U.S. Ambassador to the European Union. E.U. officials threaten to reject Malloch's credentials if he becomes the new ambassador. In 2018, Malloch is served a search warrant by the FBI and questioned by Mueller.
  - During a joint press conference with Hungarian Prime Minister Viktor Orban, Putin asserts that Ukrainian oligarchs funded Clinton's 2016 campaign.
  - Senators Lindsey Graham and Sheldon Whitehouse announce an investigation by the Senate Judiciary Subcommittee on Crime and Terrorism into Russian influence in U.S. elections.
  - Eisenberg reviews the underlying information the Justice Department provided on the Flynn-Kislyak phone calls. He discusses it with McGahn, and they decide Flynn is unlikely to be prosecuted, though they do not know what Flynn told the FBI.
- February 3:
  - Russian tech magnate Aleksej Gubarev files a libel suit in London against Christopher Steele and his company, Orbis Business Intelligence. Gubarev claims he was defamed by allegations in the Steele dossier.
  - Aleksej Gubarev files a libel suit against BuzzFeed in the Broward County Circuit Court in Fort Lauderdale, Florida. Gubarev claims he was defamed by BuzzFeed publishing the Steele Dossier.
- February 6: Patten publishes an article, "Ukraine Can Win in the Trump Age", in U.S. News & World Report that he and Lyovochkin co-wrote as part of his unregistered lobbying work.
- February 8:
  - Sessions is confirmed as Attorney General by a vote of 52 to 47; he is sworn in the next day.
  - Comey meets with Priebus at the White House and informs him that Justice Department policy is not to discuss investigations with the White House.
  - Flynn publicly denies that he discussed sanctions with Kislyak in December.
  - According to Trump's lawyers, Flynn tells McGahn, Priebus, and John Eisenberg in a White House discussion that the FBI had met with Flynn to tell him their investigation was over.
  - Vnesheconombank (VEB) head Sergey Gorkov's assistant Ivanchenko texts Kushner's assistant Avi Berkowitz to set up a second meeting between Gorkov and Kushner. In March 2018, Berkowitz tells Mueller's team that he ignored the request because of press coverage of the Russia investigation and did not tell Kushner about it.
- February 9:
  - The Washington Post reports that Flynn privately discussed Russian sanctions with Kislyak before Trump took office, which Flynn had previously denied. Flynn's spokesman now says, "[Flynn] couldn't be certain that the topic never came up." The report leads Pence and White House advisors to read the underlying information from the Justice Department. After speaking to Flynn, Priebus and McGahn conclude that Flynn lied to the FBI and should be terminated.
  - Representative Jerrold Nadler (D-NY) introduces a resolution of inquiry in relation to possible crimes relating to Trump's financial dealings or collusion with Russia.
- February 10
  - Trump tells reporters he did not know about Flynn's December discussions of sanctions with Kislyak.
  - According to Trump's lawyers, Flynn tells McGahn, Priebus, and Pence in a phone call that the FBI had said their investigation was being "closed out."
- February 11:
  - Flynn omits his paid trip to the Russia Today 10th anniversary gala on a financial disclosure form.
  - The FBI interviews Mifsud in the lobby of the Omni Shoreham Hotel in Washington, D.C. Mifsud denies that he had advance knowledge of Russia possessing the DNC's stolen emails.
- February 12: Trump asks Flynn if he lied to Pence about his phone calls with Kislyak. Flynn replies that he doesn't think he did, but he may have forgotten some details about the calls.
- February 13:
  - Flynn is dismissed after less than a month in office.
  - Appearing on Fox News's Your World with Neil Cavuto hours before Flynn leaves, Nunes says he has confidence in Flynn and thinks he shouldn't resign, adding, "He's probably the best intelligence officer of his generation."
- February 14:
  - Trump asks Comey, per Comey's testimony to Congress, to drop any investigation of Flynn. The White House later denies the charge. Trump will fire Comey three months later (May 9).
  - White House Press Secretary Sean Spicer states that Trump asked McGahn to determine whether Flynn had broken the law, and that McGahn told the White House that no law had been broken. He also says no members of the Trump campaign met with Russians during the campaign.
  - The New York Times reports that current and former American officials assert that phone records and intercepts show Trump campaign aides were in repeated contact with senior Russian intelligence officials prior to the election. This is consistent with public statements made by Russian Ministry of Foreign Affairs officials on November 10, 2016.
- February 15:
  - In a morning tweet, Trump calls reports of Russian connections to the campaign "non-sense" and says they are part of a coverup by the Clinton campaign. Later that day, speaking at a joint White House news conference with Israeli Prime Minister Benjamin Netanyahu, Trump describes Flynn as "a wonderful man", adding, "I think it is very, very unfair what has happened to General Flynn." He says the classified documents used against Flynn were "illegally leaked" as part of a "coverup for a terrible loss that the Democrats had under Hillary Clinton."
  - Comey asks Sessions to stop direct communications from Trump and to never leave them alone together.
  - McCabe tells Priebus the February 14 New York Times article on Russian contacts is wrong, but refuses to issue a press release.
  - Judy Woodruff interviews Carter Page on PBS News Hour. In response to a direct question about meetings with Russians, Page denies having any meetings with Russian officials in 2016.
  - Senators Grassley and Feinstein, in their official capacities as the chair and minority chair of the Senate Judiciary Committee, ask the Justice Department and the FBI for a briefing on Flynn and the transcripts of Flynn's phone calls with Kislyak. On May 29, 2020, the DoJ provides the transcripts to Congress.
- February 16:
  - The FBI interviews Papadopoulos a second time. In the following days, he deletes the Facebook account he had had since 2005 (containing correspondence concerning Russia), opens a new Facebook account, and changes his telephone number.
  - During a White House press conference, Trump insists Flynn was fired for lying to Pence. He says he did not tell Flynn to discuss sanctions with Kislyak, but "would have directed him because that's his job." Trump also denies having any connections with Russia.
- February 17
  - Comey meets privately with members of the Senate Intelligence Committee. Later the same day, the Committee votes to issue letters asking the White House and several government agencies to preserve communications related to the Committee's Russia investigation. The Committee also issues a letter to Roger Stone asking him to preserve records.
  - Cambridge Analytica senior executive Brittany Kaiser visits Julian Assange at the Ecuadorian Embassy in London to discuss the U.S. election. The visit is recorded in the embassy's visitor log. In May 2018, Cambridge Analytica CEO Alexander Nix tells the British Digital, Culture, Media and Sport Committee, "We have never spoken to anyone at WikiLeaks."
- February 19
  - Corey Lewandowski says in an interview with White House correspondent Jonathan Karl on ABC's This Week that he does not know of anyone on the campaign having any contacts with any Russians.
  - Andrii Artemenko is expelled from the Radical Party amid calls for him to step down from his seat in the Ukrainian parliament (Verkhovna Rada). The party was outraged by the Ukrainian peace proposal he delivered to Michael Cohen in January.
- February 20:
  - Trump appoints H. R. McMaster to replace Flynn as National Security Adviser.
  - Deputy Press Secretary Sarah Huckabee Sanders states during a White House press briefing that "to the best of our knowledge, no contacts took place" between the Trump team and Russia.
  - Ukrainian prosecutors announce they are investigating Artemenko for treason. They allege he conspired with Russia by promoting a peace plan that would "legitimize" the Russian occupation of Crimea.
- February 23: Trump offers to make McFarland the ambassador to Singapore in exchange for an email stating that he did not instruct Flynn to discuss sanctions with Kislyak. She declines after discussing the offer with Eisenberg.
- February 24:
  - Asked about links between Trump and Russia, Spicer says that "there are no connections to find out about".
  - Nigel Farage tells an audience at CPAC that Trump's election and Brexit launched a "great global revolution."
- February 25: Farage, Trump, his daughter Ivanka, Kushner, and Florida governor Rick Scott dine together at the Trump International Hotel in Washington. Farage is a last-minute addition.
- February 26:
  - Andy Wigmore tells The Guardian that Robert Mercer donated Cambridge Analytica's services to the Leave.EU campaign. The U.K. Electoral Commission says the donation was not declared.
  - Manafort meets with Kilimnik in Madrid. When asked about the meeting by Mueller's team, Manafort initially denies meeting Kilimnik while in Madrid, then acknowledges the meeting after being shown evidence of Kilimnik traveling there from Moscow. He claims Kilimnik updated him on the status of Ukraine's criminal investigation into the "black ledger" payments to Manafort.
- February 28:
  - A resolution of inquiry is defeated in the House Judiciary Committee by an 18–16 party-line vote. The resolution would have required the White House to turn over documents related to Trump's ties to Russia and any conflicts of interest related to his businesses. A Republican member of the committee, Matt Gaetz, calls the motivation for the resolution, which was introduced by Democrat Jerrold Nadler, sour grapes over Clinton losing the election.
  - White House lawyers instruct White House staff to preserve documents related to Russian interference in the election. The instructions are in response to a February 17 letter from the Senate Intelligence Committee asking for the preservations.
  - Aleksej Gubarev files a libel suit against BuzzFeed in the U.S. District Court for the Southern District of Florida for publishing the Steele dossier.

=== March ===
- March
  - Citigroup gives Kushner's company a $325 million loan days after Kushner meets with Citigroup's CEO Michael Corbat. Kushner also borrows $75 million from Apollo Global Management and $10 million from Rockwood Capital. In April 2018, lawyers for Apollo tell The Guardian that the money was used by Kushner to buy out real estate positions owned by Invesco Real Estate. The lawyers insist Kushner and Apollo executive Josh Harris did not discuss Apollo's loan before it was granted.
  - Based upon a complaint by Senators Patrick Leahy and Al Franken, the FBI opens an investigation into whether Sessions perjured himself during testimony before the Senate Judiciary Committee.
- March 1:
  - Sessions comes under scrutiny after reports that he had contact with Russian government officials during the election campaign, even though he denied it during his confirmation hearings. Democratic representatives ask Sessions to resign his post as United States Attorney General.
  - Comey receives an "urgent" call from Trump that Comey views as an attempt to win him over to Trump's side.
  - The DCLeaks website goes offline.

U.S. Attorney General Jeff Sessions recusal statement, March 2, 2017

- March 2:
  - On Trump's instructions, McGahn attempts to persuade Sessions to stop recusing himself from the Russia investigation.
  - Sessions announces that he will recuse himself from any investigations into Russia's interference in the 2016 presidential election.
  - Carter Page and J.D. Gordon admit publicly for the first time that they met with Kislyak during the campaign.
- March 3: In testimony to Congress, Comey says: “It makes me mildly nauseous to think that we might have had some impact on the election.”
- March 4:
  - Corey Lewandowski tells Jeanine Pirro on Fox News that he and Trump never met Carter Page.
  - Trump accuses the Obama Administration of wiretapping his phones. In response, Comey demands that the Justice Department issue a statement correcting the record because the claim is false. No such statement is ever issued. See Trump Tower wiretapping allegations.
  - Trump asks Sessions to reconsider his recusal from any Russia investigations.
- March 5:
  - In a Meet the Press interview, former Director of National Intelligence James Clapper states that, while he was in office, the NSA, FBI, and CIA had found no evidence of collusion between Russia and the Trump campaign. On May 12 he clarifies his statement, saying that he wouldn't have known the contents of an FBI investigation.
  - The White House Counsel's Office is informed that the FBI is asking for Flynn-related records from the transition period, which indicates that Flynn is still under active investigation.
- March 7: Flynn files FARA documents "contain[ing] materially false statements and omissions." On December 1, Flynn acknowledges the nature of the filing in his plea agreement.
- March 9:
  - Nigel Farage visits Julian Assange at the Ecuadorian Embassy in London. Confronted as he leaves, Farage tells BuzzFeed News that "he [can't] remember what he had been doing in the building".
  - According to the Mueller report, Comey briefs the Gang of Eight in Congress on the FBI's Russia investigation.
- March 10:
  - Trump fires 46 U.S. Attorneys, including Preet Bharara, whom Trump had recently told could keep his job. Bharara had been prosecuting a money-laundering case against the Russian company Prevezon. Prevezon's attorney in the case is Natalia Veselnitskaya. The company reaches a financial settlement with the government on May 15, 2017, two days before the trial was scheduled to start.
  - Roger Stone admits to communicating with Guccifer 2.0.
  - Lancaster Online reports that FBI agents had visited the offices of Listrak, the company that housed the Trump server.
  - The FBI interviews Carter Page. He tells them he joined the Trump campaign to help Trump improve relations with Russia.
- March 13: Senate Intelligence Committee Chairman Richard Burr says Roger Stone's communications with Guccifer 2.0 are part of the Committee's ongoing investigation.
- March 15:
  - Roger Stone is in a hit-and-run collision in Pompano Beach, Florida. He is in the front passenger seat when the other car collides with the front passenger door. He claims the collision may have been deliberate because Representative Adam Schiff had recently called for Stone to testify before the House Intelligence Committee.
  - House Intelligence Committee Chairman Devin Nunes says his committee has not found any evidence that Obama had wiretapped Trump Tower, referring to the accusations Trump made via Twitter.
- Late March: Adam Waldman visits Assange twice.
- March 16:
  - The Senate Intelligence Committee leaders issue a joint statement saying they saw "no indications" that Trump Tower had been wiretapped by the U.S. Government.
  - According to the Mueller report, Burr briefs the White House Counsel's Office on the March 9 "Gang of Eight" meeting with Comey. He tells them that the FBI is targeting 4–5 people, including Flynn, Manafort, Page, and a "Greek Guy" (a possible reference to Papadopolous).
  - The FBI interviews Page again.
  - House Oversight Committee ranking member Elijah Cummings sends Secretary of Defense Jim Mattis a letter asking whether Flynn's compensation for his July 2015 speeches at Kaspersky Lab and Volga-Dnepr Airlines violated the Department of Defense's prohibition on retired military personnel receiving payments or gifts from foreign governments.
- March 19: Rohrabacher and Farage go fishing off the coast of Newport, California. Rohrabacher posts a photograph of the two on his Facebook page. In July, he removes the photo from Facebook after a journalist posts it on Twitter.
- March 20:
  - The House Intelligence Committee holds its first public hearing. Comey admits that there is an ongoing FBI investigation into whether there were any links between individuals associated with the Russian government and the Trump campaign and whether they coordinated.
  - Devin Nunes tells David Corn of Mother Jones that he has never heard of Carter Page or Roger Stone. Corn is so surprised by the apparent lie that he immediately tweets about it. In February, the White House asked Nunes to read and debunk a February 14 New York Times article that mentioned Page and Stone being under investigation. On March 3, Nunes discussed the article in an interview with Evan Onstot on Fresno, California, television station KSEE. He said he would not call the people named in the story to appear before his committee.
  - WikiLeaks again denies communicating with Roger Stone.
  - The FBI interviews Peter W. Smith associate Jonathan Safron.
- March 21:
  - Concerned that Trump will fire Comey, officials at the White House Counsel's Office begin drafting a memo examining whether Trump would need to show cause to justify the firing.
  - At Trump's urging, McGahn contacts Boente several times to seek his help in getting Comey or the DOJ to publicly state that Trump is not under investigation. McGahn backs off after Boente convinces him that any intervention could undermine the credibility of investigatory conclusions. Boente tells McGahn that Comey's tenure is not sustainable, which McGahn relays back to Trump.
- March 22:
  - Nunes announces that he discovered the intelligence community "incidentally collected" the communications of some members of Trump's transition team, potentially including the president himself, and claims that the information was "widely disseminated". It is later confirmed that he learned this from Senior Director for National Intelligence Ezra Cohen-Watnick and Assistant White House Counsel Michael Ellis, formerly counsel to Nunes's committee, during his White House visit on the previous day.
  - Trump asks Coats and Pompeo to publicly deny any links between the Trump campaign and Russia. Both refuse, saying the requests are inappropriate. Coats later tells staffers that Trump also asked him to get Comey to back off the FBI investigation of Flynn.
  - The Associated Press reports that Manafort signed a contract with Deripaska to promote Deripaska's interests beginning in 2006. Both Manafort and a spokesperson for Deripaska acknowledge that Manafort worked for Deripaska in the past, but deny many of the allegations in the Associated Press report.
- March 23: Rick Gates, longtime deputy to Manafort and Trump campaign advisor, is forced to leave the pro-Trump nonprofit America First Policies after reports that Manafort sought to further Russian interests.
- March 24: Blogger Mike Krieger posts an article to blog Zero Hedge claiming that CrowdStrike fabricated its report on the DNC hacking because of its supposed ties to Google, Ukraine, and Hillary Clinton. The article forms the basis for the CrowdStrike conspiracy theory Trump invokes in the July 25, 2019, phone call with Ukrainian president Volodymyr Zelenskyy that leads to an impeachment inquiry against Trump.
- March 25: Trump calls Coats and complains that the Russia investigations are hampering his Russia policies. Coats tells Trump that the best thing to do is to let the investigations run their course.
- March 26: Trump calls Rogers and asks him to publicly refute news stories about Trump and Russia. NSA Deputy Director Richard Ledgett, who is on the call, drafts a memo memorializing the request, and both he and Rogers sign it.
- March 27: Schiff and House Minority Leader Nancy Pelosi call for Nunes's recusal from the investigation after details of his White House visit become public.
- March 28:
  - Deripaska runs quarter-page ads in The Wall Street Journal and The Washington Post saying that he is willing to testify before Congress about his relationship with Manafort. In the ads, he denies having signed "a $10 million contract 'to greatly benefit the Putin Government' with Paul Manafort" or similar contracts with anyone else. The ads explicitly deny the contents of the March 22 report by the Associated Press.
  - The FBI interviews former Senate Intelligence Committee staffer Dan Jones.
- March 29: The FBI interviews John Szobocsan, an associate of Peter W. Smith.
- March 30:
  - Flynn tells the FBI and Congress that he would testify in exchange for immunity from prosecution.
  - Former FBI special agent Clint Watts, disinformation expert Thomas Rid, former National Intelligence Officer for Russia and Eurasia Eugene Rumer, and Roy Godson testify as expert witnesses before the Senate Intelligence Committee in the first public hearing in its investigation of Russian influence in U.S. elections. After the hearing, the committee begins pressing social media companies to release more information about Russian activity on their platforms.
  - Trump calls Comey in the morning. According to Comey, Trump asks Comey what he can do to lift the "cloud" impairing the Trump presidency. Trump tells Comey that he didn't do anything wrong and hopes there is a way for Comey to make that information public. After the call, Comey tells Boente about the conversation, asks for guidance, and says he is uncomfortable with direct contact from Trump.
  - The FBI interviews Page a third time.
- March 31:
  - Flynn files an amended financial disclosure form listing his RT speech. The form also lists previously undisclosed speeches made to Kaspersky Government Security Solutions and Volga-Dnepr Airlines.
  - The FBI interviews Page a fourth time.

=== April ===
- April:
  - The FBI obtains a new FISA warrant for Carter Page to replace the expired warrant from January.
  - Waldman visits Assange three times.
- April 3: Eli Lake reports in Bloomberg View that former National Security Advisor Susan Rice had requested to unmask the identities of members of the Trump campaign and presidential transition in surveillance records.
- April 4:
  - BuzzFeed News identifies "Male-1", described in 2015 US government court documents containing evidence of a Russian spy ring attempting to recruit American assets in New York, as Carter Page.
  - Senator Grassley asks the Department of Homeland Security for information on Akhmetshin as a followup to allegations by Bill Browder that he is acting as an unregistered foreign agent and is likely a former Soviet counterintelligence officer.
- April 6: Nunes recuses himself from the House Intelligence Committee investigation. The House Ethics Committee starts an investigation of Nunes's conduct in the month of March.
- April 9: The Internet Research Agency's "United Muslims of America" Facebook group posts a meme complaining about the cost of the April 6 missile strike on Syria by the United States. The strike had been made in retaliation for a chemical weapons attack by the Syrian government. The meme asserts the $93 million cost of the strike "could have founded [sic] Meals on Wheels until 2029."
- April 11:
  - Trump calls Comey and asks him to "get out" that Trump is not personally under investigation. Comey refers Trump to Boente, the Acting Deputy Attorney General. It is the last time they speak.
  - Under direction from Trump, McGahn asks Boente to issue a statement that Trump is not under investigation. Boente declines because of the potential political ramifications, and refuses to order Comey to do it because that could trigger a Special Counsel investigation.
  - Representative Dana Rohrabacher meets with Rinat Akhmetshin at the Westin Grand Hotel in Berlin. They discuss the Prevezon money laundering case in New York, as well as lifting Magnitsky Act sanctions.
  - The FBI learns the existence of Paul Manafort's storage locker from the Associated Press during a meeting about Manafort's business dealings.
  - The Washington Post reveals the existence of the October 2016 FISA warrant for Carter Page.
  - The inspector general of the Defense Intelligence Agency informs House Oversight Committee chair Jason Chaffetz that it is investigating whether Flynn obtained permission to receive foreign government payments.
- April 13:
  - The Senate Intelligence Committee interviews FBI assistant director of the Counterintelligence division Bill Priestap.
  - Trump vents to Rogers in a private conversation that the Russia thing needs to go away and says he did nothing wrong.
- April 19: The White House refuses to fulfill a request from the House Oversight Committee for documents related to Flynn's foreign lobbying.
- April 21:
  - The Ukrainian Prosecutor General's office recommends Andrii Artemenko be stripped of his Ukrainian citizenship because he also holds Canadian citizenship. Ukrainian citizens are not allowed to hold dual citizenship. Artemenko is under investigation for treason.
  - The Senate Intelligence Committee interviews section chief of the FBI Counterintelligence Analysis Section Jonathan Moffa.
- April 23: Trump tells AP White House correspondent Julie Pace in an Oval Office interview that CrowdStrike is a Ukrainian company that the DNC brought in to examine their hacked server after refusing to let the FBI examine it. His claims are from a debunked conspiracy theory that becomes part of a 2019 impeachment inquiry against Trump. This appears to be the first time that the conspiracy theory links CrowdStrike with a wealthy Ukrainian owner and asserts that the DNC server may be in Ukraine.
- April 25:
  - Rosenstein is confirmed by the Senate by a vote of 94–6.
  - Chaffetz tells reporters, "I see no data to support the notion that General Flynn complied with the law" regarding the payments he received from the Turkish and Russian governments. Flynn's lawyer claims that Flynn briefed the Defense Intelligence Agency about his trip to speak at the December 10, 2015 Russia Today gala dinner.
- April 27:
  - Facebook releases a whitepaper, "Information Operations and Facebook", that describes malicious information operations and actors on the platform.
  - The Department of Defense Inspector General opens an investigation into whether the payments Flynn received from Russia Today and the government of Turkey violated the emoluments clause of the U.S. constitution, which retired military officers are bound by because they can be recalled to active duty at any time.
- April 29: Trump is interviewed by John Dickerson on Face The Nation. He says, "The concept of Russia with respect to [the Trump campaign] is a total phony story."

=== May ===
- Concerns about a possible counterintelligence threat posed by Trump's personal and financial dealings with Russia increased after his May 9 dismissal of James Comey, prompting the FBI to open an inquiry separate from the Crossfire Hurricane and Mueller investigations. Within days, deputy attorney general Rod Rosenstein curtailed that inquiry, giving the bureau the impression that Mueller would pursue it, though Rosenstein instructed Mueller not to, effectively ending the inquiry.
- May 2:
  - Trump and Putin plan Russian Foreign Minister Sergey Lavrov's May 10 White House visit.
- May 3:
  - Senator Dianne Feinstein says there is "not yet" any evidence of collusion between Russia and the Trump campaign.
  - FBI Director James Comey testifies before the Senate Judiciary Committee.
- May 4:
  - Rice refuses to testify to Congress.
  - In a Wall Street Journal interview, Peter Smith, a GOP operative and independent opposition researcher, says he tried to acquire the 33,000 deleted Clinton emails. Smith contacted several hackers who claimed to have data, including some potential Russian operatives. Flynn's son Michael G. Flynn was reportedly involved in the effort. Smith kills himself ten days after the interview.
- May 5
  - An aide to Sessions asks a member of Congressional staff if they know of any damaging information about Comey, according to January 2018 reporting by The New York Times.
  - Andrii Artemenko is stripped of his Ukrainian citizenship by order of Ukrainian President Petro Poroshenko.
  - The FBI interviews Stephen Miller.
  - The Washington Post reports that members of the Trump transition team told Flynn in November 2015 that his phone conversations with Kislyak were likely monitored by U.S. intelligence agencies.
  - The White House confirms Lavrov's May 10 White House visit.
- May 5–7: At Trump's direction, White House Senior Advisor for policy Stephen Miller drafts a letter of dismissal of Comey.
- May 7: The Senate Intelligence Committee sends the Trump campaign a letter requesting a "list and description of all meetings" between any individuals affiliated with the Trump campaign and individuals affiliated with the Russian government or Russian business interests between June 16, 2015, and January 20, 2017.
- May 8: In an Oval Office meeting, Trump informs Priebus, Kushner, Pence and McGahn of his intent to remove Comey, and gives them copies of the Miller draft. McGahn objects to the letter's angry tone and convenes a separate meeting later that day with Sessions, his chief of staff Jody Hunt, White House Counsel's Office attorney Uttam Dhillon, and Rosenstein, who had previously considered removing Comey from office. Rosenstein is given a copy of Miller's draft and agrees to write a new memo that would support the dismissal, using Comey's handling of the Hillary Clinton email investigation as the main rationale.
- May 9:
  - Rosenstein gives Sessions the memo to provide the basis for a recommendation that Comey be dismissed. Rosenstein later says Trump ordered him to write the memo.
  - Trump dismisses Comey from his position as FBI Director.
  - Spicer tells the press that Trump "has no business in Russia; he has no connections to Russia."
  - Upset over the negative press coverage about Comey's firing, Trump calls Rosenstein and asks him to tell the press that Comey's firing was his idea. Rosenstein declines, saying it was a bad idea to talk to the press because he would have to tell the truth that it was Trump's idea. Spicer holds an unplanned press conference that evening and tells reporters, "It was all [Rosenstein]. No one from the White House. It was a DOJ decision."
  - The House Intelligence Committee asks Cohen to provide documents and testimony.
  - The Senate Intelligence Committee interviews National Intelligence Officer (NIO) for Russia and Eurasia Julia Gurganus and NIO for Cyber Issues Vinh Nguyen.
- May 10:
  - Trump holds a meeting in the White House with Russian Foreign Minister Sergey Lavrov and Kislyak. U.S. reporters are excluded. He tells them he is unconcerned about Russian interference in the 2016 election because the U.S. has interfered in other countries' elections in the past. Trump reportedly tells Lavrov and Kislyak he fired Comey to relieve pressure caused by the investigation. Trump shares classified intelligence about ISIS with Lavrov and Kislyak without first seeking permission from the allied sources who collected the information. It is later confirmed that the intelligence came to Trump from Israel via Mike Pompeo.
  - Pence characterizes the dismissal of Comey as a reactive decision Trump made in response to a recommendation by Sessions and Rosenstein.
  - The Senate Intelligence Committee interviews White House Senior Director for Global Economics and Finance Christina Segal-Knowles.
- May 10–16:
  - Acting FBI director Andrew McCabe meets with Rosenstein to discuss Comey's firing. Rosenstein tells McCabe that Trump wanted him to reference Russia in the Comey memo. Rosenstein says he deliberately omitted Russia in the version he gave Sessions on May 9. He gives McCabe a copy of the original draft dismissal letter Stephen Miller wrote for Trump. McCabe documents his conversation with Rosenstein in a memo and later gives Mueller the memo and the draft letter.
  - McCabe opens an obstruction of justice investigation.
  - Rosenstein raises the idea of wearing a wire while speaking with Trump, and exploring whether Cabinet members would invoke the 25th Amendment to remove Trump from office.
- May 11:
  - In an interview with NBC News's Lester Holt, Trump says the Russia investigation was a consideration for him in deciding to dismiss Comey.
  - Rosenstein briefs Chairman Burr and the panel's top Democrat, Warner, who were running their own Russia investigation. According to contemporaneous text messages between FBI officials, "Warner conveyed that he wanted (a) special counsel" and Rosenstein "said he took that under advisement."
  - The New York Times reports that Trump asked Comey for his loyalty at a private dinner in January.
- May 12:
  Congressman Al Green's Floor Speech on the Impeachment of President Trump
  - Trump threatens Comey with alleged secret recordings of their conversations.
  - Two of Trump's lawyers, Sheri A. Dillon and William F. Nelson, say in a letter that the only income Trump has had from Russia are the 2008 sale of Maison de L’Amitie for $95 million to Dmitry Rybolovlev and $12.2 million in payments connected to the Miss Universe 2013 pageant in Moscow. The letter is criticized for covering only a short time period.
  - The Senate Intelligence Committee asks Cohen to provide documents and testimony.
  - Flynn declines an interview request from the Senate Intelligence Committee, invoking his Fifth Amendment protection against self-incrimination.
- May 15: Deripaska sues the Associated Press (AP) for libel. He claims he was defamed by an AP story about his business dealings with Manafort.
- May 16:
  - A key Comey memo about his interactions with Trump is leaked to The New York Times, which publishes an article saying that Trump had asked Comey to go easy on Flynn.
  - Fox News reports that DNC staffer Seth Rich provided DNC emails to WikiLeaks before he died in July 2016. A week later, Fox News retracts the story, and, in 2020, settles a defamation lawsuit brought by Rich's parents.
- May 17:
  - Rosenstein appoints former FBI Director Robert Mueller as special counsel to oversee the investigation into Russian election interference and related matters.
  - Trump tells Sessions to submit his resignation for not preventing the special counsel appointment.
  - Rep. Al Green (D-TX) calls for Trump's impeachment from the House floor.
  - Putin offers to provide a record of the May 10 Oval Office meeting with Russians to the U.S. Congress.
- Late May: Mueller's team interviews Comey.
- May 18:
  - The Russian State Duma approves the nomination of former Deputy Defense Minister Anatoly Antonov to replace Kislyak as U.S. ambassador.
  - Sessions gives Trump his resignation letter. Trump asks Sessions if he wants to stay, and he says yes. Trump ends the meeting but keeps the letter. After the meeting, Bannon and Priebus tell Sessions he should get the letter back because they are concerned Trump could use it as leverage over the DoJ.
  - The Senate Intelligence Committee interviews a panel from the NSA.
- May 19: Feinstein repeats her statement of May 3 that no evidence of collusion was found, and adds that "there are rumors".
- May 22: Flynn refuses to hand over subpoenaed documents to the Senate Intelligence Committee, again citing the Fifth Amendment protection against self-incrimination.
  'Russia, Trump Team in Contact, Former CIA Director Tells Congress' video from Voice of America
- May 23:
  - Experts from the U.S. Department of Justice (DoJ) declare Mueller ethically able to function as special counsel.
  - Trump asks McGahn to call Rosenstein and discuss Mueller's alleged conflicts of interest involving his law firm and his 2011 membership resignation from the Trump National Golf Club. McGahn refuses to make the call, telling Trump that it would look like meddling in the investigation.
  - The House Intelligence Committee hears testimony from former CIA Director Brennan, who states that Russia "brazenly interfered in the 2016 election process" despite U.S. efforts to ward it off.
  - Maxine Waters, ranking member of the House Committee on Financial Services, requests Treasury Secretary Steven Mnuchin to release to the House Financial Services Committee any Financial Crimes Enforcement Network (FinCEN) records involving Deutsche Bank, Russia and Donald Trump.
  - Mueller's team interviews Rosenstein.
  - Fox News retracts its May 16 story claiming Seth Rich provided DNC emails to WikiLeaks.
- May 24:
  - U.S. media reports that Trump has hired lawyer Marc Kasowitz, his longtime legal counsel, to represent him in any inquiry.
  - Sessions claims the reason he didn't disclose meetings with Russian officials on his security forms is that the FBI told him not to list foreign officials he met with in connection with "his Senate activities."
  - The Washington Post reports that Comey's October 2016 decision to reopen the Clinton email investigation was largely based on a probably fake Russian intelligence document. The document discussed a purported email from Attorney General Loretta E. Lynch to Clinton campaign staffer Amanda Renteria in which she promised to go easy on Clinton. Rentaria says she knows a Loretta Lynch who worked for the Clinton campaign during the Whitewater investigation and whom bloggers commonly confuse with the Attorney General.
- May 25: The Senate Intelligence Committee unanimously votes to give its Republican chairman Richard Burr, and Democratic vice chairman Mark R. Warner, "blanket authority" to issue subpoenas during their investigation.
- May 26:
  - The Washington Post reports that Kislyak told Moscow that Kushner wanted a secret communications channel with the Kremlin under Russian supervision.
  - The Senate Intelligence Committee requests that the Trump campaign turn over "all of its emails, documents and phone records" related to Russia. Several months earlier, the committee had asked the campaign committee to preserve records.
  - Mikhail Fridman, Petr Aven, and German Khan file a libel suit against BuzzFeed in New York state court for publishing the Steele dossier. They allege that allegations in the dossier damaged their reputations. All three are owners of Alfa-Bank.
  - The New York Times reports that Deripaska offered to give testimony to congressional intelligence committees in exchange for a grant of full immunity. The committees declined the offer because of concerns that the deal would hamper ongoing criminal investigations.
  - Mueller's team interviews 2016 Republican National Convention delegate Rachel Hoff.
- May 27: The FBI searches Manafort's storage locker for evidence related to the June 2016 Trump Tower meeting. Alexander Trusko, an associate of Manafort with a key to the locker, opens it for the FBI without being shown a search warrant. Trusko signs a consent-to-search form. Upon seeing the locker's contents, the FBI leaves and returns with a warrant. In June 2018, Judge Jackson rejects a motion to suppress evidence found in the locker because Trusko's name is on the lease and he opened the locker voluntarily.
- May 30:
  - Cohen is formally urged to preserve records by the special counsel and the congressional committees. Flynn partially agrees to turn over documents in the investigation.
  - CNN reports on leaked intercepts of conversations between Kremlin officials discussing their potential influence on some Trump campaign members, including financial matters.
  - Trump returns Sessions's May 18 resignation letter with the notation "Not accepted."
- May 31:
  - The House Intelligence Committee serves seven subpoenas – including those on Cohen and Flynn – for testimony, personal documents and business records.
  - The FBI and Congressional committees inquire about a possible third encounter between Sessions and Kislyak on April 27, 2016.
  - The Trump administration offers to reopen the two Russian diplomatic compounds, in New York and Maryland, that the Obama administration locked down on December 29, 2016.
  - The White House announces that it will no longer take questions relating to Russia-Trump allegations, referring such questions to Trump's lawyers.
  - The Senate Intelligence Committee interviews Tom Barrack.

=== June ===
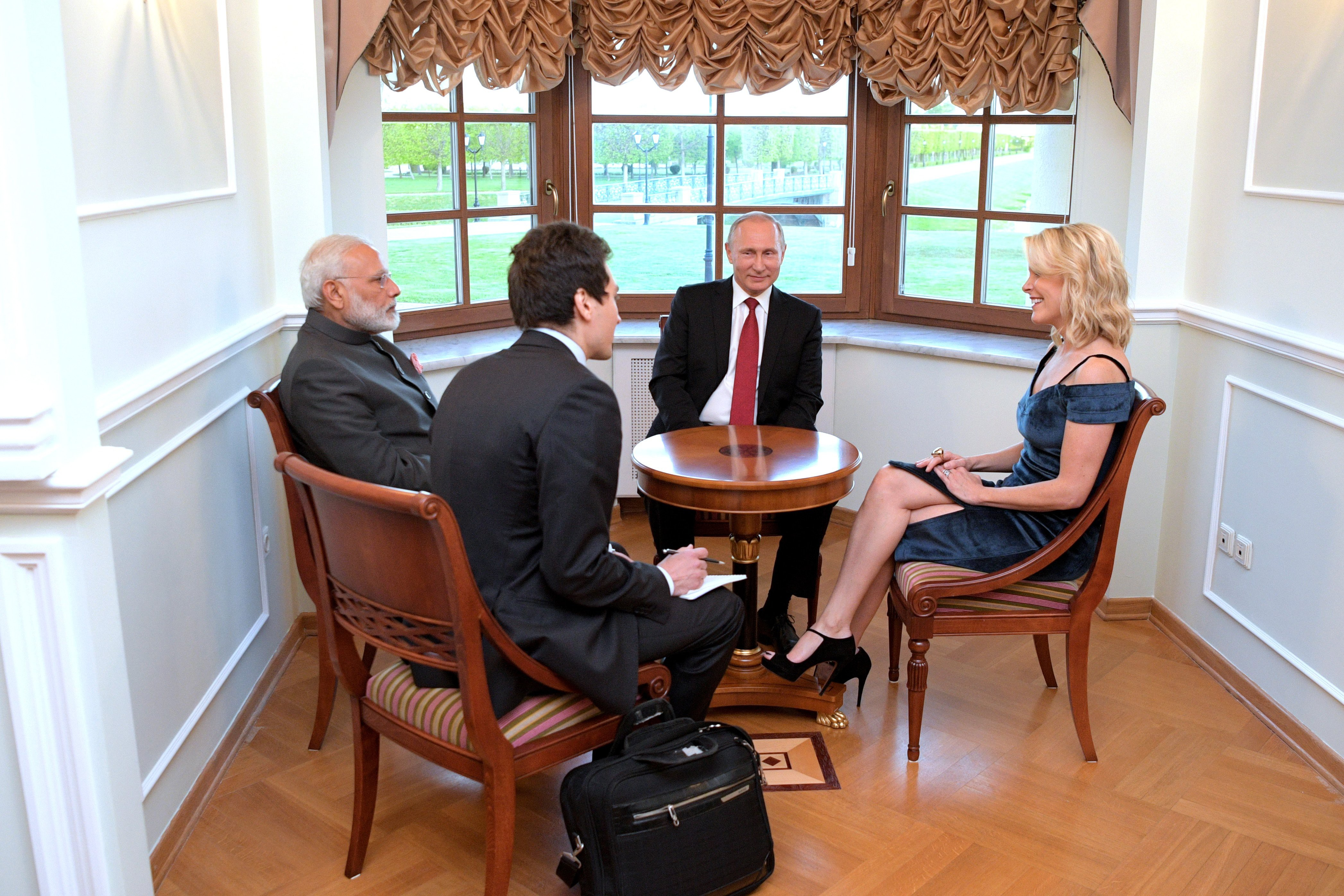
At a conference in St. Petersburg, NBC's Megyn Kelly repeatedly questioned Putin about Russian interference in the 2016 US elections.

- Summer
  - Mueller's team interviews Rosenstein.
  - According to statements made by Ty Cobb in June 2018, McGahn recuses himself and his entire White House staff from the Russia investigation because of their involvement in Flynn's firing.
- June:
  - Trump orders White House Counsel Donald F. McGahn II to fire Mueller. McGahn refuses to relay the order to the Justice Department, saying he would quit. Trump backs down.
  - The FBI obtains a new FISA warrant for Carter Page to replace the expired warrant from April.
  - Trump inauguration committee chair Barrack tells the AP that "a full and clean external audit has been conducted and completed" of the committee's finances, but refuses to furnish a copy. The committee's finances come under criminal investigation in December 2018.
- June 1:
  - Mueller's team interviews Yuval Weber, the son of New Economic School rector Shlomo Weber.
  - Putin denies Russian government interference in the U.S. 2016 elections, and suggests the observed meddling may have been "patriotically minded" Russian hackers.
- June 2:
  - The Guardian reports that Nigel Farage is a person of interest in the FBI investigation of the Trump campaign.
  - Goldstone discusses his participation in the June 9, 2016, Trump Tower meeting with Alan Garten, the general counsel to the Trump Organization. He then emails Veselnitskaya's name to Garten.
- June 3:
  - Mueller takes over an earlier probe into Manafort's activities in Ukraine.
  - The Internet Research Agency's "United Muslims of America" Facebook group organizes the "Make peace, not war!" protest outside Trump Tower in New York City. It is unclear whether anyone attends this protest or instead attends the "March for Truth" affiliated protest held on the same day.
- June 5: The Intercept publishes a top secret NSA document that discusses the targeting by GRU of computer systems maintaining voter rolls in several states. Reality Winner, an NSA contractor, is arrested for leaking the document.
- June 7:
  - Coats and Rogers testify to the Senate Intelligence Committee that they never felt pressured by Trump to do anything inappropriate, but decline to answer questions on private conversations with him.
  - In a prepared written testimony to the Senate Intelligence Committee, Comey confirms telling Trump that he was not personally under investigation, and refusing to say this publicly without prior approval from the Attorney General's office. He also states that Trump felt the Russia story was a "cloud" that prevented him from performing his job as president.
  - The Daily Beast reports that Flynn, while national security advisor, pushed the Pentagon to cooperate with the Russian military in Syria. Such cooperation was banned by Congress in 2015.
  - Mueller's team interviews 2016 Republican National Convention delegate Diana Denman for the first time.
- June 8: Comey testifies before the Senate Intelligence committee in both open and closed hearings.
- June 9:
  - Mueller's team interviews Denis Klimentov, an employee at the New Economic School who attempted to connect Page with the Russian Ministry of Foreign Affairs.
  - Mueller's team interviews FBI chief of staff James Rybicki for the first of four times.
  - Mueller's team informs the White House Counsel's Office that they intend to interview the intelligence community officials Trump asked to push back on the Russia investigation. The notice is given as a courtesy in case the White House wants to invoke executive privilege before the interviews.
- June 12:
  - The Senate Intelligence Committee conducts closed meetings with Rogers and former DHS Secretary Jeh Johnson in the Senate's SCIF.
  - Bannon and Priebus tell Trump's friend Newsmax Media CEO Christopher Ruddy during his visit to the White House that Trump is strongly considering firing Mueller. Priebus authorizes Ruddy to go public with the story. Later in the day, Ruddy tells Judy Woodruff on PBS Newshour that Trump is considering firing Mueller for purported conflicts of interest. This leads to extensive media reports that Trump is considering dismissing Mueller.
  - Representative Brad Sherman (D-CA) begins circulating articles of impeachment to other members of Congress.
  - Mueller's team interviews Rogers.
- June 13:
  - The U.S. Senate agrees on a new package of sanctions on Russia in retaliation to the election interference. The bill is drafted to prevent Trump from lifting sanctions unilaterally.
  - Sessions testifies before the Senate Intelligence Committee.
  - Rosenstein testifies to the Senate that he is the only person empowered to dismiss Mueller, and that he sees no reason to do so.
  - Mueller's team interviews former NSA deputy director Richard Ledgett.
  - Mueller's team interviews Rybicki for the second of four times.
  - Aboard Air Force One, Sanders tells the press, "While the president has every right to [fire Mueller], he has no intention to do so." In July 2018, Sanders tells Mueller's team that her statement was dictated by Trump.
  - Trump's personal attorney contacts Mueller's office about Mueller's possible conflicts of interest, including an asserted personal relationship with Comey.
- June 14:
  - The Washington Post confirms that Mueller is investigating Trump for obstruction of justice, in relation to his dismissal of Comey. This is the first public report that Trump himself is being investigated.
  - Mueller's team interviews Coats.
  - Mueller's team interviews Culver. Culver is a member of Coats's staff.
  - Mueller's team interviews Mike Dempsey.
  - Mueller's team interviews Deputy Director of National Intelligence for Intelligence Integration Edward Gistaro.
- June 15:
  - Mueller's office informs Rosenstein of Mueller's alleged conflicts of interest raised by Trump's attorney on June 13, and then tells Trump's attorney that the concerns have been forwarded to Rosenstein for the DoJ to take appropriate action.
  - The Senate Intelligence Committee interviews Rick Ledgett.
- June 16: Trump tweets: "I am being investigated for firing the FBI Director by the man who told me to fire the FBI Director! Witch Hunt."
- June 17: Trump orders McGahn to call Rosenstein and urge him to fire Mueller for alleged conflicts of interest. McGahn ignores the order because he considers the allegations to be "silly" and "not real". After a followup call from Trump, McGahn packs his things and prepares to resign for refusing to carry out Trump's orders.
- June 18: Trump's lawyer Jay Sekulow states that he has not been notified of any investigation into Trump himself.
- June 19:
  - ABC News contradicts the Post's report of June 14, saying no decision has yet been made on whether to investigate Trump for potential obstruction of justice.
  - McGahn returns to the White House expecting to be asked to resign for not following Trump's orders over the weekend. He decides to stay after Trump fails to mention the topic.
  - Papadopoulos provides a tranche of documents to the Senate Intelligence Committee. The tranche includes a written statement containing many false statements similar to his statements to the FBI on January 27.
- June 19–20 Trump instructs Lewandowski to tell Sessions to make a public statement saying that he will restrict Mueller's investigation to foreign interference in future elections. Trump dictates the proposed statement to Lewandowski. Lewandowski calls Sessions and schedules a meeting at Lewandowski's office the following evening so that he can deliver the message in person. Sessions cancels the meeting at the last moment due to a scheduling conflict, so Lewandowski locks the dictated statement in his safe.
- June 20
  - Speaking about her campaign and party in a Politico interview, Jill Stein says, "I am certainly not aware of any ties whatsoever, financial or otherwise, to the Russian government."
  - Ukrainian President Petro Poroshenko meets with Trump at the White House. The Ukrainian Government paid Michael Cohen between $400,000 and $600,000 to arrange the meeting. A week after Poroshenko returns to Kyiv, the National Anti-Corruption Bureau of Ukraine stops investigating Manafort.
- June 21:
  - Kushner's lawyers provide an amended SF-86 to the FBI, their third such change, to list the meeting with the Russian lawyer.
  - Kushner meets with Hicks, Trump, and Ivanka Trump to discuss documents related to the Trump Tower meeting that he gathered to produce for congressional committees. Trump shuts down the conversation saying he doesn't want to know about it.
  - The House and Senate Intelligence Committees hold hearings on Russian interference in the 2016 elections.
- June 22: Mueller's team interviews Rybicki for the third of four times.
- June 23:
  - The FBI interviews Kushner about his security clearance.
  - Trump's personal counsel submits legal arguments to Mueller's team asserting that "the President's exercise of his constitutional authority here to terminate an FBI Director and to close investigations cannot constitutionally constitute obstruction of justice." In 2019, analysis in the Mueller Report rejects the asserted legal basis for the argument.
  - The Senate Intelligence Committee interviews Brennan.
- June 27:
  - Manafort registers retroactively as a foreign agent with the DoJ, showing that his firm received $17.1 million over two years from Yanukovych's Party of Regions.
  - Goldstone emails Emin Agalarov stating that he was "interviewed by attorneys" about the Trump Tower meeting who were "concerned because it links Don Jr. to officials from Russia—which he has always denied meeting." He reminds Agalarov that he said at the time it was "an awful idea and a terrible meeting." Goldstone sends Kaveladze a screenshot of the email.
- June 28:
  - Mueller's team interviews Pompeo.
  - Hicks reviews the emails Kushner tried to show Trump on June 21 and is shocked by how bad they look.
- June 29: Hicks tells Trump her concerns about the Trump Tower emails. Later in the day, they discuss the Trump Tower meeting with Kushner and Ivanka Trump. Trump said he did not want to know details and tells them not to discuss the emails until after they are given to Congress in a few weeks.
- June 30: On Lawfare, British security consultant Matt Tait claims that he had a series of conversations with Peter Smith in 2016, concerning Hillary Clinton's emails, an unnamed dark web contact, and a new Delaware company called KLS Research. Tait is interviewed by Mueller shortly thereafter.

== See also ==
- Assessing Russian Activities and Intentions in Recent US Elections
- Business projects of Donald Trump in Russia
- Criminal charges brought in the Mueller special counsel investigation
- Cyberwarfare by Russia
- Donald Trump's disclosures of classified information
- Efforts to impeach Donald Trump
- Foreign electoral intervention
- Propaganda in post-Soviet Russia
- Russian interference in the 2016 Brexit referendum#Timeline
- Social media in the United States presidential election, 2016
- Timelines related to Donald Trump and Russian interference in United States elections
