= Victor Ginsburgh =

Belgian economist (1939–2025)

Victor Alexandre Ginsburgh (25 March 1939 – 6 October 2025) was a Belgian economist.

== Life and career ==
Ginsburgh was born in Rwanda-Urundi on 25 March 1939, into an expatriate family: "My father was only a white Russian, and my mother an Austrian Jew".

He studied at the Free University of Brussels (now split into the Université libre de Bruxelles and the Vrije Universiteit Brussel) and mastered in econometrics. Ginsburgh earned an economics PhD in 1972. He was an economics professor at Université libre de Bruxelles from 1975.

Ginsburgh was later an honorary professor. He was co-director of the European Center for Advanced Research in Economics and Statistics (ECARES). Ginsburgh was also a visiting professor in several U.S. universities (Yale, University of Virginia, Chicago University), as well as in France (Paris and Marseille), and Belgium (Louvain and Liège). He was also member of the Center for Operations Research and Econometrics (CORE), Université catholique de Louvain.

He wrote and edited a dozen books, including The Structure of Applied General Equilibrium, Cambridge, MA., MIT Press, 1997, with M. Keyzer, and How Many Languages Do We Need, Princeton University Press, 2011 with Shlomo Weber, and was the author or coauthor of over 180 papers on topics in applied and theoretical economics, including industrial organisation and general equilibrium analysis. His later interests went to the economics of languages, as well as to art history and art philosophy, two fields in which he tried to put to use his (self-taught) knowledge of economics. He published over 50 papers on these topics, some of which appeared in the American Economic Review, the Journal of Political Economy, Games and Economic Behavior, the Journal of Economic Perspectives and the European Economic Review.

Ginsburgh was the author or coauthor of papers on topics in applied and theoretical economics, including industrial organisation and general equilibrium analysis.

Ginsburgh died on 6 October 2025, at the age of 86.

== Political views ==
Ginsburgh was known in Belgium for his criticism of Israel politics which he has expressed in numerous articles.

== Selected bibliography ==
=== Books ===
- How Many Languages Do We Need? The Economics of Linguistic Diversity, Princeton, NJ: Princeton University Press, 2011, viii + 232p. (with S. Weber).
- The Structure of Applied General Equilibrium Models, Cambridge, Mass.: MIT Press, 1997 and 2002 for the paperback edition (with M. Keyzer).
- Activity Analysis and General Equilibrium Modelling, Amsterdam: North- Holland, 1981, 370p. (with J. Waelbroeck).
- La République Populaire de Chine. Cadres Institutionnels et Réalisations: La Planification et la Croissance Economique 1949-1959, Bruxelles: Editions de l'Institut de Sociologie, 1963, 188p.

=== Edited books ===
- The Handbook of the Economics of Art and Culture, vol. 2, Amsterdam: Elsevier, in preparation (with David Throsby).
- The Handbook of the Economics of Art and Culture, vol. 1, Amsterdam: Elsevier, 2006, xxxv + 1321 p. (with David Throsby).

=== Selected papers ===
- Rock and Roll Bands, (In)complete Contracts and Creativity, American Economic Review, Papers and Proceedings 101 (2011), 217-221 (with C. Ceulemans and P. Legros).
- Endowments, production technologies and the quality of wines in Bordeaux. Does terroir matter?, The Economic Journal 118 (2008), F142-F157 (with O. Gergaud).
- Disenfranchisement in linguistically diverse societies. The case of the European Union, Journal of the European Economic Association 3 (2005), 946-964 (with I. Ortuno-Ortin and S. Weber).
- Awards, success and aesthetic quality in the arts, Journal of Economic Perspectives 17 (2003), 99-111.
- The museum pass game and its value, Games and Economic Behavior 43 (2003), 322-325 (with I. Zang).
- Expert opinion and compensation: evidence from a musical competition, American Economic Review 93 (2003), 289-298 (with J. van Ours).
- On invisible trade relations between Mesopotamian cities during the third millennium B.C., The Professional Geographer 53 (2001), 374-383 (with A. Bossuyt and L. Broze).
- Absentee bidders and the declining price anomaly in wine auctions, Journal of Political Economy 106 (1998), 1302–1322.
