= Six4Three =

Tech company

Six4Three is a tech company which produced a way to search for bikini pictures from your contacts on Facebook. After Facebook closed off access to data in 2014, the company sued Facebook for destroying that line of business, hoping to recover the money invested in the app. During discovery Six4Three obtained email and/or internal documents allegedly showing how much Facebook-founder Mark Zuckerberg knew about the privacy gaps in the Facebook partner API. This same API was abused by Cambridge Analytica to data mine information on tens of millions of US voters from a few hundred thousand users. Damian Collins, a UK MP investigating Cambridge Analytica, took interest in the documents and compelled their release in November 2018 by threatening the founder of Six4Three with imprisonment while he was in the UK on other business.
