= Ted Malloch =

American author (born 1952)

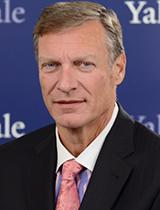
- Malloch at Yale University in 2013
- Born: Theodore Roosevelt Malloch; September 22, 1952 (age 74); Philadelphia, Pennsylvania, U.S.
- Education: Gordon College, Massachusetts (BA); University of Aberdeen (MLitt); University of Toronto (PhD)
- Spouse: Beth Ellen
- Website: www.tedmalloch.me

Theodore Roosevelt Malloch (born September 22, 1952) is an American author, consultant, and television producer. He was a professor at the Henley Business School of the University of Reading, England. He is chairman and chief executive officer of the family firm Global Fiduciary Governance and was chairman and CEO of The Roosevelt Group. He is the author of several books, including Doing Virtuous Business.

In February 2017 Malloch was reported to be a candidate for ambassadorship to the EU. This prompted unusually strong disapproval from EU politicians. That same month, the Financial Times reported that he had made a number of false statements in his autobiography.

== Early life and education ==
Malloch was born at Temple University Hospital in Philadelphia, Pennsylvania, on September 22, 1952, and grew up in Rittenhouse Square, Olney and Main Line.

Malloch earned an M.Litt. degree from the University of Aberdeen and a BA from Gordon College. He earned his Ph.D. in International Political Economy from the University of Toronto in 1980.

== Career ==
Malloch was an Assistant Professor of Political Science at Gordon College in Wenham, Massachusetts.

He was a Professor of Strategic Leadership and Governance at Henley Business School, University of Reading.

He was a Senior Fellow of the Aspen Institute and President of the CNN World Economic Development Congress.

He worked in the United Nations at the UNECE in Geneva, Switzerland, from 1988 to 1992.

Malloch was on the executive board of the World Economic Forum and consulted at Wharton-Chase Econometrics. He worked at Salomon Brothers bank and in senior policy positions at the United States Senate Committee on Foreign Relations and in the U.S. State Department.

He was co-director of the Academy of Business in Society Practical Wisdom program, on spiritual traditions and management.

He was a research scholar for the Spiritual Capital Initiative at Yale University and also worked in management practice at Saïd Business School, University of Oxford.

He has been on a Pew Charitable Trust board, and the Templeton Foundation. He has also been an adviser to The Hudson Institute, American Foreign Policy Council, Institute of Economic Analysis, and the Social Affairs Unit and the Institute of Economic Affairs.

On 16 November 2016 Malloch was interviewed by Evan Davis on the BBC's Newsnight program in connection with the reported likelihood of his being appointed by then US President-Elect Donald Trump to an unspecified role. Malloch stated that he had been extensively consulted by Trump throughout the Presidential election campaign. Bloomberg reported that this position could be the US Ambassador to the European Union, which caused strong reactions in the European Parliament. Malloch first met Trump in the 1980s in Palm Beach, Florida.

On 30 November 2016, Malloch was part of a live panel discussion titled "Trump: An American Tragedy?", part of the British series Intelligence Squared that aims to provoke debate and intelligent discussion. At the video-recorded event, Malloch became irked by another panelist's assertion that then President-Elect "Donald Trump lies on Twitter every day." Malloch took the position that former President Barack Obama had lied every day on Twitter. Other panelists and the large audience disagreed with Malloch's statement: "I said we've had a president who's lied every day on Twitter for eight years." The moderator Jonathan Freedland restated Malloch's position, asking for clarification, "You think Obama's lied every day?" Malloch's answer prompted dissent from others in attendance when he stated, "Absolutely. I know he's a great favourite in London. [...] He came over here and tried to get people to vote against Brexit." Freedland's position, also repeated by other panelists, was, "That's not a lie. I mean, urging people to vote on Brexit one way may be unwise, but it wasn't untrue." Malloch sarcastically asked, "It wasn't untrue?" Explaining further, Freedland said, "He offered an opinion. I don't know how that could be untrue." Recognizing the position taken by Malloch, another panelist urged the moderator to "just move on [from this fruitless argument]."

In early February 2017, media reported that Malloch was a leading candidate for ambassadorship to the EU, which prompted unusually strong disapproval from EU politicians. Asked why he wanted to become ambassador to the EU in an interview the month before, Malloch told BBC News: "I had in a previous career a diplomatic post where I helped bring down the Soviet Union. So maybe there's another union that needs a little taming." Malloch was a vocal supporter of UK withdrawal from the EU and has expressed his view that the euro would collapse. On Bloomberg TV Malloch stated that he hoped all EU members would hold referendums on whether to leave the bloc. In an interview with Greek television, Malloch expressed his view that Greece will soon need to leave the euro. When asked about the future of the euro in the next decade, he remarked that his "sense is that the euro is in a real problem zone, there would be parity with the dollar and there could potentially—given political situations around Europe—even be a euro collapse."

Malloch has appeared several times as a guest in productions of the website InfoWars. In the video "Davos Group Insider Exposes The Globalist Luciferian Agenda", he says:

The EU is part of, of course, the globalist Empire, the New World Order. I think many of its origins are in fact quite evil ...

It's basically a German takeover of Europe making Europe into its own puppet state with its crony capitalism and its fake currency of the Euro. ... Luciferianism is a belief system that venerates the essential characteristics that are affixed to Lucifer. That tradition has been informed by Gnosticism by Satanism and it usually refers to Lucifer not as the devil per se but as some kind of liberator, some kind of guardian, some kind of guiding spirit, in fact is the true God as opposed to Jehovah. ... of course we know who Lucifer is and he's seen as one of the morning stars, as a symbol of enlightenment,

as a kind of independence, and of true human progress, turning away from God and turning to Lucifer in order to enlighten yourself.

CNN reported in March 2018 that Malloch has written a forthcoming book alleging a "deep state" within the United States government fabricated the Steele dossier to destroy Trump.

=== Controversy and allegations ===
In February 2017, the Financial Times reported that Ted Malloch embellished or falsified seven claims in his memoir Davos, Aspen & Yale: My Life Behind the Elite Curtain as a Global Sherpa. The alleged false claims include his documentary being Emmy-nominated, that he had written for The New York Times and Washington Post, that he held a professorship at Oxford University, and that he had completed his "doctoral programme" in less than three years. In the book, Malloch claimed that he was "knighted in the Sovereign Order of St John by the Queen, Elizabeth II herself". The Financial Times claimed he was actually awarded a medal of St. John which is not awarded in an investiture attended by the Queen, while Malloch later responded that he was inducted into the Sovereign Order of St John and has "a letter stating ... the award comes through The Queen". Malloch had also claimed that The Lord Lyon of Scotland awarded him as a Laird his coat of arms in 2006; however, the Financial Times quoted the Clerk of the Court of the Lord Lyon, as saying "Lord Lyon does not, nor could he, create a person a laird".

The Financial Times also obtained bankruptcy court records revealing that a US court had found that Malloch had overstated his assets on loan applications with the intent to deceive the banks into making multi-million dollar loans; the couple had claimed assets of £36.3 million when applying for the loans, but claimed they had just $152,000 at the time of their 2013 bankruptcy petition and were unable to repay $5.9 million in outstanding debt.

NBC News reported on March 30, 2018, that Malloch, who had worked with the Donald Trump presidential campaign, had been detained and questioned by the FBI two days earlier as he arrived at Boston Logan Airport after a flight from London. He was served with a subpoena to appear for questioning by Robert Mueller's Special Counsel investigators on April 13, and presented with a warrant to have his phone seized and searched. Malloch told NBC in an email that FBI agents asked him a variety of questions, including about Trump associate Roger Stone, author Jerome Corsi, and WikiLeaks. During the FBI questioning, Malloch phoned Corsi. Corsi was subpoenaed for questioning by Mueller's investigators in September 2018, and by November he was facing perjury charges. That month, a draft court filing showed Corsi and Stone had exchanged emails in summer 2016 indicating their knowledge of impending email "dumps" by WikiLeaks. In one email, Stone directed Corsi to contact Assange, which Corsi told investigators he had ignored, although investigators found he had passed the directive to an associate in London, whom Corsi later identified as Malloch. In March 2018, Malloch denied ever visiting the Ecuadorian Embassy in London where Julian Assange was residing and denied knowing about any WikiLeaks material related to the Russian interference in the 2016 United States elections.

Malloch asserted in his autobiography that former British prime minister Margaret Thatcher called him a "genius" and a "global sherpa" in a 1992 address. The Financial Times reported that a video of the address does not show Thatcher making such comments. Malloch also claimed in his book that a PBS documentary he had produced “was nominated for an Emmy Award,” although the Academy of Television Arts & Sciences could not find a record of that.

Having worked in State Department and UN roles during the late 1980s and early 1990s, Malloch has asserted he “helped bring down the Soviet Union.” He stated that his position at the United Nations Economic Commission for Europe was “ambassadorial-level,” although US and UN officials disputed that.

== Published works ==
- Beyond Reductionism: Ideology and the Science of Politics (1982, Irvington Publishers; ISBN 9780829013221)
- Where Are We Now?: The State of Christian Political Reflection (1983, University Press of America; ISBN 9780819117403)
- Issues in International Trade and Development Policy (1987, Praeger; ISBN 978-0275923563)
- Unleashing the Power of Perpetual Learning, with Donald Norris (1997, Society for College and University Planning; ISBN 9780960160877)
- Renewing American Culture: The Pursuit of Happiness (Conflicts and Trends in Business Ethics), with Scott Massey (2006, M & M Scrivener Press; ISBN 978-0976404118)
- Being Generous (2009, Templeton Press; ISBN 978-1599473161)
- Spiritual Enterprise: Doing Virtuous Business. (2008, Encounter Books; ISBN 978-1594032226)
- Thrift: Rebirth of a Forgotten Virtue (2009, Encounter Books; ISBN 978-1594032608)
- Doing Virtuous Business: The Remarkable Success of Spiritual Enterprise (2011), Thomas Nelson; ISBN 9780849947179
- America’s Spiritual Capital, with Nicholas Capaldi (2012, St. Augustine's Press; ISBN 9781587310379)
- The End of Ethics and a Way Back: How to Fix a Fundamentally Broken Global Financial System, with Jordan Mamorsky (2013, Wiley; ISBN 9781118550175)
- Practical Wisdom in Management: Business Across Spiritual Traditions (2015, Greenleaf / Academy of Business in Society; ISBN 9781783531318)
- Davos, Aspen & Yale: My Life Behind the Elite Curtain as a Global Sherpa (2016, WND Books; ISBN 9781944229054)
- Hired: An Insider's Look at Trump's Victory (2017, WND Books; ISBN 9781942475477)
- The Plot to Destroy Trump: How the Deep State Fabricated the Russian Dossier to Subvert the President (2018, Skyhorse Publishing, ISBN 9781510740105)

== See also ==
- Timeline of investigations into Trump and Russia (January–June 2018)
- Timeline of investigations into Trump and Russia (July–December 2018)
