= James Rybicki =

American federal government official

James "Jim" Rybicki
- Known for: Chief of Staff to FBI Director James Comey
- Police career
- Branch: United States Capitol Police, United States Department of Justice, Federal Bureau of Investigation

James "Jim" Rybicki is an American federal government official who formerly worked in the United States Department of Justice (DOJ) and Federal Bureau of Investigation (FBI).

== Biography ==
Rybicki has a J.D. degree, and formerly worked as an officer in the United States Capitol Police before he began working at the DOJ in 2001. He worked in various departments at the DOJ, including the National Security Division, the Office of Intelligence Policy and Review, and the United States Attorney's Office for the United States District Court for the Eastern District of Virginia.

=== Career at the FBI ===
Rybicki served as chief of staff to then-director of the FBI James Comey when President Donald Trump fired Comey from this position in May 2017. He continued to serve as chief of staff to Comey's successor, Christopher A. Wray, until January 2018, when Wray replaced him with Zachary Harmon.

=== Role in Clinton email investigation ===
As Comey's chief of staff, Rybicki had been scrutinized by Congressional Republicans over his role in the FBI's investigation of the Hillary Clinton email controversy. In October 2017, the FBI released an email he had sent to several other FBI officials in May 2016, in which he stated, "Please send me any comments on this statement so we may roll into a master doc for discussion with the Director at a future date." The release of this email shows that drafts of Comey's statement on the Clinton investigation has been prepared months before he had interviewed Clinton herself. Congressional Republicans sought for Rybicki to testify on the Clinton investigation for months, with some of them suggesting that his testimony might vindicate Trump's decision to fire Comey. These efforts culminated in Rybicki testifying before Congress on the investigation the week before he left the FBI.

Soon after Rybicki's departure, speculation ensued as to whether he had been forced out due to pressure from Congressional Republicans. Despite this speculation, federal law enforcement officials said that Rybicki was not fired or forced out from his job at the FBI; instead, such officials told Fox News that Rybicki's departure had already been planned for some time. Similarly, Wray said in a statement to CNN that Rybicki's departure from the FBI was voluntary, stating that "Jim Rybicki notified me last month that he will be leaving the FBI to accept an opportunity in the corporate sector."
