= Shlomo Weber =

- Born: 2 September 1949 (age 77); Moscow, USSR

Academic background
- Education: Moscow State University, Hebrew University of Jerusalem

Academic work
- Discipline: Game theory, political economy and public economics, diversity
- Institutions: New Economic School
- Awards: Alexander von Humboldt Research Prize for Outstanding Foreign Scientists

Shlomo Weber (born 2 September 1949) is an economics professor and president, New Economic School in Moscow, Russia; Academic Director of the Center for Study of Diversity and Social Interactions at NES; Robert H. and Nancy Dedman Trustee Professor of Economics Department of Economics, Southern Methodist University.

His main research interests are diversity, game theory and political economy, though also public economics and economy of the former USSR, of Eastern Europe and Central Asia have been noted.

== Education ==
Weber earned a degree of Master of Science in mathematics from the Moscow State University in 1971. Eight years later at the Hebrew University in Jerusalem, Israel, he became a Doctor of Philosophy in mathematical economics. He is a professor in economics, since 1993 affiliated with the Southern Methodist University (SMU) in Dallas, Texas, U.S. and has Canadian and American citizenships. He also serves on the board of trustees at Graduate School of Economics and Management of UrFU.

== Career ==
Weber's teaching experience includes political economy, microeconomic theory, welfare economics, industrial organization, microfoundations of macroeconomics, principles of economics, price theory, public choice, public economics, game theory, social choice, advanced economic analysis, mathematical analysis for economists, operations research.

Between 1980 and 1986 Shlomo Weber had been a lecturer, visiting scholar, senior lecturer, associate professor or visiting associate professor at departments of economics of universities in Israel (Haifa), the USA (Yale, Institute for Mathematics in Social Sciences at Stanford), and Canada (U of T, York). At the latter university he was Professor of Economics from 1987 till 1993 though in 1990–91 visiting professor at the University of Bonn in Germany.

Whilst affiliated with the SMU at which he is a member of several committees, was Chairman of the Department of Economics from 1994 till 2000 and remained Director of the Richard B. Johnson Center for Economic Studies from 1994 till 2007, he was visiting professor at the University of Venice, Italy, in the summers of 1994–95 and obtained further professional experience as visiting professor at the Université catholique de Louvain in Louvain-la-Neuve, Belgium, in 2000–2001, followed by a few months at the California Institute of Technology, Pasadena, USA. He was an Alexander von Humboldt Research Prize holder at the Technical University of Dresden in Germany in 2003, and from 2004 till 2006 the Research Director at the Center for Operations Research and Econometrics (CORE) of the Catholic University in Louvain-la-Neuve.

== Academic awards ==
Weber has won the following awards:

1980-81	Alexander von Humboldt Research Fellow	University of Bonn, Germany.
1992	Visiting E.H.E.S.S. Professorship	DELTA (since 2005 part of PSE), Paris, France.
1993	Alexander von Humboldt Research Fellow	Technical University of Dresden, Germany.
1994	Casa di Risparmio Visiting Professorship	University of Venice, Italy.
1994	Visiting Scholar Tokyo Center for Economic Research	University of Tokyo, Japan.
1995	Casa di Risparmio Visiting Professorship	University of Venice, Italy.
1996	Visiting E.H.E.S.S. Professorship	GREQAM, France.
1996	SEW - EURODRIVE Foundation Visiting Professorship	Dresden, Germany.
2000	Japanese Society for Promotion of Science Fellowship	Tokyo, Japan.
2002	Alexander von Humboldt Research Prize for Outstanding Foreign Scientists	Technical University of Dresden, Germany.
2004	Visiting E.H.E.S.S. Professorship	University of Toulouse, France.
2013	Winner of the National Megagrant Competition,3rd wave, The Ministry of Education and Science.	Russian Federation

== Publications (selection) ==
More than a hundred articles by Shlomo Weber have been published in scientific journals on economics and on political sciences

=== Co-authored ===
- Masahisa Fujita and Shlomo Weber, discussion paper: On Labor Complementarity, Cultural Frictions and Strategic Immigration Policies (2004, Institute of Developing Economies)
- Michel le Breton and Shlomo Weber, Stability of coalition structures and the principle of optimal partitioning
- Michel le Breton and Shlomo Weber, Stable Partitions in a Model with Group-Dependent Feasible Sets (2003)
- Michel Le Breton, Shlomo Weber, journal article: The Art of Making Everybody Happy : How to Prevent a Secession (IMF Staff Papers, Vol. 50, 2003)
- Klaus Desmet, Ignacio Ortuño-Ortín and Shlomo Weber, paper: Peripheral Diversity and Redistribution (2005)
- Hideo Konishi, Michel le Breton and Shlomo Weber, Group formation in games without spillovers
- Victor A. Ginsburgh and Shlomo Weber, article: La dynamique des langues en Belgique (The Dynamics of languages in Belgium) (2006)
- Victor Ginsburgh and Sheila Weyers: Economics of Literary Translation: A Simple Theory and Evidence; CEPR Discussion Paper No. 6432 (August 2007) ISSN 0265-8003; Centre for Economic Policy Research, London
- Victor Ginsburgh: How Many Languages Do We Need? The Economics of Linguistic Diversity, Princeton University Press, Princeton/Woodstock 2011 ISBN 978-0-691-13689-9
- Jean J. Gabszewicz, Victor A. Ginsburgh and Shlomo Weber, article: Bilingualism and Communicative Benefits (2005) Victor A. Ginsburgh, Ignacio *Ortuño-Ortín and Shlomo Weber, article: Why Do People Learn Foreign Languages? (2005)
- Victor A. Ginsburgh, Ignacio Ortuño-Ortín and Shlomo Weber, article: Disenfranchisement in linguistically diverse societies. The case of the European Union (2005)

=== Seminars ===
- 17 March 2005 Shlomo Weber (CORE), "The Rawlsian Principle and Secession-Proofness in Large Heterogeneous Societies". See announcement, in a series of weekly seminars organized by the Unit of Economic Analysis of the Universitat Autònoma de Barcelona (part of the Department of Economics and Economic History), jointly with the IAE.

== See also ==
- JEL classification codes
