= Topics of the Mueller special counsel investigation =

The Mueller special counsel investigation was started by Deputy Attorney General Rod Rosenstein, who was serving as Acting Attorney General due to the recusal of Attorney General Jeff Sessions. He authorized Robert Mueller to investigate and prosecute "any links and/or coordination between the Russian government and individuals associated with the campaign of President Donald Trump", as well as "any matters that arose or may arise directly from the investigation" and any other matters within the scope of 28 CFR 600.4 – Jurisdiction.

The investigation's broad scope allowed Mueller to investigate many topics, including: Russian election interference; links between Trump associates and Russian officials; alleged collusion between Trump campaign and Russian agents; potential obstruction of justice; financial investigations; lobbyists; Trump as a subject of investigation; other topics; and the Facebook–Cambridge Analytica data scandal.

== Russian election interference ==
Internet Research Agency indictment from February 2018

In late-July 2016, the FBI opened counterintelligence investigations into four Americans who had contact with Trump to determine whether they might have coordinated or cooperated with Russia's activities. Those investigations became part of the Special Counsel's portfolio.

Among the U.S. intelligence agencies, the Federal Bureau of Investigation and the Central Intelligence Agencies in January 2017 concluded "with high confidence" (and the National Security Agency with "moderate confidence") that the Russian government interfered in the election by hacking into the computer servers of the Democratic National Committee (DNC) and the personal Gmail account of Clinton campaign chairman John Podesta and forwarding their contents to WikiLeaks, as well as by disseminating fake news promoted on social media, and by penetrating, or trying to penetrate, the election systems and databases of multiple U.S. states. de Volkskrant reported on January 25, 2018, that Dutch intelligence agency AIVD had penetrated the Russian hacking group Cozy Bear in 2014 and in 2015 observed them hack the State Department and White House in real time, as well as capturing the images of the hackers via a security camera in their workspace. The New York Times reported on July 18, 2018, that American, British and Dutch intelligence services had observed stolen DNC emails on Russian military intelligence networks. NBC News reported on March 1, 2018, that Mueller was assembling a case for criminal charges against Russians who carried out the hacking and leaking. Those charges were brought on July 13, 2018.

Russia's influence on U.S. voters through social media is a primary focus of the Mueller investigation. Mueller used a search warrant to obtain detailed information about Russian ad purchases on Facebook. According to a former federal prosecutor, the warrant means that a judge was convinced that foreigners had illegally contributed to influencing a US election via Facebook Ads.

On February 13, 2018, in testimony before the Senate Intelligence Committee, the heads of the top six American intelligence agencies unanimously reaffirmed Russian interference. Three sources familiar with Trump's thinking told CNN he remains unconvinced that Russia interfered because it suggests he didn't win the election solely on his own merits.

During a July 16, 2018, press conference at the 2018 Russia–United States Summit in Helsinki, Finland, President Putin was asked, "did you want President Trump to win the election and did you direct any of your officials to help him do that?" Putin replied, "Yes, I did. Yes, I did. Because he talked about bringing the US-Russia relationship back to normal."

The Mueller Report concluded while there was no evidence that the Trump campaign conspired with Russia to influence the election, the Russian government did attempt to influence the election in Trump's favor by hacking Democratic political organizations and spreading "disinformation and social media" discord.

== Links between Trump associates and Russian officials ==
As early as spring 2015, American intelligence agencies started overhearing conversations in which Russian government officials, some within the Kremlin, discussed associates of Trump, then a presidential candidate.

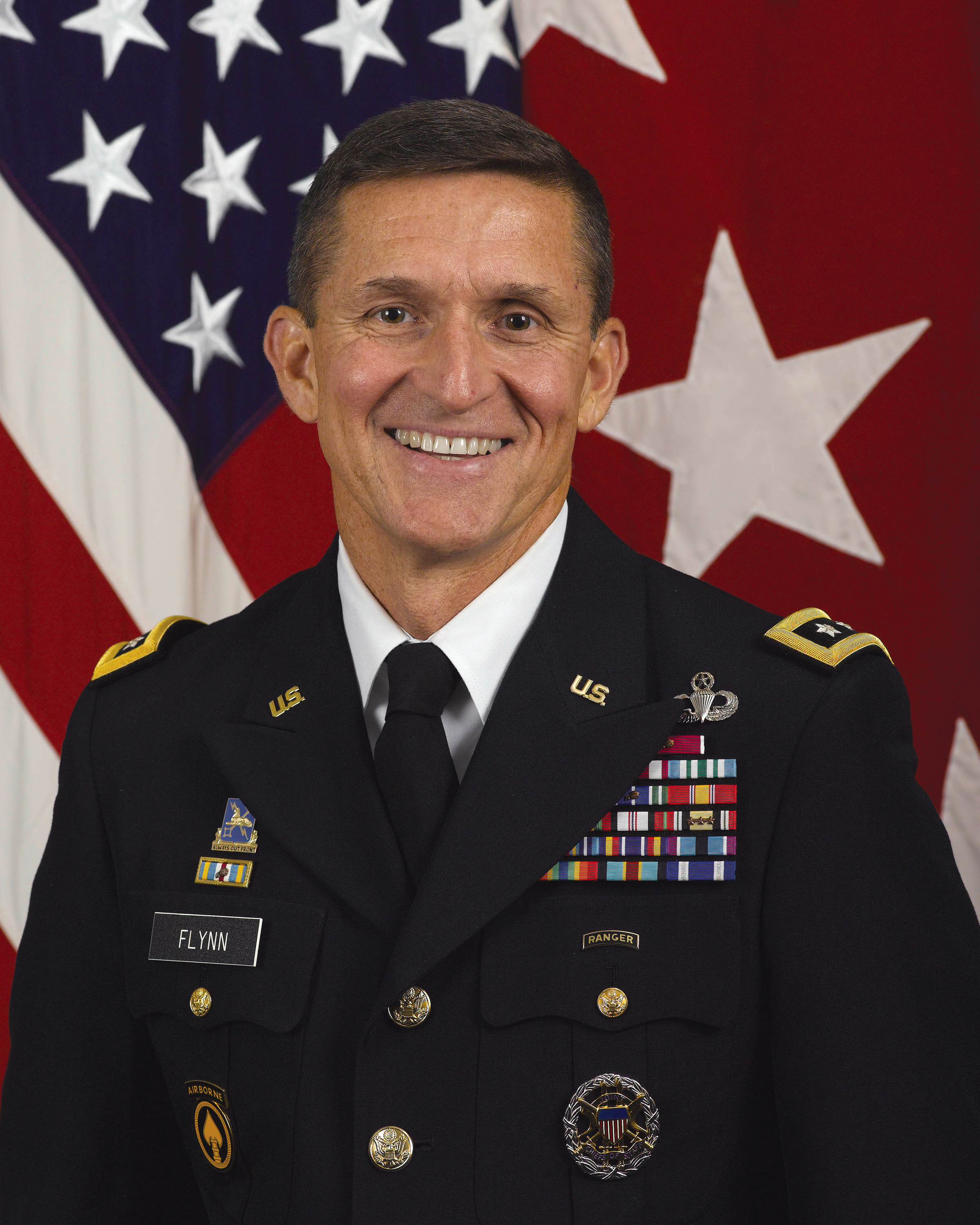
Michael Flynn served as the 24th United States National Security Advisor from January to February 2017

The New York Times reported on February 14, 2017, that phone records and communications intercepts showed that Trump associates—including members of the Trump campaign—had "repeated contacts" with senior Russian intelligence officials during the 2016 campaign. Paul Manafort was the only Trump associate who was specifically identified as participating in these communications. In addition, some senior Trump associates, including Kushner, Trump Jr., Sessions, Flynn and Manafort, had direct contacts with Russian officials during 2016. In congressional testimony the following June, Comey stated the Times report was "in the main" not true. The Times reported that during the intervening months, its sources continued to believe the reporting was "solid." In July 2020, the Senate Judiciary Committee released notes taken contemporaneously with the Times report by FBI Counterintelligence Division chief Peter Strzok indicating his skepticiam about the Times' reporting, writing, “We have not seen evidence of any officials associated with the Trump team in contact with [intelligence officers]" and "“We are unaware of ANY Trump advisors engaging in conversations with Russian intelligence officials.” The Times stood by its account, subsequently reporting that the released notes did not provide a fully accurate representation of Strzok's knowledge. Michael Flynn was forced to resign as National Security Advisor on February 13, 2017, after it was revealed that on December 29, 2016, the day that Obama announced sanctions against Russia, Flynn had discussed the sanctions with Russian ambassador Kislyak. Flynn had earlier acknowledged speaking to Kislyak but denied discussing the sanctions. Also in December 2016, Flynn and presidential advisor Jared Kushner met with Kislyak hoping to set up a direct, secure line of communication with Russian officials about which American intelligence agencies would be unaware. Jared Kushner also met with Sergei Gorkov, the head of the Russian state-owned bank Vnesheconombank (VEB), which has been subject to U.S. economic sanctions since July 2014. Flynn and Kushner failed to report these meetings on their security clearance forms.

The Trump Organization pursued a luxury hotel and condominium project in Moscow—dubbed the Trump Tower Moscow—during the Trump presidential campaign. This project was facilitated by Michael Cohen, then an attorney for the Trump Organization, and from January 2017 to May 2018 Trump's personal attorney. Trump signed a nonbinding "letter of intent" dated October 13, 2015, to proceed with the project. The letter, also signed by Russian investor Andrei Rozov, was forwarded to Cohen by Russian-American real estate developer Felix Sater, who had worked with The Trump Organization on prior deals, including Trump SoHo and Trump International Hotel & Residence. Sater has also been involved in criminal activities involving organized crime and has served as an informant to the FBI relating to those activities. He boasted to Cohen about his connections to Vladimir Putin, saying in an email to Cohen on November 13, 2015, "Buddy our boy can become president of the USA and we can engineer it. I will get all of Putins [sic] team to buy in on this. I will manage this process." He also asserted that he had secured financing for the project through the Russian state-owned VTB Bank, which was under sanctions by the United States government. Cohen emailed Putin spokesman Dmitry Peskov in January 2016 to request assistance in advancing the project and later stated he didn't recall receiving a response. Cohen told the Senate Intelligence Committee in September 2017 that the deal was abandoned in January 2016, but in November 2018 admitted in a guilty plea that he had minimized Trump's role in the plans "to be consistent with [Trump's] political messaging" and that negotiations had actually extended through June 2016. Cohen also admitted that Peskov's office had, in fact, replied to his January 2016 email and discussed the deal with him on the phone. In a sentencing memorandum filed the day after his guilty plea, Cohen's attorneys stated he kept Trump "apprised" of the "substantive conversation" Cohen had with the Russian official, and discussed with Trump traveling to Russia to advance the project during the summer of 2016. BuzzFeed News reported on March 12, 2018, that Mueller's investigators had questioned Sater, and on April 13, 2018, reported that a former Russian spy had helped secure financing for the project. In 2010, Sater was provided business cards describing himself as "Senior Advisor to Donald Trump" with an email address at TrumpOrg.com. In a 2013 sworn affidavit, Trump said "If [Sater] were sitting in the room right now, I really wouldn't know what he looked like," and in 2015 he stated "Felix Sater, boy, I have to even think about it. I'm not that familiar with him."

The Trump team issued multiple denials of any contacts between Trump associates and Russia, but in sixteen cases those denials turned out to be false. On December 4, 2017, in a court filing requesting that the judge revoke Manafort's bond agreement, prosecutors stated that Paul Manafort had worked with a Russian intelligence official to draft an op-ed essay while he was out on bail.

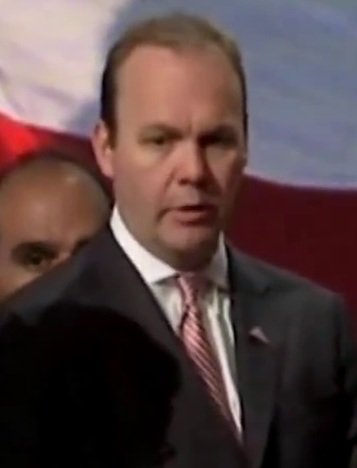
Rick Gates at the 2016 Republican National Convention

The New York Times reported, on March 28, 2018, that former Trump campaign deputy chairman Rick Gates had, in September and October 2016, frequently communicated with a man that the FBI believes is a former agent of GRU, Russia's largest foreign intelligence agency, and who had maintained active links with Russian intelligence during these communications; this disclosure was written into a court sentencing document for Alex van der Zwaan, submitted by Robert Mueller. Identified in the document as "Person A", The Times reported that the man matched the description of Konstantin Kilimnik, who, for years, was Paul Manafort's "right-hand man" in Ukraine. Gates reportedly told an associate that he knew "Person A" was a former GRU agent, although Manafort told associates he was not aware of such a connection. The Times reported on January 8, 2019, that in spring 2016 Gates and Manafort gave polling data, some of which was private to the Trump campaign, to Kilimnik, asking he pass it to Ukrainians Serhiy Lyovochkin and Rinat Akhmetov. During a closed-door court hearing on February 4, 2019, regarding false statements Manafort had made to investigators about his communications with Kilimnik, special counsel prosecutor Andrew Weissmann told judge Amy Berman Jackson that "This goes, I think, very much to the heart of what the special counsel's office is investigating," suggesting that Mueller's office continued to examine a possible agreement between Russia and the Trump campaign.

Reuters reported on March 29, 2018, that the special counsel is examining an event at the 2016 Republican National Convention at which Jeff Sessions had conversations with Russian ambassador Sergei Kislyak. Investigators are also looking into how and why language deemed hostile to Russia was removed from the Republican party's platform document during the convention. Mueller's office is also inquiring whether Sessions had private conversations with Kislyak at a Trump speech at the Mayflower Hotel in April 2016.

The Steele dossier asserted that Trump attorney Michael Cohen in August 2016 had a clandestine meeting with Kremlin representatives in Prague. Cohen has stated he has never been to Prague, inviting investigators to examine his passport. McClatchy reported on April 13, 2018, that Mueller's investigators have evidence that in August or early September 2016 Cohen traveled to Prague by way of Germany. Such a trip would not have required a passport as Germany and the Czech Republic are in the Schengen Area which has abolished passport and all other types of border control at their mutual borders. On April 14, 2018, Cohen again denied he had ever been to Prague, although weeks after the 2016 election he had told journalist David Corn he had been in Prague fourteen years earlier. McClatchy reported in December 2018 that a mobile phone traced to Cohen had "pinged" cellphone towers around Prague in late summer 2016. McClatchy also reported that during that time an eastern European intelligence agency had intercepted communications between Russians, one of whom mentioned that Cohen was in Prague. The Mueller Report did not conclude Cohen had been in Prague, citing his testimony to investigators.

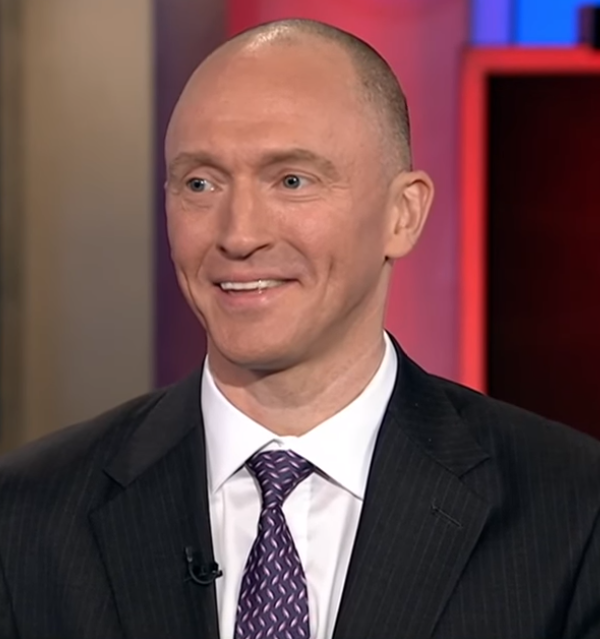
Carter Page on Hardball with Chris Matthews

On July 21, 2018, the Justice Department released a heavily redacted version of the October 2016 FISA warrant application for Carter Page, which stated in part "The FBI believes that Page has been collaborating and conspiring with the Russian government" and "the FBI believes that the Russian government's efforts are being coordinated with Page and perhaps other individuals associated with Candidate #1's campaign." The application also stated

[A]ccording to Source #1, Divyekin [who is assessed as Igor Nikolayevich Divyekin] had met secretly with Page and that their agenda for the meeting included Divyekin raising a dossier or "kompromat" that the Kremlin possessed on Candidate #2 and the possibility of it being released to Candidate #1's campaign.

The Steele dossier asserted that Page had secretly met "senior Kremlin Internal Affairs official, DIVYEKIN" in Moscow on "either 7 or 8 July" of 2016, while Page was still officially with the Trump campaign, but did not refer to any kompromat.

== Alleged collusion between Trump campaign and Russian agents ==
=== 2016 ===
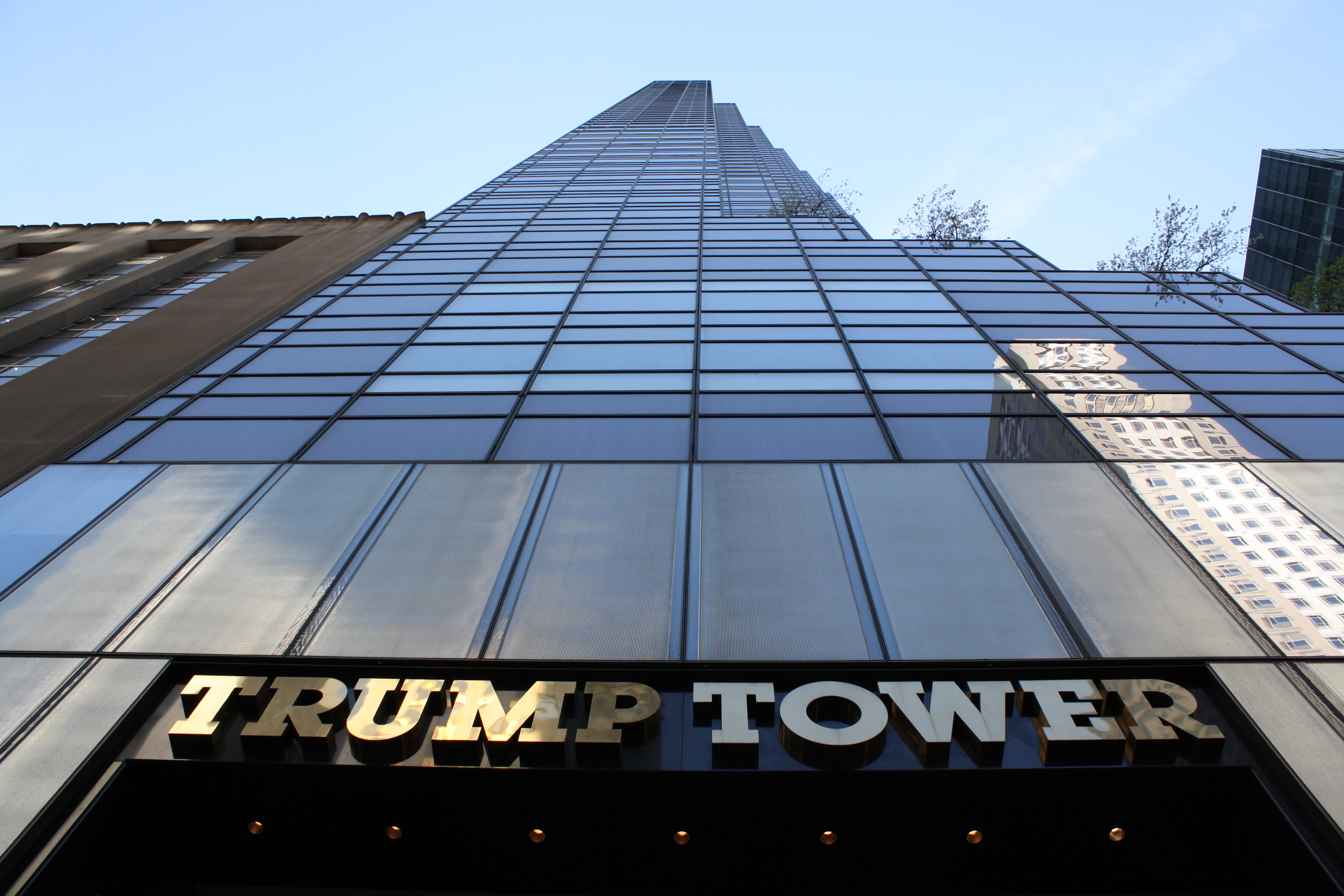
Trump Tower, Manhattan, site of the meeting on June 9, 2016

Mueller investigated the meeting on June 9, 2016, in Trump Tower in New York City between three senior members of Trump's presidential campaign—Kushner, Manafort, and Donald Trump Jr.—and at least five other people, including Russian lawyer Natalia Veselnitskaya, Rinat Akhmetshin, a lobbyist and former Soviet army officer who met senior Trump campaign aides, Ike Kaveladze, British publicist Rob Goldstone, and translator Anatoli Samochornov. Goldstone had suggested the meeting to Trump Jr., and it was arranged in a series of emails later made public. In one email exchange of June 3, 2016, Goldstone wrote Trump Jr. that Aras Agalarov "offered to provide the Trump campaign with some official documents and information that would incriminate Hillary and her dealings with Russia and would be very useful to your father", adding that it was "very high level and sensitive information but is part of Russia and its government's support for Mr. Trump" that he could send to Donald Trump's assistant Rhona Graff. Trump Jr. responded minutes later "Thanks Rob I appreciate that" and "if it's what you say I love it." Trump Jr. initially told the press that the meeting was held to discuss adoptions of Russian children by Americans, but after contrary media reports he added that he agreed to the meeting with the understanding that he would receive information damaging to Hillary Clinton. Mueller's team investigated the emails and the meeting, and whether President Trump later tried to hide the meeting's purpose. On July 18, 2017, Kaveladze's attorney said that Mueller's investigators were seeking information about the meeting in June 2016 from his client, and on July 21, Mueller asked the White House to preserve all documents related to the meeting. It has been reported that Manafort had made notes during the meeting. CNN reported on July 26, 2018, that anonymous sources stated that Michael Cohen was prepared to tell the Mueller investigation that Trump was aware of and approved of the June 9, 2016, meeting in advance, which Trump and Trump Jr. have repeatedly denied. CNN reported in the same story that Cohen attorney Lanny Davis had declined to comment for the report. The following day, The Washington Post reported a similar story coming from one anonymous source, although the paper did not specifically mention Russians. One month later, Davis identified himself as that source, clarifying that he could not be certain of Cohen's knowledge in the matter. Davis also asserted he had been a source for the CNN story. A CNN spokeswoman stated, "We stand by our story, and are confident in our reporting of it."

CNN reported on March 23, 2017, that the FBI was examining "human intelligence, travel, business and phone records and accounts of in-person meetings" indicating that Trump associates may have coordinated with "suspected Russian operatives" to release information damaging to the Hillary Clinton campaign.

=== 2017 ===
By August 3, 2017, Mueller had impaneled a grand jury in the District of Columbia that issued subpoenas concerning the meeting. The Financial Times reported on August 31 that Akhmetshin had given sworn testimony to Mueller's grand jury.

CNN reported on September 19, 2017, that Manafort had been a target of a FISA wiretap both before and after the 2016 election, extending into early 2017. Some of the intercepted communications caused concerns among investigators that Manafort had solicited assistance from Russians for the campaign, although the evidence was reportedly inconclusive. The wiretaps began sometime after Manafort became a subject of an FBI investigation into his business practices in 2014. The Mueller investigation was provided details of these intercepts.

Mueller is investigating ties between the Trump campaign and Republican activist Peter W. Smith, who stated that he tried to obtain Hillary Clinton's emails from Russian hackers, and that he was acting on behalf of Michael Flynn and other senior Trump campaign members. Trump campaign officials have denied that Smith was working with them. In fall 2017, Mueller's team interviewed former Government Communications Headquarters cybersecurity researcher Matt Tait, who had been approached by Smith to verify the authenticity of emails allegedly hacked from Clinton's private email server. Tait reportedly told House Intelligence Committee investigators in October 2017 that he believed Smith had ties to members of Trump's inner circle—including Flynn, Steve Bannon, and Kellyanne Conway—and may have been helping build opposition research for the Trump campaign. Smith committed suicide in May 2017, several days after talking to The Wall Street Journal about his alleged efforts. Aged 81 and reportedly in failing health, he left a carefully prepared file of documents, including a statement police called a suicide note. An attorney for Smith's estate said in October 2017 that some of Smith's documents had been turned over to the Senate Intelligence Committee. The Wall Street Journal reported on October 7, 2018, that Smith had raised at least $100,000 from donors in his pursuit of the Clinton emails, that his estate had provided documents to the Mueller investigation, and that associates of Smith had been questioned by Mueller's investigators or a grand jury. The Wall Street Journal reported on October 10, 2018, that Smith had established a "professional relationship" with Flynn as early as 2015, and during the campaign was using Flynn's contacts to assist with his search for the Clinton emails. The Journal reported on October 19, 2018, that the Mueller investigation has evidence Smith may have had prior knowledge of the Guccifer 2.0 hacks. The Mueller report later confirmed significant aspects of Smith's efforts to locate the Clinton emails, including his communications about it with Flynn and campaign co-chair Sam Clovis, as well as Flynn's actions to spearhead the effort at Trump's repeated requests. In May 2019, an unredacted version of a December 2018 government sentencing memo for Flynn showed he had advised investigators that members of the Trump campaign had discussed whether to contact WikiLeaks about the release of emails.

In December 2017, it was reported that the Mueller investigation was examining whether the Trump campaign and the Republican National Committee, who worked together on the digital arm of Trump's campaign, provided assistance to Russian trolls attempting to influence voters.

=== 2018 ===
Yahoo News reported that Mueller's team was examining whether the joint RNC–Trump campaign data operation—which was directed on Trump's side by Brad Parscale and managed by Trump's son-in-law Jared Kushner—was related to the activities of Russian trolls and bots aimed at influencing the U.S. electorate. Also that month, the Democratic ranking members of the House Oversight and Judiciary committees asked their respective Republican chairmen to subpoena two of the data firms hired by Trump's campaign for documents related to Russia's election interference, including the firm headed by Parscale. On February 27, 2018, Trump selected Parscale to serve as campaign manager on his 2020 reelection campaign. NBC News reported on February 28, 2018, that Mueller's investigators asked witnesses pointed questions about whether Trump was aware that Democratic emails had been stolen before that was publicly known, and whether he was involved in their strategic release. This is the first reported indication that Mueller's investigation is specifically examining whether Trump was personally involved in collusive activities.

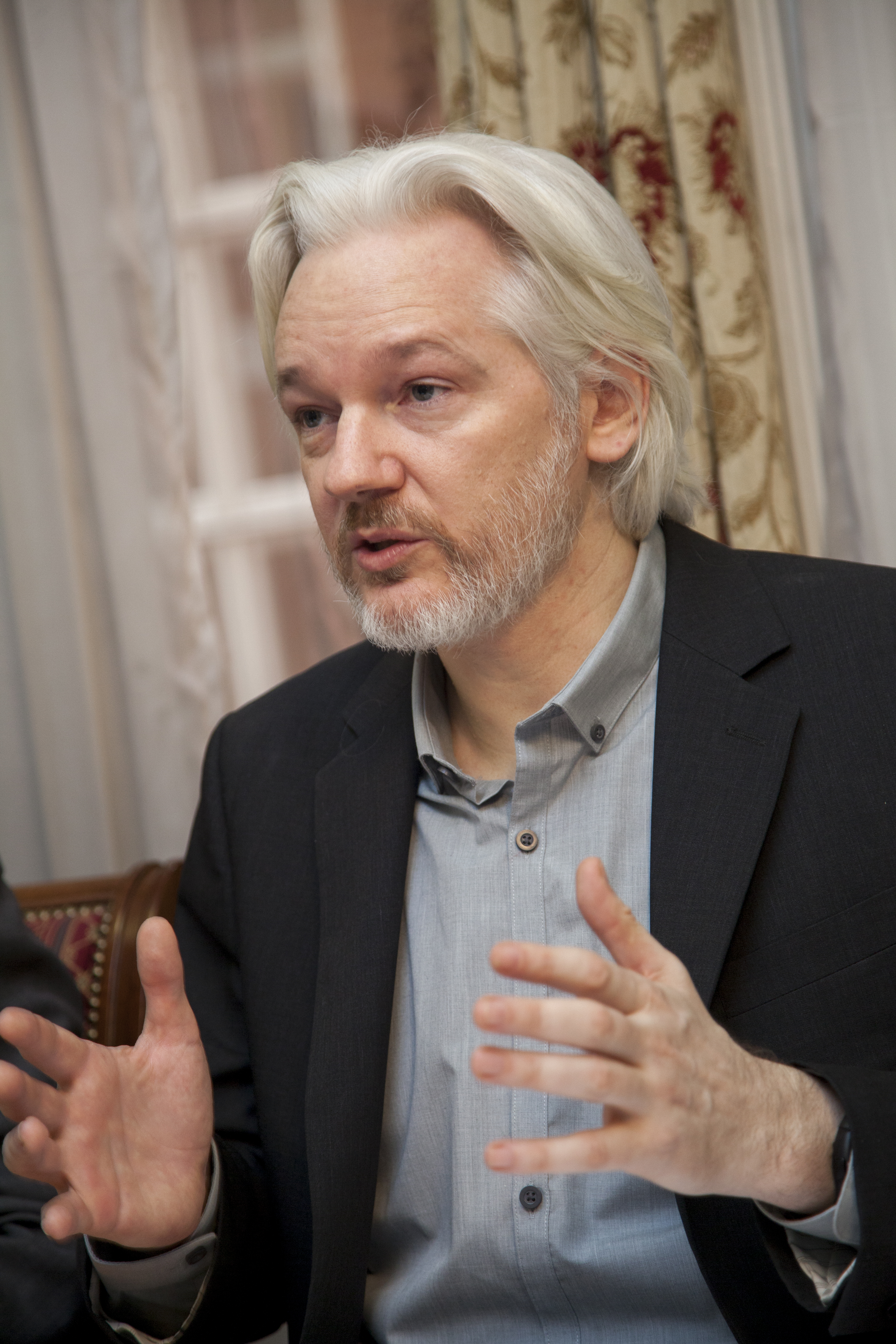
Julian Assange, editor of WikiLeaks

Mueller's investigators also asked about the relationship between Roger Stone and WikiLeaks founder Julian Assange, and why Trump took policy positions favorable to Russia. Stone, a longtime Republican "dirty trickster" and Trump confidant repeatedly discussed his backchannel communications with Assange and claimed knowledge of forthcoming leaks from Wikileaks. He also exchanged Twitter private messages with Guccifer 2.0, which American intelligence connected to two Russian intelligence groups that cybersecurity analysts have concluded hacked Democratic National Committee emails. The New York Times reported on November 1, 2018, that Stone and Steve Bannon exchanged emails in October 2016 about Assange's intent to release documents, and that Bannon and other former senior Trump campaign officials told Mueller's investigators of Stone's assertions that he was a conduit to Wikileaks and seemed aware of imminent document releases, although the "top tier" of the campaign was skeptical of Stone's claims. Reuters reported on May 16, 2018, that Mueller's office subpoenaed Stone's social media strategist, Jason Sullivan, the prior week to testify before a grand jury on May 18 and to provide documents, objects and electronically stored information. Reuters reported the next day that John Kakanis, Stone's driver, accountant and operative, was also subpoenaed.

Investigators also focused on Trump's public comments in July 2016 asking Russia to find emails that were deleted from Hillary Clinton's private email server. At a news conference on July 27, 2016, days after WikiLeaks began publishing the Democratic National Committee emails, Trump said, "Russia, if you're listening, I hope you're able to find the 30,000 emails that are missing." The July 13, 2018, indictment of 12 Russian GRU agents described

...on or about July 27, 2016, the Conspirators attempted after hours to spearphish for the first time email accounts at a domain hosted by a third-party provider and used by Clinton's personal office. At or around the same time, they also targeted seventy-six email addresses at the domain for the Clinton Campaign.

After a "testy March 5 meeting, Mueller's team agreed to provide the president's lawyers with more specific information about the subjects that prosecutors wished to discuss with the president". Then Jay Sekulow "compiled a list of 49 questions that the team believed the president would be asked... The New York Times first reported the existence of the list."

On April 30, 2018, The New York Times published a list of interview questions for Trump that the Mueller investigation had provided to the president's attorneys. The list was provided to The Times by an individual outside Trump's legal team. Among the questions was, "What knowledge did you have of any outreach by your campaign, including by Paul Manafort, to Russia about potential assistance to the campaign?" Before this disclosure, there had been no publicly available information indicating any such outreach. The Times noted that the questions were not quoted verbatim and in some cases were condensed. Written responses to some of the questions were provided to the Mueller investigation on November 20, 2018.

The New York Times reported on May 15, 2018, that Trump campaign policy aide and later White House Deputy Cabinet Secretary John Mashburn testified to the Senate Judiciary Committee in March 2018 that he recalled receiving an email from George Papadopoulos in the first half of 2016 indicating that the Russian government had damaging information about Hillary Clinton. Before this report, there had been no publicly available information indicating that Papadopoulos had informed anyone on the Trump campaign about such matters. Despite an extensive search for the purported email by various investigators, it has not been located. A court document Mueller's office filed in association with Papadopoulos's guilty plea included verbatim quotes from various emails Papadopoulos had sent or received, but the Mashburn email was not referenced in that document.

=== 2019 ===
On March 22, 2019, the Special Counsel submitted their report to Attorney General William Barr. The investigation garnered 199 criminal charges, 37 indictments or guilty pleas, and 5 prison sentences.

On March 24, 2019, Barr sent a four-page letter to Congress detailing the special counsel's findings. The letter was split into 2 sections: The first section discusses Russia's efforts to influence the 2016 U.S. presidential election and the second section details whether Trump obstructed justice.

== Potential obstruction of justice ==
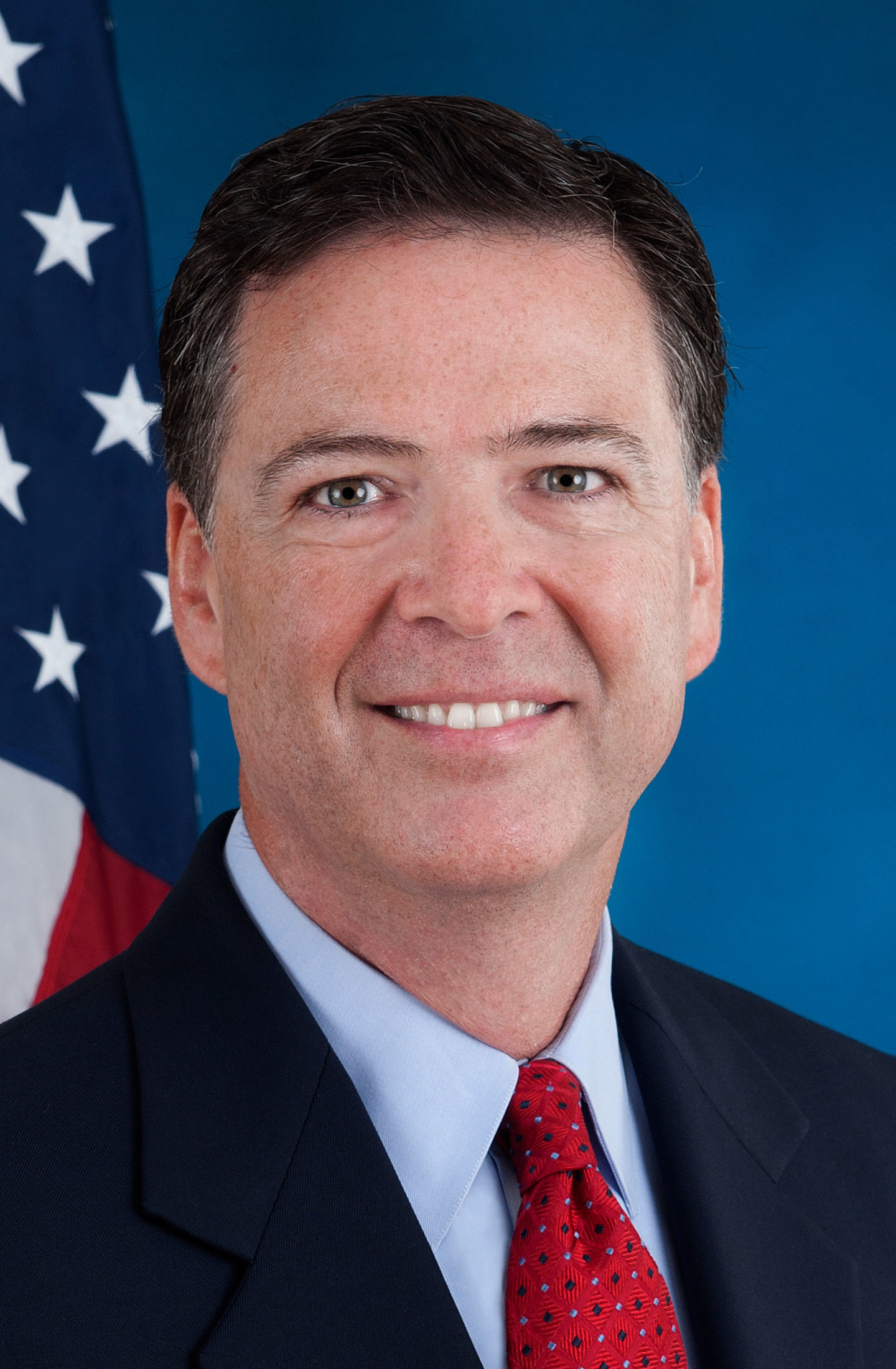
James Comey, former Director of the FBI

Shortly before firing him, Trump asked then-FBI Director James Comey to drop the investigation into a member of the Trump Campaign, former National Security Advisor Flynn. In March, Trump reportedly discussed the FBI's Russia investigation with Director of National Intelligence Dan Coats and then CIA Director Mike Pompeo (who is currently serving as Secretary of State as of April 26, 2018), and asked if they could intervene with Comey to limit or stop it. When he was asked at a Senate Intelligence Committee hearing about the report, Coats said he would not discuss conversations he had with the president but "I have never felt pressured to intervene in the Russia investigation in any way." Before being appointed Director of National Intelligence by Trump, Coats had been an elected Republican politician since 1981, serving in both the House and Senate.

In a May 2017 interview with NBC News anchorman Lester Holt, Trump stated he was thinking of "this Russia thing" when he decided to fire FBI Director James Comey. Trump's statement raised concerns of potential obstruction of justice. In May 2018 Trump denied firing Comey because of the Russia investigation. In August 2018 Trump tweeted that "Holt got caught fudging my tape on Russia", followed by his attorney Jay Sekulow asserting in September 2018 that NBC had edited the Trump interview. Neither Trump nor Sekulow produced evidence that the tape had been modified.

In February 2017, it was reported that White House officials had asked the FBI to issue a statement that there had been no contact between Trump associates and Russian intelligence sources during the 2016 campaign. The FBI did not make the requested statement, and observers noted that the request violated established procedures about contact between the White House and the FBI regarding pending investigations. After Comey revealed in March that the FBI was investigating the possibility of collusion between the Trump campaign and Russia, Trump phoned Coats and Director of National Security Admiral Michael S. Rogers and asked them to publicly state there was no evidence of collusion between his campaign and the Russians. Both Coats and Rogers believed that the request was inappropriate, though not illegal, and did not make the requested statement. The two exchanged notes about the incident, and Rogers made a contemporary memo to document the request. The White House effort to push back publicly on the Russia probe reportedly also included requests to senior lawmakers with access to classified intelligence about Russia, including Senator Richard Burr and Representative Devin Nunes, the chairmen of the Senate and House intelligence committees, respectively.

Ex-FBI Director Comey memo

In May 2017, it was reported that Comey took contemporaneous notes immediately after an Oval Office conversation with Trump on February 14, 2017, in which Trump is described as attempting to persuade Comey to drop the FBI investigation into Flynn. The memo notes that Trump said, "I hope you can see your way clear to letting this go, to letting Flynn go. He is a good guy. I hope you can let this go." Comey made no commitments to Trump on the subject. The White House denied the version of events in the memo, but an FBI agent's contemporaneous notes are widely held up in court as credible evidence of conversations. In testimony to the Senate Intelligence Committee on June 8, Comey gave a detailed report on the February 14 conversation, including Trump's suggestion that he should "let go" the Flynn investigation. Comey said he "took it as a direction… I took it as, this is what he wants me to do." He added that it was "a very disturbing thing, very concerning", and that he discussed the incident with other FBI leaders, including whether an obstruction of justice investigation should be opened. Comey created similar memos about all nine conversations he had with the president. Mueller's office has the Comey memos, but on February 2, 2018, a federal judge denied multiple Freedom of Information Act requests to make the documents public, at least for now.

The FBI launched an investigation of Trump for obstruction of justice a few days after the May 9 firing of Comey. The special prosecutor's office took over the obstruction of justice investigation and has reportedly interviewed Director of National Intelligence Coats, Director of the National Security Agency Rogers, and Deputy Director of the NSA Richard Ledgett. ABC News reported in June that Mueller was gathering preliminary information about possible obstruction of justice, but a full-scale investigation had not been launched. On June 16, Trump tweeted: "I am being investigated for firing the FBI Director by the man who told me to fire the FBI Director! Witch Hunt." However, Trump's lawyer Jay Sekulow said Trump's tweet was referring to the June 14 Washington Post report that he was under investigation for obstruction of justice, and that Trump has not actually been notified of any investigation.

The New York Times and Los Angeles Times reported on September 20, 2017, that Mueller's office had requested information from the White House regarding an Oval Office meeting President Trump had with Russian ambassador Sergey Kislyak and Russian foreign minister Sergey Lavrov on May 10, 2017, during which Trump reportedly said that firing Comey had relieved "great pressure" on him.

On January 23, 2018, The Washington Post reported that Robert Mueller sought to question President Donald Trump about the Flynn and Comey departures.

The Washington Post also reported on January 23, 2018, that Mueller's office is interested in a May 2017 Oval Office conversation between Trump and Andrew McCabe, days after McCabe had automatically become acting director of the FBI when Trump dismissed Comey, allegedly for not pledging loyalty to the president. During this conversation, Trump reportedly asked McCabe for whom he had voted in the 2016 presidential election. McCabe, a lifelong Republican, replied that he had not voted in that election. On January 24, 2018, Trump denied—or did not remember—asking McCabe about his vote. Like Comey, McCabe also took contemporaneous notes of his conversations with Trump, which are reportedly now in the possession of Mueller's office.

The New York Times reported on January 23, 2018, that Attorney General Jeff Sessions was questioned the preceding week by Mueller's investigators. Trump previously expressed frustration that Sessions had recused himself from the investigation and not prevented a Special Counsel from being appointed, stating that he would not have appointed Sessions had he known that would happen. Multiple episodes have been reported in which Trump has threatened to dismiss Sessions, or Sessions has tendered his resignation. The Washington Post reported on February 28, 2018, that the Mueller investigation has been examining a period of time during the summer of 2017 when Trump seemed determined to drive Sessions from his job, to determine "whether those efforts were part of a months-long pattern of attempted obstruction of justice". Sessions' departure would allow Trump to appoint another attorney general who is not restrained by recusal. The New York Times reported on May 29, 2018, that the Mueller investigation is examining a previously unreported March 2017 episode when Trump attempted to persuade Sessions to reverse his recusal, suggesting that the investigation into possible obstruction of justice was broader than previously understood. The questions Mueller's office had previously provided Trump's attorneys for an interview with the president included, "What efforts did you make to try to get [Sessions] to change his mind [about recusal]?"

USA Today and The New York Times reported on January 31, 2018, that Mueller's office is expected to question Mark Corallo, the former spokesman for President Trump's legal team, about his reported concerns that the president and his longtime aide Hope Hicks might have sought to obstruct justice. Corallo reportedly plans to tell investigators that Hicks told President Trump on a conference call that the Trump Jr. emails regarding his meeting with Russians "will never get out". Hicks' attorney denied the allegation. Mueller's investigators reportedly interviewed Hicks in early December 2017. Corallo had resigned from the Trump team in July 2017, reportedly because he became concerned that the president had obstructed justice.

Bloomberg News reported on March 12, 2018, that the obstruction of justice aspect of the investigation is near completion and that Mueller may set it aside to conclude other aspects, such as collusion and hacking.

Superseding indictment of Paul Manafort and Rick Gates alleging tax evasion and bank fraud

The New York Times reported on March 28, 2018, that in 2017, as the Mueller investigation was building its cases against Michael Flynn and Paul Manafort, former Trump attorney John M. Dowd broached the idea of presidential pardons of the men with their attorneys. The Times reported this might have indicated concerns by Trump's legal team about what the men might reveal to investigators if they agreed to cooperate with the investigation in exchange for leniency. Although legal opinions vary as to whether this discussion alone would constitute obstruction of justice, prosecutors might present it as part of a pattern of activity that points to a conspiracy to thwart the investigation. CBS News reported on March 28, 2018, that Manafort is declining a plea deal and proceeding to trial because he is expecting a pardon from Trump, citing "legal sources with knowledge of his strategy". In May 2019, an unredacted version of a December 2018 government sentencing memo for Flynn showed that he advised investigators that both before and after his guilty plea "he or his attorneys received communications from persons connected to the Administration or Congress that could have affected both his willingness to cooperate and the completeness of that cooperation."

In a January 2018 letter to Mueller, Trump's attorneys asserted that Trump cannot unlawfully obstruct justice because the Constitution grants him full authority over all federal investigations and he can "if he wished, terminate the inquiry, or even exercise his power to pardon".

Trump requested and received the resignation of Attorney General Jeff Sessions the day after the 2018 midterm elections, following months of criticizing Sessions for recusing himself from overseeing the Mueller investigation, stating in July 2017, "if he was going to recuse himself, he should have told me before he took the job and I would have picked somebody else." Trump appointed Matthew Whitaker, Sessions' chief of staff since September 2017, as Acting Attorney General. While Whitaker was Sessions' chief of staff, White House chief of staff John Kelly described him as the West Wing's "eyes and ears" in the DOJ, which Trump considered hostile to him. Prior to joining the Justice Department, Whitaker had publicly criticized the Mueller investigation on several occasions, asserting it was "going too far", referring to it as a "lynch mob", and suggested it could be impeded by cutting its budget. Trump had seen Whitaker's supportive commentaries on CNN during the summer of 2017 and that July Whitaker was interviewed by White House counsel Don McGahn to join the Trump legal team as an "attack dog" against Mueller. During an interview with The Daily Caller on November 14, 2018, Trump was asked who he might be considering to assume the permanent attorney general position, mentioning Whitaker. Unprompted, Trump stated, "as far as I'm concerned this is an investigation that should have never been brought...It's an illegal investigation".

Days after Whitaker's appointment, Jerry Nadler, the incoming chairman of the House Judiciary Committee, asserted that Whitaker's appointment was "part of a pattern of obstruction" of the Mueller investigation and that Whitaker would be the first witness called to testify before the Committee. In an interview aired on November 18, 2018, Trump asserted he was unaware of Whitaker's previous criticisms of the Mueller investigation, later referring to one of Whitaker's previous statements, saying "There is no collusion, he happened to be right." Trump added, "I think he's very well aware politically. I think he's astute politically ... He's going to do what's right."

According to a letter from Trump-appointed Attorney General William Barr, no conclusion was reached in the Mueller Report on whether or not Trump obstructed justice. As of March 24, 2019, the report itself has yet to be released.

In May 2019, an unredacted version of a December 2018 government sentencing memo for Flynn showed that he advised investigators of discussions within the Trump campaign involving “potential efforts to interfere with the [special counsel's] investigation.”

== Financial investigations ==
Prosecution's statement of Michael Flynn's offense

The Special Counsel investigation expanded to include Trump's and his associates' financial ties to Russia. The FBI is reviewing the financial records of Trump himself, The Trump Organization, Trump's family members, and his campaign staff, including Trump's real estate activities, which had been under federal scrutiny before the campaign. According to CNN, financial crimes may be easier for investigators to prove than any crimes stemming directly from collusion with Russia. Campaign staff whose finances are under investigation include Manafort, Flynn, Carter Page, and Trump's son-in-law Jared Kushner. At a New York real estate conference in September 2008, Donald Trump Jr. stated: "And in terms of high-end product influx into the US, Russians make up a pretty disproportionate cross-section of a lot of our assets; say in Dubai, and certainly with our project in SoHo and anywhere in New York. We see a lot of money pouring in from Russia." McClatchy reported on April 6, 2018, that Mueller's investigators that week arrived unannounced at the home of an unnamed business associate of the Trump Organization who had worked on foreign deals for the company in recent years. The investigators had warrants for electronic records and to compel sworn testimony, and were reported to be particularly interested in transactions involving Trump's attorney Michael Cohen.

Transactions under investigation include Russian purchases of Trump apartments, a SoHo development with Russian associates, the 2013 Miss Universe pageant in Moscow, transactions with the Bank of Cyprus, real estate financing organized by Kushner, and Trump's sale of a Florida mansion for $30 million over its appraised value to Russian oligarch Dmitry Rybolovlev. The special counsel team has contacted Deutsche Bank, which is the main banking institution doing business with The Trump Organization. The Wall Street Journal reported on December 6, 2017, that Deutsche Bank received a subpoena from Mueller's office earlier that fall concerning people or entities affiliated with President Trump. The original Journal story incorrectly reported that Trump's records had been subpoenaed, which The New York Times reported on April 10, 2018 prompted Trump to tell his advisers "in no uncertain terms" that the Mueller investigation must be shut down, before Mueller's office advised his attorneys the report was inaccurate.

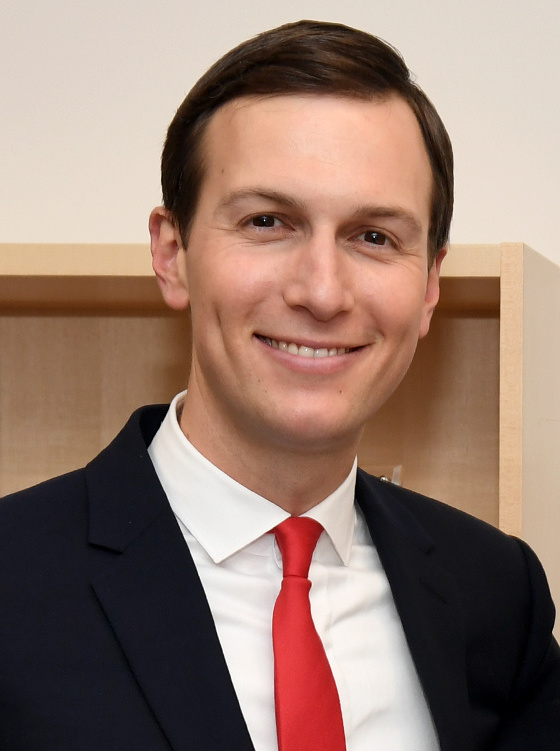
Jared Kushner, former CEO of Kushner Properties and senior advisor to President Trump

Kushner Properties—from which Jared Kushner resigned as CEO in early 2017 to serve as a senior advisor in the Trump White House—purchased the office tower located at 666 Fifth Avenue in Manhattan in 2007, just before Manhattan real estate prices fell in the Great Recession. The property has since experienced financial difficulties that the company has been attempting to resolve with new financing, without success, before the property's $1.2 billion mortgage comes due in February 2019. This effort has reportedly been complicated by Trump's election, which has caused potential lenders to avoid appearances of conflicts of interest. The matter has raised the interest of investigators who are looking at Kushner's December 2016 meeting with Sergei Gorkov, who said in a statement issued by his bank that he met with Kushner in his capacity as the then-chief executive of Kushner Properties, while Kushner assured Congress in a July 24, 2017, statement that the meeting did not involve "any discussion about my companies, business transactions, real estate projects, loans, banking arrangements or any private business of any kind". CNN reported on February 20, 2018, that Mueller's investigation has expanded beyond Kushner's contacts with Russia and now includes his efforts to secure financing for Kushner Properties from other foreign investors during the presidential transition. Kushner Properties sold the 666 Fifth Avenue building in summer 2018.

Mueller took over an existing money laundering investigation into former Trump campaign chairman Manafort. On October 30, 2017, a federal grand jury indicted Manafort and his associate Rick Gates on charges including conspiracy against the United States, conspiracy to launder money, failure to file reports of foreign bank and financial accounts, being an unregistered agent of foreign principal, false and misleading FARA statements, and false statements. Manafort's financial activities are also being investigated by the Senate and House intelligence committees, the New York Attorney General, and the Manhattan District Attorney.

The Special Counsel will be able to access Trump's tax returns, which has "especially disturbed" Trump according to The Washington Post. Trump's refusal to release his tax returns, as presidential candidates normally do, has been politically controversial since his presidential campaign.

The Special Counsel is also investigating whether the Central Bank of Russia's deputy governor, Aleksandr Torshin, illegally funneled money through the National Rifle Association of America (NRA) to benefit Trump's campaign. On May 16, 2018, the Senate Judiciary Committee released a report stating it had obtained "a number of documents that suggest the Kremlin used the NRA as a means of accessing and assisting Mr. Trump and his campaign" through Torshin and his assistant Mariia Butina, and that "The Kremlin may also have used the NRA to secretly fund Mr. Trump's campaign." The NRA reported spending $30 million to support the Trump campaign—triple what they devoted to backing Republican Mitt Romney in the 2012 presidential race. Most of that money was spent by an arm of the NRA that is not required to disclose its donors. Torshin, a lifetime NRA member, reportedly sought to broker a meeting between Trump and Vladimir Putin in May 2016, but was rebuffed by Kushner. Torshin claims to have met with Trump at a Nashville NRA event in April 2015; he tweeted about the encounter in August, saying that Trump is "a proponent of traditional family values". Torshin spoke with Donald Trump Jr. during a gala event at the NRA's national gathering in Kentucky in May 2016, which Trump Jr.'s attorney Alan Futerfas characterized as "all gun-related small talk". Spanish authorities have implicated Torshin in money laundering and have described him as a "godfather" in Taganskaya, a major Russian criminal organization. On July 14, 2018, Butina was charged by the national security unit of the Justice Department with being an unregistered Russian agent who had attempted to create a backchannel of communications between American Republicans/conservatives and Russian officials by infiltrating the NRA, the National Prayer Breakfast and conservative religious organizations. On December 13, 2018, she pleaded guilty to conspiring with Torshin in this effort. The New York Times reported on July 17, 2018, that Torshin was scheduled to visit the White House in 2017, but the meeting was canceled after a national security aide noted Torshin was under investigation by Spanish authorities for money laundering.

CNN reported on April 4, 2018, that Mueller's investigators have been examining whether Russian oligarchs directly or indirectly provided illegal cash donations to the Trump campaign and inauguration. Investigators were examining whether oligarchs invested in American companies or think tanks having political action committees connected to the campaign, as well as money funneled through American straw donors to the Trump campaign and inaugural fund. At least one oligarch was detained and his electronic devices searched as he arrived at a New York area airport on his private jet in early 2018; subsequent reporting by The New York Times identified the man as Viktor Vekselberg. Vekselberg was questioned about hundreds of thousands of dollars in payments made to Michael Cohen after the election, through Columbus Nova, the American affiliate of Vekselberg's Renova Group. Another oligarch was also detained on a recent trip to the United States, but it is unclear if he was searched. Investigators reportedly have also asked a third oligarch who has not traveled to the United States to voluntarily provide documents and an interview.

The New York Times reported on April 9, 2018, that the Mueller investigation is examining a $150,000 donation Victor Pinchuk, a Ukrainian billionaire, made in September 2015 to the Donald J. Trump Foundation in exchange for a 20-minute appearance Trump made via video link to a conference in Kyiv. This transaction came to light in documents the Trump Organization provided to investigators pursuant to a subpoena earlier in 2018. The donation, the largest the Foundation received in 2015 other than from Trump himself, was solicited by his attorney, Michael Cohen. The Times reported that the subpoena had demanded "documents, emails and other communications about several Russians, including some whose names have not been publicly tied to Mr. Trump".

Documents acquired by The New York Times in March 2019 showed that search warrants for Michael Cohen's emails were obtained by Mueller investigators in July 2017, with one warrant referencing a scheme "to make an illegal campaign contribution in October 2016 to then-presidential candidate Donald Trump". Nineteen pages of the documents relating to an "illegal campaign contribution scheme" were fully redacted.

=== Cohen raids ===
On April 9, 2018, based on a referral to United States District Court for the Southern District of New York (SDNY) from the special counsel, the FBI raided the New York City office, residence, hotel suite, and safe-deposit boxes of Michael Cohen, seizing records related to several topics. The FBI seized Cohen's computers, phones, and personal financial records, including tax returns, as part of the no-knock raid on his office in 30 Rockefeller Plaza. CNN cited unnamed sources saying the search warrant was "very broad in terms of items sought" and that it included bank records.

The warrant was personally approved by Deputy Attorney General Rod Rosenstein and carried out by the public corruption unit of the SDNY. Geoffrey Berman, the interim head of the SDNY, was recused from the matter; a Trump appointee, he had worked as a volunteer attorney on the Trump campaign. Further, due to the sensitive nature of the raid and the attorney–client privilege, a special "taint" team is required to review the documents to carefully separate out privileged and protected documents that may have been seized in the raid to ensure those inadmissible documents are not passed on to investigators. Legal blogger and former federal prosecutor Ken White of Popehat published a New York Times op-ed giving some background on the DOJ procedures required to approve such a raid, saying the search "suggests that the prosecutors believe they can convince a judge that communications between Mr. Trump and Mr. Cohen fall under the crime-fraud exception" of attorney-client privilege. It called the raid "highly dangerous" for both Cohen and Trump. White posted further analysis on Popehat, citing section 9-13.320 [sic] [recte 9-13.420] of the United States Attorneys' Manual, which sets the guidelines and regulations for searches of attorney premises.

== Lobbyists ==
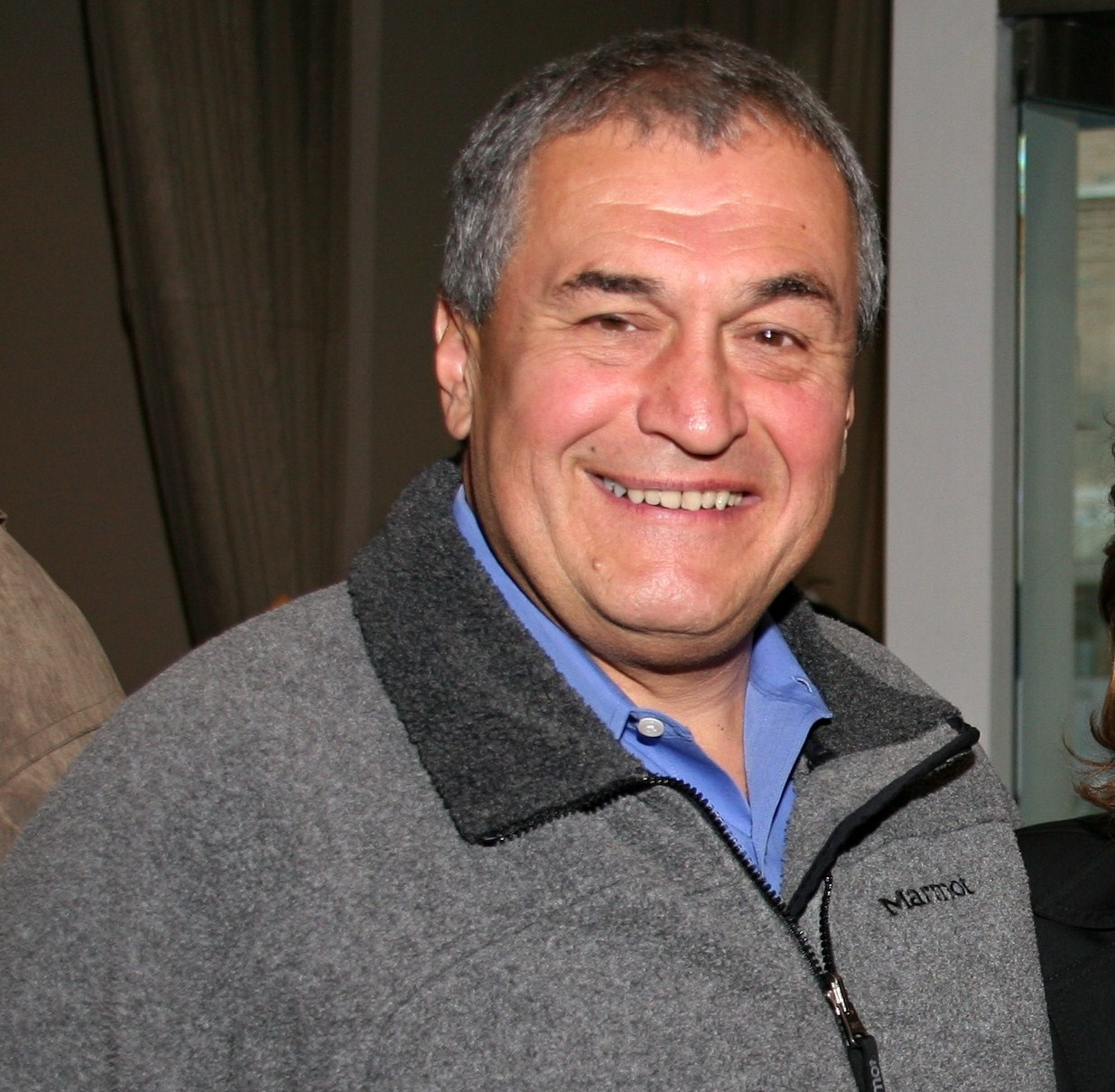
Tony Podesta, co-founder of the now-defunct Podesta Group

In August 2017, Mueller's team issued grand jury subpoenas to officials in six firms, including lobbying firm Podesta Group and Mercury LLC with regard to activities on behalf of a public-relations campaign for a pro-Russian Ukrainian organization called European Centre for a Modern Ukraine. The public relations effort was headed by Paul Manafort, and took place from 2012 to 2014. The Podesta Group is run by Tony Podesta, and Mercury LLC is headed by Vin Weber, a former GOP congressman. Mueller is investigating whether the firms violated the Foreign Agents Registration Act (FARA). The Podesta Group announced in November 2017 that it would be permanently closing, with many of its employees moving to Cogent Strategies, a new firm founded by Podesta Group CEO Kimberley Fritts. Mueller's office later referred the matter to other federal investigators, who closed it in September 2019 without charges against Podesta or Weber.

== Trump as a subject of investigation ==
From the beginning of his presidency Trump had requested assurances that he was not personally under investigation. FBI Director Comey told him so privately on three occasions but refused to make a public comment to that effect. In his letter dismissing Comey, Trump thanked Comey for "informing me, on three separate occasions, that I am not under investigation". Comey later confirmed that this was true.

In March 2018, Mueller's office reportedly informed Trump's attorneys that the president is not a "criminal target" but remains a "subject" of the continuing investigation. Trump's advisers were reported to be split in their interpretation of this, with some believing it was an indication that his legal exposure was low, while others expressed concern that Mueller was inducing him to agree to a personal interview, which his attorneys have discouraged him from doing for fear he might perjure himself and thus change his status from subject to target. The Post reported that Mueller also advised the attorneys that he is "preparing a report about the president's actions while in office and potential obstruction of justice". The Post referenced Justice Department guidelines, which explain:

A "target" is a person as to whom the prosecutor or the grand jury has substantial evidence linking him or her to the commission of a crime and who, in the judgment of the prosecutor, is a putative defendant. A "subject" of an investigation is a person whose conduct is within the scope of the grand jury's investigation.

Trump told reporters on January 24, 2018, that he was "looking forward" to testifying under oath to the Mueller investigation, perhaps in "two or three weeks", but added that it was "subject to my lawyers and all of that". The Wall Street Journal reported on February 25, 2018, that Trump's lawyers are considering ways for him to testify, provided the questions he faces are limited in scope and do not test his recollections in ways that amount to a potential perjury trap. Among options they are considering are providing written answers to Mueller's questions and having the president give limited face-to-face testimony. The Washington Post reported on March 19, 2018, that Trump's attorneys provided Mueller's office "written descriptions that chronicle key moments under investigation in hopes of curtailing the scope of a presidential interview." In May 2018, Trump's lawyer Rudy Giuliani told Politico that Mueller's team has rejected the proposal of providing a written testimony instead of an oral interview. Trump ultimately was not personally interviewed by the special counsel. In November 2018 he said he was preparing written answers to a set of questions, and in late November his legal team said he had submitted answers to the counsel's written questions about "issues regarding the Russia-related topics of the inquiry."

== Other topics ==
The Intercept reported on March 2, 2018, that Jared Kushner and his father Charles Kushner made a proposal to Qatar's finance minister, Ali Sharif Al Emadi, in April 2017 to secure investment into 666 5th Avenue asset in his family's company's portfolio, when his request was not fulfilled, a group of Middle Eastern countries, with Jared Kushner's backing, initiated a diplomatic assault that culminated in a blockade of Qatar. Kushner specifically undermined the efforts by Secretary of State Rex Tillerson to bring an end to the standoff.

The New York Times reported on March 3, 2018, that the Mueller investigation had been examining possible efforts by the United Arab Emirates (UAE) to buy political influence by directing money to the Trump campaign. Investigators had recently interviewed Lebanese-American businessman George Nader, and other witnesses, about this matter. Nader was reportedly a frequent White House visitor during 2017 and investigators have inquired about any policymaking role he may have had. Investigators have examined a meeting around January 11, 2017, in the Seychelles that was convened by the UAE Crown Prince Mohammed bin Zayed Al Nahyan (known as "MBZ"), which Nader attended. Also present at that meeting were Kirill Dmitriev, the CEO of state-owned Russian Direct Investment Fund, who is close to Vladimir Putin; and Blackwater founder Erik Prince, a major Trump donor and an informal advisor to the Trump transition. UAE officials reportedly believed that Prince was representing the Trump transition and Dmitriev was representing Putin. The Mueller report later found that Nader had represented Prince to Dmitriev as "designated by Steve [Bannon] to meet you! I know him and he is very very well connected and trusted by the New Team," while Prince "acknowledged that it was fair for Nader to think that Prince would pass information on to the Transition Team," although Bannon told investigators that Prince had not informed him of the Dmitriev meeting in advance. Prince testified to the House Intelligence Committee that "I didn't fly there to meet any Russian guy," although the Mueller report found that he and Nader made significant preparations to meet Dmitriev. Although Prince characterized a second meeting between him and Dmitriev in a hotel bar as a chance encounter of no consequence, the meeting was actually pre-arranged after Prince had learned from calls back home that Russia had moved an aircraft carrier off Libya and he wanted to convey that the United States would not accept any Russian involvement in Libya.

An aircraft owned by Andrei Skoch—a Russian billionaire subject to U.S. sanctions—arrived in the Seychelles a day before Prince himself did. The Washington Post had reported on April 3, 2017, that American, European and Arab officials said the Seychelles meeting was "part of an apparent effort to establish a back-channel line of communication between Moscow and President-elect Donald Trump". Prince denied in November 30, 2017, House Intelligence Committee testimony that he had represented the Trump transition or that the meeting involved any back-channel. The Washington Post reported on March 7, 2018, that Mueller has gathered evidence that contradicts Prince, and ABC News reported on April 6, 2018, that Nader had met with Prince at a Manhattan hotel days before the Seychelles meeting and later provided him with biographical information about Dmitriev. CNN reported on March 6, 2018, that Nader had been detained and questioned by the FBI at Dulles International Airport as he returned from a trip abroad on January 17, 2018.

Agents with search warrants copied the contents of Nader's electronic devices and served him with a subpoena to appear before a grand jury on January 19. CNN also reported that Nader had attended a December 2016 meeting in New York attended by MBZ; UAE ambassador to the US Yousef Al Otaiba; and at least three Trump senior associates: Michael Flynn, Steve Bannon, and Jared Kushner. The Wall Street Journal reported on April 2, 2018, that Mueller's investigators have inquired about the work done by a private consulting company, Wikistrat, on behalf of the UAE. One of the firm's co-founders, Joel Zamel, has reportedly been asked about his work with certain clients and his business relationship with George Nader. The Journal reported that, like Nader, Zamel had tried to forge a relationship with the new Trump administration.

The New York Times reported on April 4, 2018, that Nader has a history of dealings with Russia dating back to at least 2012, when he brokered a $4.2 billion arms deal between Russia and Iraq, and attended an invitation-only conference in Moscow organized by close associates of Vladimir Putin. Nader has reportedly traveled frequently to Russia on behalf of the UAE, accompanying MBZ on many of those trips, and has had his photo taken with Putin. Nader has reportedly received at least partial immunity for his cooperation with the Mueller investigation. The Times also reported that Joel Zamel had been stopped at Reagan International Airport in February 2018, had his electronic devices briefly seized, and later testified before the Mueller grand jury about his relationship with Nader. The New York Times reported on May 19, 2018, that Trump Jr. met with Nader, Prince and Zamel in Trump Tower on August 3, 2016. Nader reportedly told Trump Jr. the crown princes of Saudi Arabia and the UAE were eager to help his father win the election. According to Trump Jr.'s attorney Alan Futerfas, Zamel pitched a social media manipulation campaign from his Israeli company Psy-Group, although Zamel's attorney Marc Saroff Mukasey denied this. Trump Jr. reportedly responded favorably according to one source, although Futerfas denied this. Nader subsequently had frequent meetings with Steve Bannon, Michael Flynn and Jared Kushner. After Trump's election, Nader paid Zamel a large sum of money of up to $2 million. The Times reported that Prince had arranged the August 2016 meeting; Prince had stated in his November 30, 2017, testimony to the House Intelligence Committee that he had no formal communications or contact, nor any unofficial role, with the Trump campaign. The Times reported on October 8, 2018, that sometime after March 2016 Rick Gates had solicited Psy-Group to present proposals for social media manipulation and opposition research against Trump's primary opponents and Hillary Clinton. Gates reportedly was uninterested in the Psy-Group proposals, as social media strategy was being developed inside the Trump campaign, and there is no evidence the Trump campaign pursued the Psy-Group proposals. The Mueller investigation obtained copies of the proposals and questioned Psy-Group employees.

Axios reported on March 4, 2018, that it had seen a grand jury subpoena that Mueller's office sent to a witness in February 2018. Axios did not name the witness. The subpoena reportedly demands all communications, from November 1, 2015, to date, that the witness sent or received "regarding" Trump; Carter Page; Corey Lewandowski; Hope Hicks; Keith Schiller; Michael Cohen; Paul Manafort; Rick Gates; Roger Stone; and Steve Bannon. A subsequent report by NBC News stated that the subpoena also encompasses "work papers, telephone logs, and other documents". On March 5, 2018, the witness was identified as Sam Nunberg, who served as a communications consultant on the Trump campaign until August 2, 2015, and later as an informal adviser. Nunberg stated that he had been subpoenaed to appear before a federal grand jury on March 9, 2018, but he would refuse to appear or provide any of the subpoenaed documents. After multiple defiant television appearances on March 5, 2018, Nunberg indicated the next day that he planned to comply with the subpoena.

The New Yorker reported on March 5, 2018, that Christopher Steele spoke with Mueller's investigators in September 2017. The magazine asserted that Steele discussed another document he had authored in November 2016—after the Steele dossier—that describes discussions "a senior Russian official" had heard inside the Russian Ministry of Foreign Affairs: that the Kremlin had asked Trump "through unspecified channels" to not appoint Mitt Romney as Secretary of State. As a presidential candidate in 2012, Romney described Russia as "our number one geopolitical foe". After publicly considering Romney as Secretary of State, Trump ultimately selected Rex Tillerson, who has a long history of business dealings in Russia and was awarded the Order of Friendship by Vladimir Putin in 2013.

Senate Finance Committee report on Michael Cohen's financial crimes and dealings with Novartis

The Washington Post reported on March 6, 2018, that Mueller's office had requested documents and interviewed witnesses regarding activities of Michael Cohen, Trump's longtime personal lawyer. Investigators are reported to be interested in at least two episodes relating to Russian interests, including the proposed construction of Trump Tower Moscow and "a Russia-friendly peace proposal for Ukraine that was delivered to Cohen by a Ukrainian lawmaker one week after Trump took office". The New York Times reported, on January 10, 2019, that Mueller investigators, and other federal prosecutors, were investigating the activities of over a dozen Russia-aligned Ukrainian political and business figures who attended the Trump inauguration, ostensibly promoting a pro-Russian "peace plan" for Ukraine that included the lifting of sanctions against Russia. Andrey Artemenko, a Ukrainian politician who attended the Trump inaugural, was interviewed by the FBI and the Mueller grand jury, having met, days after the inaugural, with Trump attorney Michael Cohen and former Trump business associate Felix Sater, in New York, to present a proposal. Cohen hand-delivered Artemenko's proposal to Michael Flynn one week before Flynn resigned as national security advisor.

The New York Times reported on March 7, 2018, that the Mueller investigation is aware of conversations Trump had with two witnesses regarding their testimony with investigators. In one conversation, Trump asked White House counsel Don McGahn to issue a statement denying a story The Times published in January 2018. That story reported that McGahn told investigators Trump had ordered him to direct the Justice Department to dismiss Mueller. McGahn never issued the statement and reportedly told Trump that the president had, in fact, told him to have Mueller dismissed. The New York Times reported on August 18, 2018, that McGahn had been cooperating extensively with the Mueller investigation for several months and that he and his lawyer had become concerned that Trump "had decided to let Mr. McGahn take the fall for decisions that could be construed as obstruction of justice, like the Comey firing, by telling the special counsel that he was only following shoddy legal advice from Mr. McGahn". Trump also asked his former chief of staff Reince Priebus how his interview with investigators had gone and whether they were "nice". The Times reported that although "legal experts" thought the conversations probably did not constitute witness tampering, witnesses and attorneys who became aware of the conversations reported them to Mueller.

The New York Times reported on March 15, 2018, that the Mueller investigation had subpoenaed documents from The Trump Organization, including all documents related to Russia. Although the full scope of the subpoena was not clear, it was the first known time investigators demanded documents from Trump's businesses. The Los Angeles Times reported the same day that the special counsel's office had also subpoenaed the Trump campaign for documents.

The Daily Beast reported on March 22, 2018, that Mueller had taken over the probe into Guccifer 2.0 from the FBI.

NBC News reported on March 30, 2018, that Ted Malloch, a London-based American professor and author who worked with the Trump campaign, had been detained and questioned by the FBI two days earlier as he arrived at Boston Logan Airport after a flight from London. He was served with a subpoena to appear for questioning by Mueller's investigators on April 13, and presented with a warrant to have his phone seized and searched. Malloch told NBC in an email that FBI agents asked him a variety of questions, including about Roger Stone, author Jerome Corsi, and WikiLeaks. CNN reported that Malloch has written a forthcoming book alleging a "deep state" within the United States government fabricated the Steele dossier to destroy Trump. Corsi was subpoenaed for questioning by Mueller's investigators in September 2018, and by November he was facing perjury charges. That month, a draft court filing showed Corsi and Stone had exchanged emails in summer 2016 indicating their knowledge of impending email "dumps" by Wikileaks. In one email, Stone directed Corsi to contact Assange, which Corsi told investigators he had ignored, although investigators found he had passed the directive to an associate in London, whom Corsi later identified as Malloch.

Michael R. Caputo, a former communications adviser for the Trump campaign, was interviewed by Mueller's investigators on May 2, 2018. Caputo was recruited to the Trump campaign by Paul Manafort and had previously worked with Russian politicians. A long-time associate of Roger Stone, Caputo stated after his interview, "It's clear they are still really focused on Russia collusion. They know more about the Trump campaign than anyone who ever worked there."

CNN reported on May 5, 2018, that Mueller's investigators had interviewed Trump's close friend and inaugural committee chairman Tom Barrack in December 2017, asking him primarily about his relationship with Manafort and Gates, although The Associated Press reported the interview was broader and included campaign finance matters.

On May 9, 2018, CNBC reported that Mueller's office had contacted telecommunications giant AT&T regarding payments totalling at least $200,000, but possibly as high as $600,000, made to a company founded by Michael Cohen in order to gain "insights" into the incoming Trump administration. An AT&T spokesperson said that they had provided all the information requested by the Special Counsel in November and December 2017.

Glenn R. Simpson, a co-founder of Fusion GPS, testified to the Senate Judiciary Committee on August 22, 2017, that the FBI told Christopher Steele—and then Steele told Simpson—that the FBI had "a human source from inside the Trump organization" (and, more specifically, "an internal Trump campaign source"). Simpson did not indicate when Steele received this information or when he conveyed it to Simpson. The Washington Post reported on May 8, 2018, that a longtime FBI and CIA informant had provided information about connections between Russia and the Trump campaign to FBI investigators early in their investigation. This sparked speculation that the FBI had planted a "mole" inside the Trump campaign, although it was not clear that the individual Simpson described was the same individual described by The Post. The Washington Post reported on May 9, 2018, that House Intelligence Committee Chairman Devin Nunes subpoenaed the Justice Department to provide him with all documents regarding the longtime informant; The Post quoted the subpoena as demanding "all documents referring or related to the individual referenced in Chairman Nunes' April 24, 2018, classified letter to Attorney General Sessions", although Nunes denied he had referred to any specific individual. The Justice Department resisted on the grounds that revealing the information could endanger the life of a longtime top-secret informant for the FBI and CIA, and the Trump White House—with the president's agreement—sided with the Justice Department. The New York Times reported on May 16, 2018, that at least one government informant had met several times with Trump campaign aides Carter Page and George Papadopoulos.

The Washington Post noted on January 9, 2018, that the source Simpson had referred to may not necessarily have been an informant willingly or directly, or during the campaign, but rather may have become an informant as a result of later becoming implicated in wrongdoing. Natasha Bertrand, then with Business Insider, reported on January 3, 2018, that a source told her Simpson had been referring to George Papadopoulos, who had first been interviewed by the FBI seven days after Trump's inauguration and whose cooperation with the FBI—to "provide information regarding any and all matters as to which the Government deems relevant"—began with his arrest on July 27, 2017, and was not publicly known until his indictment in October 2017. The New York Times reported on May 18, 2018, that the FBI sent an informant to meet with George Papadopoulos in late-summer 2016, and to meet repeatedly with Carter Page over ensuing months, after the FBI had acquired evidence that the two men had suspicious contacts with Russians. The Washington Post reported the same day that the informant first approached Page at a symposium in Britain in July 2016, and in September 2016 invited Papadopoulos to London to work on a research paper. Late that summer, the informant also met with Trump campaign co-chairman Sam Clovis in Northern Virginia. The informant was identified as an American academic who teaches in Britain, but both The Times and The Post declined to publish his name. NBC News identified him as Stefan Halper.

The Washington Post reported on June 28, 2018, that the Mueller investigation, as well as British investigators, were examining relationships between the Brexit movement, Russia and the Trump campaign. The Post reported that Mueller's investigators had specifically asked two individuals, including former Trump communications official Michael Caputo, about relationships between Trump associates and Brexit leader Nigel Farage. Ted Malloch, who had worked with the Trump campaign and was later questioned by Mueller investigators, was reportedly close to Farage.

ABC News reported on September 20, 2018, that Michael Cohen had been interviewed by Mueller's investigators multiple times since he pleaded guilty to charges a month earlier. The interviews covered a broad range of topics, including Trump's business dealings with Russians, alleged collusion between Russians and the Trump campaign and whether Trump or his associates had discussed a pardon of Cohen with him.

In August 2018, a sealed court case was brought before Beryl Howell, the chief judge of the DC District Court, who oversees grand jury proceedings. The case bounced back and forth between Howell and the DC Circuit Court of Appeals over several weeks, as press speculation grew that the secret case was related to a witness challenging a Mueller subpoena. CNN reporters observed Mueller attorneys entering Howell's courtroom in September. CNN later confirmed that the case did involve a Mueller subpoena that was being challenged. The case was heard by a three-judge panel of the Circuit court on December 14, amid such secrecy that the entire fifth floor of the court building was cleared so reporters could not observe the proceedings or participants. Four days later, the judges ruled that the plaintiff, an unnamed foreign company, must comply with the subpoena. The company appealed the ruling to the Supreme Court on December 22, although the Court is not known to hear cases that are completely sealed. The Court denied the appeal on January 8, 2019.

Thomas Barrack was arrested on 20 July 2021 on charges of illegally lobbying for the UAE government without registering himself as a lobbyist with the US State Department under the Foreign Agents Registration Act. Tom, Donald Trump's former outside adviser and one of his 2016 campaign's top fundraisers, was arrested on a nine-count indictment for not registering as an agent for lobbying for the UAE government and obstruction of justice by lying to the investigators about it. However, on 23 July 2021, Barrack posted bail worth $250 million followed by a security of $5 million in cash and claimed he will be proved innocent. The case stemmed from Mueller probe, but was prosecuted by US attorney's office in Brooklyn. In November 2022, Barrack was found not guilty on all charges.

The Justice Department disclosed in August 2021 that the investigation scrutinized an unnamed "member of the news media suspected of participating in the conspiracy" to hack and release Democratic emails. In 2018, Rosenstein authorized subpoenas for the individual's phone and email records and testimony before a grand jury, though it was not clear if the individual was actually called to testify. The Justice Department did not clarify whether the individual was a traditional journalist or a commentator on current events.

== Facebook–Cambridge Analytica data scandal ==
The Wall Street Journal reported on December 15, 2017, that Mueller's office had requested and received employee emails from Cambridge Analytica, a data analytics firm that worked for the Trump campaign, earlier that year. The Associated Press reported on March 22, 2018, that the special counsel was examining the connections between the company, the Trump campaign and the Republican National Committee, particularly how voter data may have been used in battleground states. Ultimately, however, the final Mueller Report made no findings regarding Cambridge Analytica, and the name does not appear in the two volumes of the report.

Several news agencies reported on April 4, 2018, that the security of 87 million Facebook users' private data had been shared, without their consent, via Cambridge Analytica, influencing voters and helping Trump win the 2016 election. The New York Times reported on May 15, 2018, that the Justice Department and FBI were investigating Cambridge Analytica, although it was unclear if Mueller's office was involved in the investigation.

== See also ==
- Nobody Is Above the Law, a nationwide protest held on November 8, 2018
- Special Counsel Independence and Integrity Act, a proposed law that sought to protect the investigation
- Russian espionage in the United States
- Russia involvement in regime change
- RT America, the American arm of the RT network
- Russian interference in the 2016 United States elections
