= Alan Futerfas =

American criminal defense attorney (born 1961)

- Born: 1961 (age 64–65); Miami, Florida, U.S.
- Education: Juilliard School (BM); Yeshiva University (JD)

Alan Futerfas (born 1961) is an American criminal defense attorney. He has represented several notable clients, including figures such as Donald Trump Jr., son of Donald Trump.

== Early life and education ==
Futerfas was born in Miami. He is of Jewish descent. He graduated from Miami Coral Park Senior High School in 1979 and the Juilliard School in 1984 (Bachelor of Music), and his J.D. degree from Yeshiva University Cardozo School of Law in 1987. In the summer of 1985, while in law school, he worked for lawyer Jay Goldberg.

Futerfas plays bass trombone in the Park Avenue Chamber Symphony.

== Career as a criminal defense attorney ==
Futerfas has represented clients in a number of high-profile organized crime cases, including New York Mafia clients connected to the Colombo, Gambino, and Genovese families. He represented Mafia hitman Gregory Scarpa. In the late 1990s, he transitioned to largely handling white-collar cases, U.S. Securities and Exchange Commission (SEC) investigations and other regulatory matters. In the early 2000s, Futerfas represented Christine Berry, art consultant to ex-Tyco International CEO L. Dennis Kozlowski, in connection with an investigation that led to a larger case against Kozlowski.

Futerfas was also the attorney for Ziv Orenstein, one of three Israeli citizens indicted in 2015 on charges of being part of a cybertheft ring that stole customer data from JPMorgan Chase and Dow Jones & Co. the previous year as part of a huge "pump and dump" scheme. In a separate cybercrime case, Futerfas represented Nikita Kuzmin, a Russian national who created malware targeting bank accounts.

Futerfas' firm has represented a Rikers Island female prisoner in a 2015 rights and sexual assault case.

== See also ==
- Timeline of Russian interference in the 2016 United States elections
