= Jay Goldberg =

American lawyer (1933–2022)

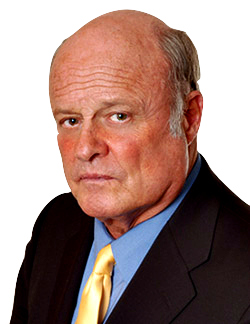

Personal details
- Born: January 2, 1933 New York City, New York, U.S.
- Died: December 5, 2022 (aged 89) New York City, New York, U.S.
- Education: Brooklyn College (BA); Harvard University (LLB)

Jay Goldberg (January 2, 1933 – December 5, 2022) was an American lawyer and author based in New York City. A magna cum laude graduate of Harvard Law School, he was best known for his representation of high-profile clients and cases, including President Donald Trump throughout his divorces and several real estate transactions. Goldberg began his career in New York working for District Attorney Frank Hogan and was appointed acting United States Attorney for the Northwestern District of Indiana, by appointment of then Attorney General Robert F. Kennedy.

Goldberg represented Bono, Mick Jagger, Waylon Jennings, Willie Nelson, Miles Davis, The Rolling Stones, Sean Combs, Johnny Cash, Lynyrd Skynyrd, industrialist Dr. Armand Hammer, investor Carl Icahn, Congressman Charlie Rangel, Bess Meyerson, the Hells Angels, Howard Stern Wack Packer Elegant Elliot Offen, and key figures associated with the American Mafia including Matty "The Horse" Ianniello, Joe "Scarface" Agone, Vincent "Jimmy Blue Eyes" Alo, and Frank Tieri.

== Early life ==
Goldberg was born January 2, 1933, in Brooklyn, New York, United States. As a youth, he took a keen interest in sports, including baseball, football and basketball, but a passion for competitive boxing soon eclipsed an interest in other sports. He spent considerable time at the legendary boxing gym owned by Lou Stillman where he began a long-term relationship with Rocky Graziano, a relationship he maintained until Graziano died in 1990.

Goldberg attended Brooklyn College, graduating magna cum laude and was elected as early as his junior year to Phi Beta Kappa. After college he considered a career in the law, influenced by his many visits to the federal and state courts in Manhattan and Brooklyn. He graduated from Harvard Law School magna cum laude. During law school he met Regina "Rema" Goldberg at a Concord Resort Hotel mixer "single weekend." Rema and he were married at Tavern on the Green in Central Park. She serves as a jury consultant to attorneys.

== Published works ==
Goldberg was the author of four books: Preparation and Trial of Criminal Cases Within the Second Circuit (2009) Techniques in the Defense of a Federal Criminal Case, (2012), Preparation, and Trial of A Federal Criminal Case (2010), and The Courtroom Is My Theatre, a personal account of his storied legal career.

== Death ==
Goldberg died at his home in Bridgehampton, on December 5, 2022. He was 89.
