= Tony Podesta =

American lobbyist (born 1943)

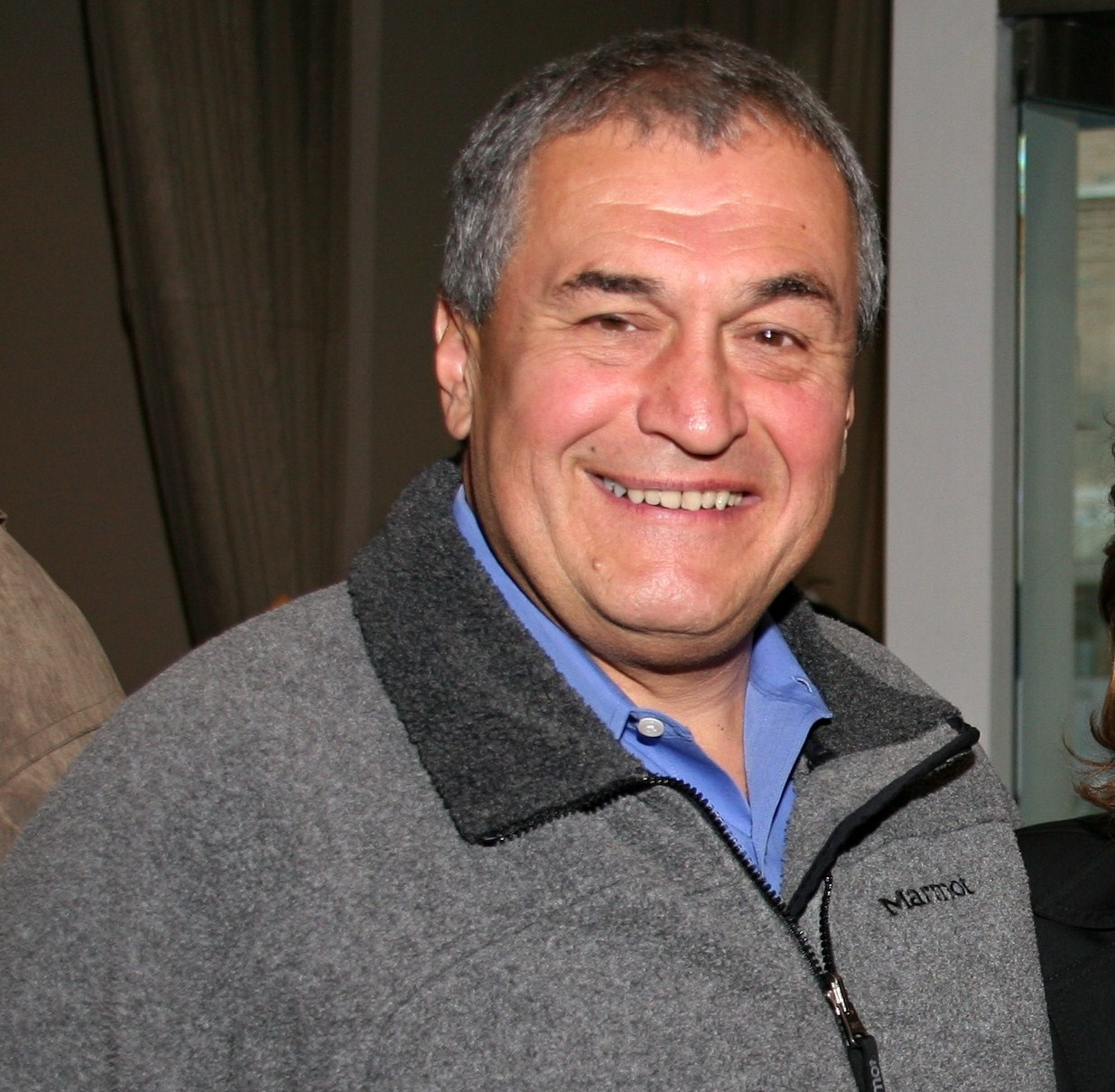
- Podesta in 2009
- Born: Anthony Thomas Podesta; October 24, 1943 (age 83); Chicago, Illinois, U.S.
- Education: University of Illinois Chicago (BA); Massachusetts Institute of Technology (MA); Georgetown University (JD)
- Occupation: Lobbyist
- Known for: Co-founded the Podesta Group
- Spouse: Heather Podesta (m. 2003; div. 2014)
- Relatives: John Podesta (brother)
- Website: www.podesta.com

Anthony Thomas Podesta (born October 24, 1943) is an American lobbyist best known for founding the Podesta Group. The brother of former White House Chief of Staff John Podesta, he was formerly one of Washington D.C.'s most powerful lobbyists and fundraisers.

Podesta and the Podesta Group were under federal investigation regarding compliance with the Foreign Agents Registration Act for their work for a Ukrainian group tied to the former Ukrainian President Viktor Yanukovych beginning in 2012. The investigation was closed in September 2019 without charges being brought. In 2021, Podesta was reportedly hired by Huawei as a lobbyist and consultant.

== Life and career ==
Podesta was born in Chicago, where he was raised, with his Greek-American mother Mary, first-generation Italian American immigrant father John Sr., and his brother John Podesta Jr. His father was a factory worker. He studied political science both in college, at the University of Illinois at Chicago (UIC), and in graduate school at MIT. He received his J.D. degree from Georgetown University.

As Student Congress President, Podesta spoke at the opening ceremony of the University of Illinois at Chicago Circle campus (now UIC) on February 22, 1965.

He was married to congressional staffer and lobbyist Heather Miller Podesta from 2003 to 2014.

=== Early campaigns ===
While studying at MIT in 1968, Podesta left school to work on the presidential campaign of Senator Eugene McCarthy, for whom he did field work and ran the scheduling advance operation in California and other states. After McCarthy lost the Democratic nomination to Hubert Humphrey, Podesta organized students on behalf of the Humphrey-Muskie campaign.

McCarthy was the first of several losing Democratic politicians that Podesta campaigned for. Others included Joe Duffey for the U.S. Senate in Connecticut in 1970, Ed Muskie and then George McGovern for president in 1972, Ted Kennedy in 1980, Walter Mondale's presidential campaign in 1984, and Michael Dukakis in 1988, the same year the Podesta brothers founded their lobbying firm.

=== Career in lobbying and activism ===
In 1981, Tony Podesta became a founding president of People for the American Way, a secular liberal group started by television producer Norman Lear. He led the group until 1987.

Podesta's lobbying firm, the Podesta Group, had more than $40 million in annual revenue at its peak at the time of the Obama administration.

In 1988 Tony and John Podesta founded Podesta Associates, which became PodestaMattoon when Republican Daniel Mattoon joined the team in 2001. The name was again changed to the Podesta Group when Mattoon left in 2006.

By 2015, the Podesta Group was the third largest in Washington, D.C., with revenue of approximately $30 million. Clients of the firm have included Google, Wells Fargo, General Electric, Boeing and the Washington trade group for the U.S. drug industry. The firm had a number of foreign governments as clients, including the Kingdom of Saudi Arabia, the Republic of Iraq and the government of South Sudan. According to The Wall Street Journal, Podesta's lobbying firm performed well in 2015, because clients believed that he had access to a future Hillary Clinton administration. In the 2016 presidential election, he raised money for Clinton. Fundraising records show that over the course of a decade Podesta and his wife Heather donated more to the Democratic Party and its candidates than any other lobbyists.

Podesta has lobbied for a variety of groups, including Bank of America, BP, and Egypt. More recently, he has worked for Pennsylvania Democratic representatives Joe Sestak, Chris Carney, and Patrick Murphy, and chaired former Pennsylvania Gov. Ed Rendell's reelection campaign. In 2016, Podesta was on the board of a Vietnamese casino company run by an American businessman who had been barred from the securities industry in United States for defrauding customers. The casino company sought to get the Vietnamese government to deregulate the gambling sector.

In 2019 he presented "The Gifts of Tony Podesta' at the Katzen Arts Center in Washington D.C.

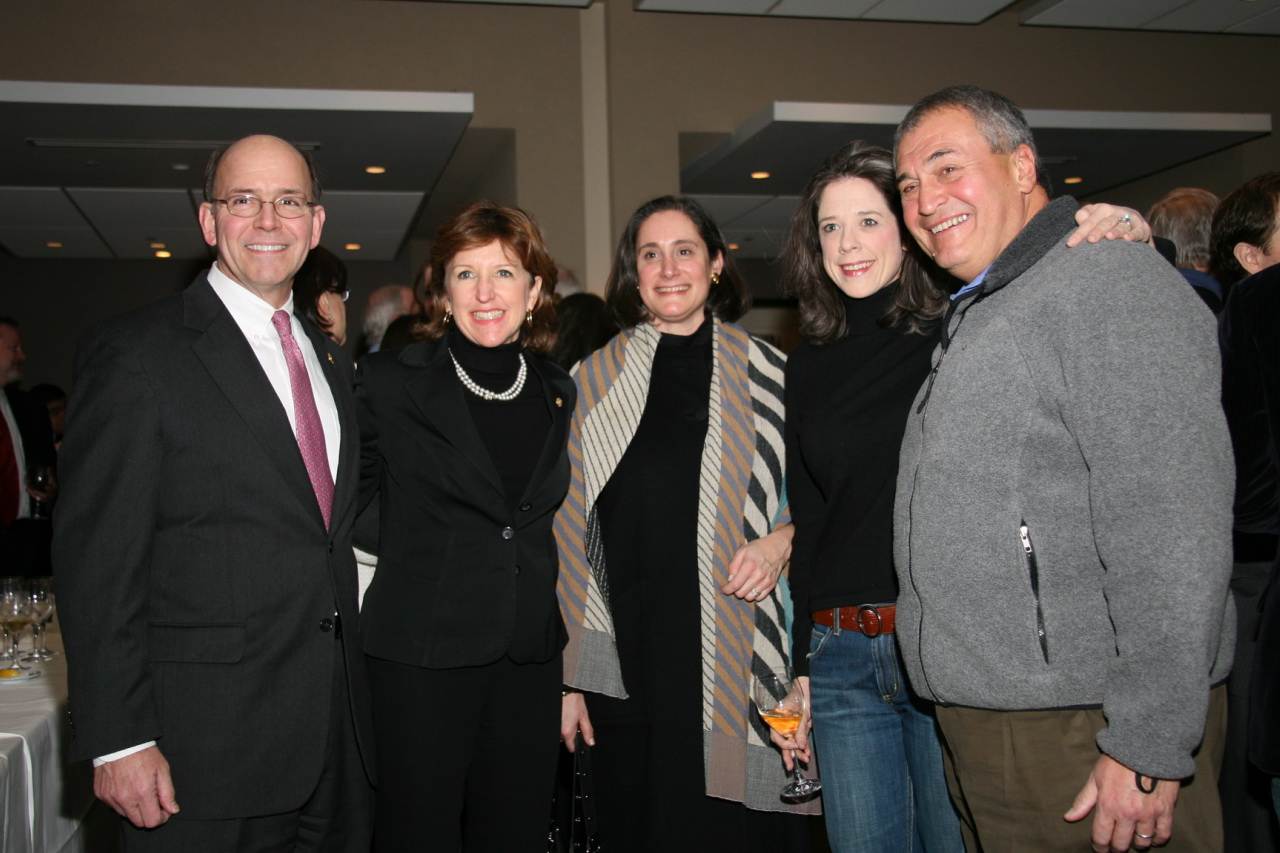
Senator Kay Hagan, Tony Podesta and Heather Podesta at a party hosted by the Podesta Group in Washington, D.C., in honor of the inauguration of Barack Obama, January 2009

On July 23, 2021, Huawei reportedly hired Podesta as consultant and lobbyist, with a goal of nurturing the company's relationship with the Biden administration.

== Investigation ==
In 2017, Tony Podesta came under scrutiny for failing to disclose the extent of his political work for a Ukrainian group tied to both adviser Paul Manafort and to the pro-Russian Ukrainian President Viktor Yanukovych in 2012.

=== Timeline of events ===
In April 2017, the Podesta Group retroactively filed new lobbying reports with the Justice Department that revealed more about its work for the European Centre for a Modern Ukraine (ECMU), a center founded by three senior members of the pro-Russia Party of Regions.

On October 23, 2017, Podesta was reportedly facing criminal inquiry in Robert Mueller's investigation regarding this lobbying campaign which ran between 2012 and 2014.

On October 30, 2017, Podesta announced that he would leave the Podesta Group.

On July 31, 2018, it was reported that Podesta was referred by special counsel Robert Mueller to federal prosecutors for investigation in New York.

On September 24, 2019, the Department of Justice concluded the probe of Tony Podesta with no charges.

== External lists ==
- Appearances on C-SPAN
