= Heather Podesta =

American lawyer, lobbyist, and art collector

Heather Miller Podesta
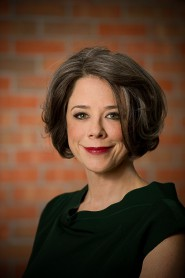
- Podesta in 2013
- Born: January 8, 1970 (age 56)
- Education: University of Virginia School of Law (JD); University of California, Berkeley
- Occupations: Lawyer; lobbyist
- Spouse: Tony Podesta (m. 2003; div. 2014)

Heather Miller Podesta (born January 8, 1970) is an American lawyer, lobbyist, and art collector based in Washington, D.C. She is the founder and CEO of Invariant, a leading bipartisan government relations and strategic communications firm. She was formerly married to Tony Podesta.

== Career ==
Podesta received her J.D. degree from the University of Virginia Law School and graduated with honors from the University of California, Berkeley.

Podesta worked as a congressional aide to members of Congress, including U.S. Representatives Robert Matsui and Earl Pomeroy, and US Senator Bill Bradley. She also served as assistant general counsel at the Air Transport Association and general counsel at the Airlines Clearing House.

In 2007, Podesta founded Heather Podesta + Partners, which, as of 2012, was the nation's largest woman-owned government relations firm. The firm's lobbying clients include companies in energy, finance, healthcare, retail, real estate, education, transportation, and weapons.

In 2010, the National Law Journal ranked Podesta as one of "Washington's Most Influential Women Lawyers". In 2012, National Journal ranked Podesta as one of "Washington's Most Influential Women" and GQ named her one of the "50 Most Powerful People in Washington". The Hill has repeatedly named her one of its "Top Lobbyists".

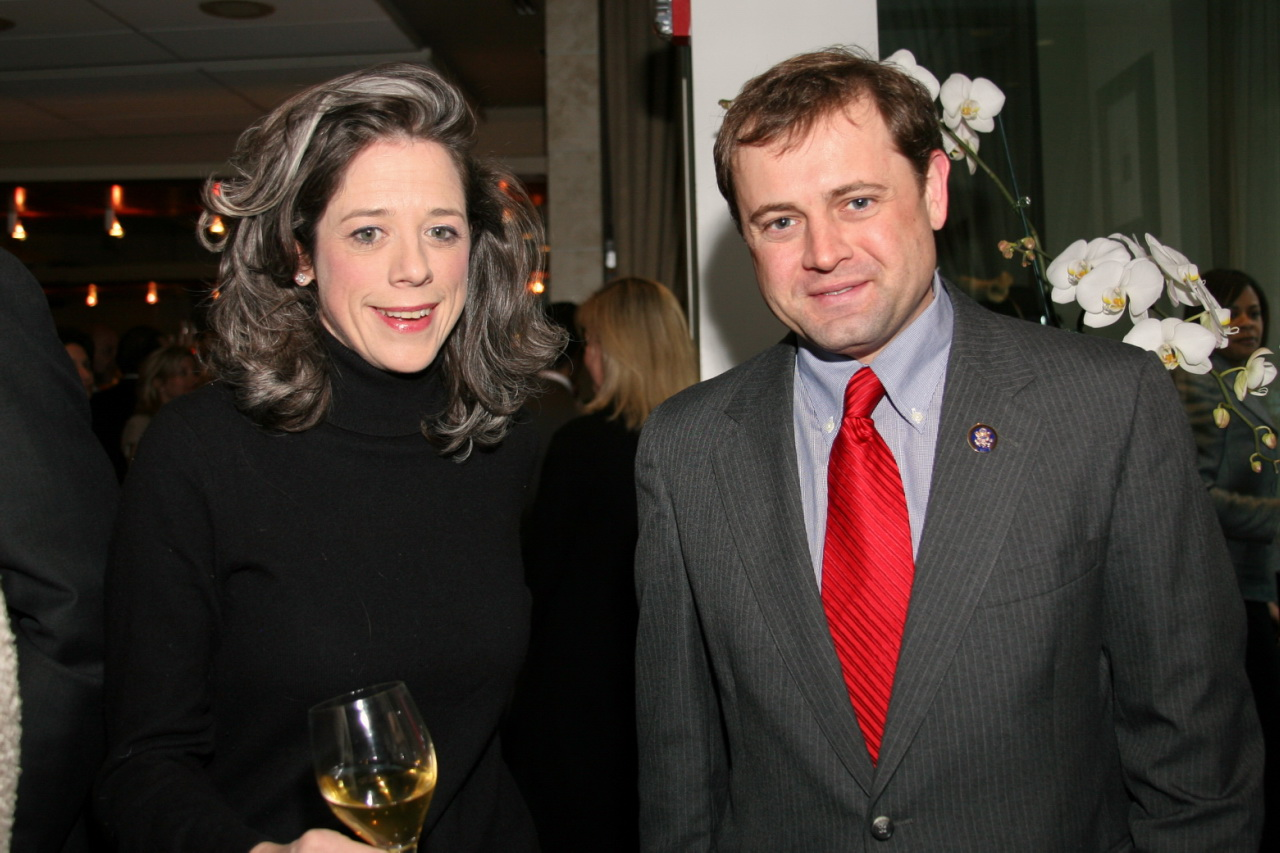
Heather Podesta and United States House of Representatives Tom Perriello from Virginia's 5th Congressional District in 2009

Podesta was once known for supporting and advising Democratic candidates across the country. In the 2012 federal election cycle, Podesta and her colleagues bundled more than $300,000 on behalf of the Democratic Senatorial Campaign Committee, Democratic Congressional Campaign Committee, the Senate Majority PAC, and individual Democratic candidates.

On March 29, 2017, Podesta renamed her firm from "Heather Podesta + Partners" to "Invariant". She also began to hire Republicans.

The firm has since lobbied for large insurance corporations such as Prudential and New York Life.

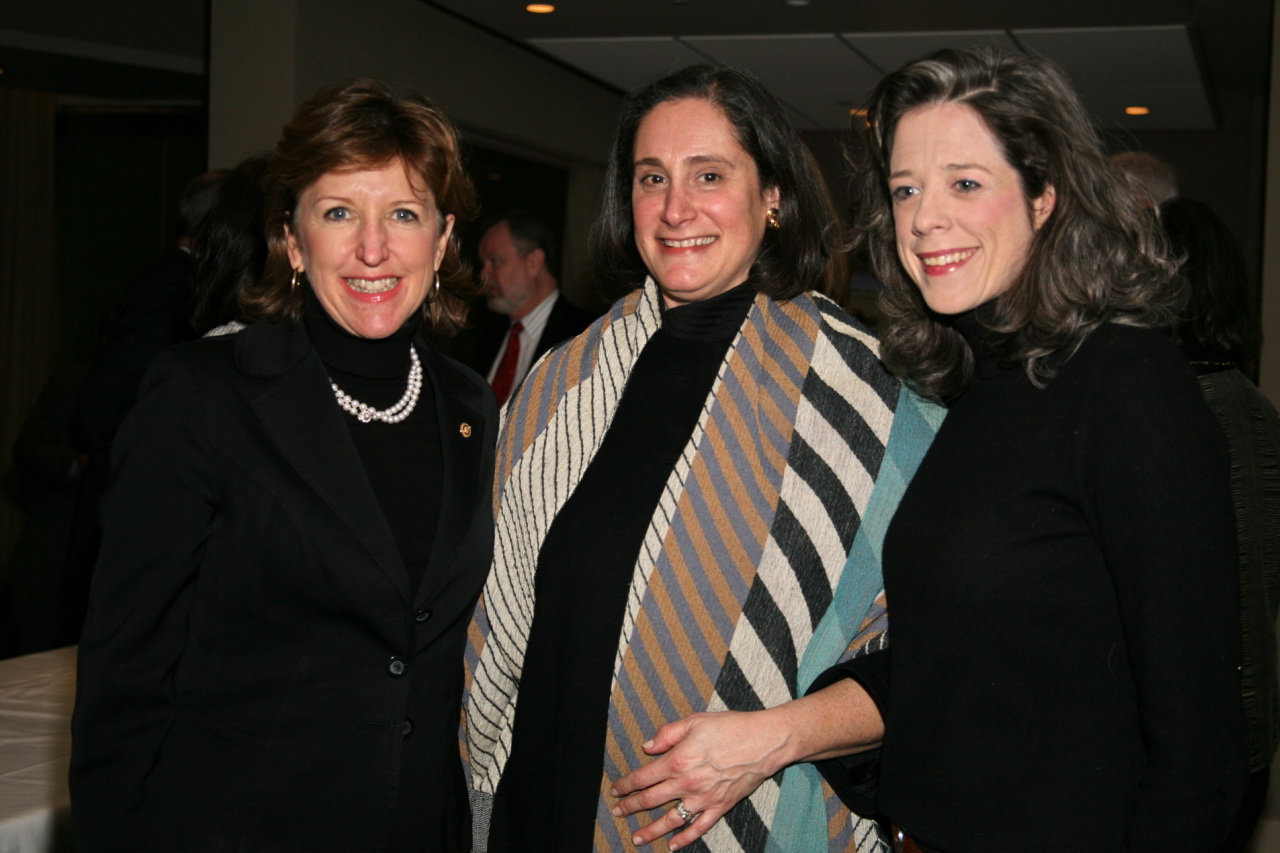
Senator Kay Hagan of North Carolina, Susan Fisher Sterling, director of the National Museum of Women in the Arts and Heather Podesta at a 2009 party in Washington, D.C.

Podesta sits on the National Advisory Council of the Institute of Governmental Studies. She is a member of the Board of Trustees of Ford's Theatre and serves on the Washington D.C. Police Foundation Board.

== Art collection ==
Podesta, a member of the Board of Trustees of the Museum of Contemporary Art, Los Angeles, is an avid collector of contemporary art. In 2009, Podesta donated Shepard Fairey's iconic Barack Obama "Hope" poster to the National Portrait Gallery in Washington, D.C.

She was named one of the "Philanthropic 50" by Washington Life in 2010. She was named by ARTnews as one of the 200 top collectors in 2012 and 2013.

== Personal life ==
Heather Podesta is the daughter of Sanford Miller, a distinguished professor of mathematics at SUNY Brockport, and Leslie Jill Miller, an executive with Xerox.

In 2012, Podesta was named by Washingtonian as a "Style Setter."

She married Tony Podesta in 2003; they divorced in 2014.
