= Vin Weber =

American politician

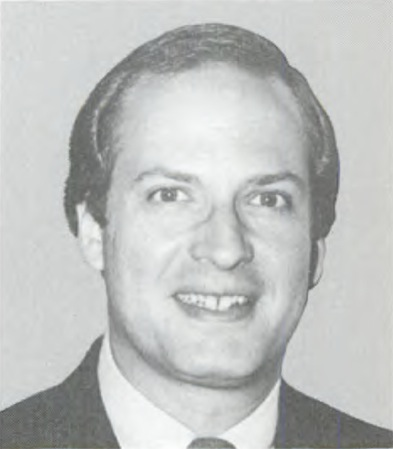
- Weber in 1991

Secretary of the House Republican Conference
- In office January 3, 1989 – January 3, 1993
- Leader: Bob Michel
- Preceded by: Robert J. Lagomarsino
- Succeeded by: Tom DeLay

Member of the U.S. House of Representatives from Minnesota
- In office January 3, 1981 – January 3, 1993
- Preceded by: Rick Nolan
- Succeeded by: David Minge
- Constituency: 6th district (1981–1983); 2nd district (1983–1993)

Personal details
- Born: John Vincent Weber; July 24, 1952 (age 74) Slayton, Minnesota, U.S.
- Party: Republican
- Education: University of Minnesota, Twin Cities (attended)

John Vincent Weber (born July 24, 1952) is an American politician and lobbyist from Minnesota. A member of the Republican Party, he served as a member of the United States House of Representatives from 1981 to 1993.

== Early life and education ==
Weber was born in Slayton, Minnesota. He attended the University of Minnesota, Twin Cities from 1970 to 1974.

== Career ==
Weber watches as President George W. Bush delivers remarks at the Chamber of Commerce in November 2003

Weber was press secretary to Representative Tom Hagedorn from 1974 to 1975 and a senior aide to Senator Rudy Boschwitz from 1977 to 1980. He had been the co-publisher of Murray County, Minnesota newspaper from 1976 to 1978 and the president of Weber Publishing Company. Weber was a delegate to the Minnesota State Republican conventions in 1972 and 1978. In 1980, at the age of 28, he was elected to the U. S. House of Representatives, defeating Archie Baumann, 53% to 47%. Baumann had been an aide to former Representative Rick Nolan.

Weber chose not to run for reelection in 1992 and retired from Congress following the House banking scandal, in which he was implicated for writing 125 bad checks worth nearly $48,000.

As secretary of the House Republican Conference and key adviser to incoming Speaker Newt Gingrich, he was considered one of the architects of the Republicans' success in 1994. He was a commentator on NPR the following year about developments in Congress after the Republicans took control of the House, providing commentary on the "revolution" he had helped create. Fairness and Accuracy in Reporting reported that Weber frequently offered his opinions on NPR about health care issues, but never revealed that he was a paid lobbyist for several health insurance giants.

Weber was a member of the now defunct Project for the New American Century (PNAC) and was one of the signers of the PNAC Letter sent to US President Bill Clinton on January 26, 1998, advocating "the removal of Saddam Hussein’s regime from power", along with Dick Cheney, Donald Rumsfeld and 29 other notable Republicans.

Weber opened and managed the Washington, D.C. branch of lobbying firm Clark & Weinstock. In 2006, home mortgage giant Freddie Mac paid Weber $360,297 to lobby on its behalf to fend off meaningful regulation in the lead-up to the subprime mortgage crisis. Weber also lobbied for Gazprom, Russia's state-owned natural gas company. In 2011, Clark & Weinstock merged with Mercury, and Weber became a partner in the combined firm.

Weber is a prominent strategist in the Republican Party, serving as a top advisor on Dole for president in 1996, the Bush reelection campaign in 2004, and Mitt Romney for president in 2008. Weber is chairman of the National Endowment for Democracy, a private, nonprofit organization designed to strengthen democratic institutions around the world through nongovernmental efforts. He is a senior fellow at the Humphrey Institute at the University of Minnesota, where he is co-director of the Policy Forum. He also serves on the advisory board of the Institute for Law and Politics at the University of Minnesota Law School and the nonprofit radio show America Abroad.

Weber is a board member of several private-sector and nonprofit organizations, including the now-defunct ITT Technical Institute, Department 56, and the Aspen Institute. He also serves on the board of The Council on Foreign Relations and co-chaired the Independent Task Force on U.S. Policy toward Reform in the Arab World with former United States Secretary of State Madeleine Albright. In addition, Weber is a member of the United States Secretary of Energy's advisory board.

Weber was one of the Republicans who turned against the surprise Donald Trump candidacy, telling CNBC on August 3, 2016, "I can't imagine I'd remain a Republican if he becomes president." But in 2019, Weber said that the Trump administration "was not as bad as I thought it would be" and that he would "probably" support Trump for reelection.

On August 17, 2016, the Associated Press reported that Mercury Public Affairs LLC, which Weber heads, had received $1.02 million from Paul Manafort's European Centre for a Modern Ukraine to lobby Congress to support pro-Russia Viktor Yanukovych during the Autumn 2012 Ukrainian elections and to block the release from prison of Yanukovich's rival, Yulia Tymoshenko. For his lobbying Congress on behalf of pro-Russia entities, Weber received at least $700,000.

Established in 2012, the European Centre for a Modern Ukraine had been supported by Yanukovich's pro-Russia Party of Regions and continued to pay Mercury for lobbying until February 2014, when Yanukovich fled Ukraine for Russia after the Maidan revolution. From 2012 until February 2014 and directed by Paul Manafort and Rick Gates, Weber, who was the principal for Mercury's Ukraine-related lobbying portfolio beginning in 2012, acted as an unregistered agent of a foreign government and foreign political party, a felony offense under the Foreign Agents Registration Act (FARA), with a penalty of up to five years in prison and a fine of up to $250,000. On April 28, 2017, Mercury retroactively filed with FARA within the Justice Department that it had been hired by the European Centre for a Modern Ukraine. Mercury had filed its lobbying efforts with Congress under the Lobbying Disclosure Act of 1995. Files between Mercury and the Manafort and Gates firms connected to Yanukovich and his Party of Regions were subpoenaed by the Mueller special counsel investigation.

In July 2018, New York prosecutors were referred by Mueller to investigate any wrongdoing by Weber and Mercury Public Affairs LLC. The United States Department of Justice dropped the probe of Weber and Mercury Public Affairs LLC in September 2019.

== See also ==
- Podesta Group, another lobbying group hired by Paul Manafort and Rick Gates from 2012 until February 2014
- Stop Trump movement

U.S. House of Representatives
Preceded by Rick Nolan	Member of the U.S. House of Representatives from Minnesota's 6th congressional district 1981–1983	Succeeded by Gerry Sikorski
Preceded by Tom Hagedorn	Member of the U.S. House of Representatives from Minnesota's 2nd congressional district 1983–1993	Succeeded by David Minge
Party political offices
New office	Chair of the Conservative Opportunity Society; 1983–1989	Succeeded by Bob Walker
Preceded by Robert J. Lagomarsino	Secretary of the House Republican Conference; 1989–1993	Succeeded by Tom DeLay
U.S. order of precedence (ceremonial)
Preceded by Eric Swalwell as Former U.S. Representative	Order of precedence of the United States as Former U.S. Representative	Succeeded by Tim Penny as Former U.S. Representative
