= European Centre for a Modern Ukraine =

- Abbreviation: ECFMU
- Founded: 1 February 2012
- Founder: Leonid Kozhara (president), Vitaliy Kahlyshnyy (finance), Ina Kirsch – Van de Water (secretary)
- Type: vzw
- Legal status: dissolved and liquidation closed since 29 June 2016
- Purpose: political advocacy group, enhancing Ukraine–European Union relations
- Headquarters: Brussels
- Location: Wetenschapsstraat 14b, Brussels
- Region served: Ukraine, European Union
- Key people: Oleksiy Plotnikov (president), Oleg Nadosha (secretary), Ina Kirsch – Van de Water (executive)
- Website: www.modernukraine.eu

The European Centre for a Modern Ukraine (ECFMU) was an organisation based in Brussels and operating internationally. It described itself as "an advocate for enhancing EU-Ukraine relations".

== Operation ==
It has been described by the Ukrayinska Pravda newspaper as "an operation controlled by Yanukovych" (Viktor Yanukovych, President of Ukraine from February 2010 until February 2014) and tied to Serhiy Klyuyev and Yanukovich's Party of Regions. In 2012, it had contracts with the American lobbying firms Mercury, who received $560,000 over 2 years, and the Podesta Group, who received $900,000 over 2 years. However, the source of the funding remains unclear since it listed its budget for the financial year ending in November 2012 as only €10,000.

Its street address was the same as that of the Ukrainian nationalist Svoboda party representative office that was opened in Brussels in August 2013.

== Liquidation ==
In the 29 June 2016, the Belgian Official Journal annex published its immediate liquidation agreed without debts on 1 January 2016, as registered in Brussels on 17 June 2016. The defunct company's books were assigned for five years at Ina Kirsch, Van de Water's address in Linthe, Germany. The last administrators were Oleksiy Plotnikov, Oleg Nadosha and Kseniia Soloviova. A power of attorney authorizes a Moore Stephens representative to act on behalf of the succession.

== Investigation ==
"The Centre effectively ceased to operate upon the downfall of Yanukovych in 2014".

According to the 31-page 23 February 2018 superseding indictment of Paul Manafort by Special Counsel Robert Mueller, "the Centre" reported to the First Vice Prime Minister of Ukraine.

The document also alleges that Manafort worked with an unnamed ex-chancellor as part of a group that received more than €2 million. A US regulatory filing states that speakers at the Centre's events included Aleksander Kwaśniewski, the former president of Poland; Alfred Gusenbauer, the former chancellor of Austria; and Romano Prodi, the former prime Minister of Italy.

== See also ==
- Special Counsel investigation (2017–2019)
- Tony Podesta
- Vin Weber
- Andriy Klyuyev
