= J. Bruce Llewellyn =

American businessman

James Bruce Llewellyn (July 16, 1927 – April 7, 2010) was an American businessman who co-founded the 100 Black Men of America, a social and philanthropic organization, in 1963. In 1985, he and a group of business partners, among them Julius Erving, Bill Cosby, and Shahara Ahmad-Llewellyn, bought a majority share of the Philadelphia Coca-Cola Bottling Company.

== Early life ==
Llewellyn was born in Harlem in Manhattan, the son of a Jamaican mother and a Guyanese father. Both of his parents came to the United States in 1921. After two years the family moved to Westchester County, settling in White Plains, in a predominantly white middle-class environment, though Llewellyn went to integrated schools. He worked in his father's bar and restaurant and sold magazines and Fuller Brush products. In 1943, Llewellyn joined the US Army, where he served as a first lieutenant.

== Family ==
Llewellyn's sister, Dorothy Cropper, became a judge on the New York State Court of Claims. His middle daughter, Alexandra Marie Llewellyn, was married to Tom Clancy. His wife of 30 years, Shahara Ahmad-Llewellyn, was vice chair of Philly Coke, serves as vice chair of Jazz at Lincoln Center, and was appointed by Michael Bloomberg to the NYC Commission on Women's issues. His youngest daughter, Jaylaan Ahmad-Llewellyn, is a Harvard graduate and founder of Bluhammock Music and Bluhorse Clothes. His mother, Nessa F. Llewellyn, a Jamaican immigrant, lived to be 102. Llewellyn was the brother-in-law of Shahara's sister Sharifa Alkhateeb. He was also an uncle by marriage to Suzanne de Passe through his second wife Jacqueline.

== Education ==
- City University of New York, BS
- New York Law School, JD (1960)
- Columbia University, MBA
- New York University, MPA

== Career ==
- Harlem liquor store, 1952–1956, proprietor
- New York County district-attorney's office, 1958–1960, student assistant
- Evans, Berger, & Llewellyn, 1962–1965
- Housing and Redevelopment Board of New York City, 1964–1965
- Small Business Development Corporation, 1965–1967, regional director
- New York City Housing and Development Administration, 1967–1969, Deputy Commissioner of Housing
- Fedco Food Stores, 1969–1984, president
- Freedom National Bank in Harlem, 1971-, board member, 1973-1975 chairman
- Overseas Private Investment Corporation, 1977–1981, head
- Dickstein, Shapiro, & Morin, 1982–1983, partner
- Philadelphia Coca-Cola Bottling Company, 1985–2008, chairman and chief executive officer
- WKBW-TV, 1986–1989, chairman

== Awards ==
- Golden Plate Award of the American Academy of Achievement presented by Awards Council member Julius Erving, 1993
- Among Black Enterprise magazine's top black business owners, 2001
- Inducted into the Black Entrepreneurs Hall of Fame, 2004
- President's Medal of Honor, New York University, 2004
- Recipient of more than ten honorary doctorate degrees

== Death ==
Llewellyn died of renal failure at the age 82, in New York City.
