= Tami Gaines =

- Occupation: Author, Business Strategist, Motivational Speaker
- Notable work: Preemie Parents: 26 Ways to Grow with Your Premature Baby ISBN 1416206302

Tami Gaines is a marketing and business strategist, author, motivational speaker, and trainer.

== Career ==
Gaines has served on the Board of Directors of the New Jersey Small Business Development Centers and the Imani College Advocacy Program.

She has won the Women in Business Future Achievers, New Jersey Chamber of Commerce, the Columbia University Service Award from the Columbia Graduate School of Business and was voted "One of 1999's Women to Know" by the Y.W.C.A.

Gaines founded the Preemie Parents Foundation to provide resources for parents of premature babies.

=== Author ===
Gaines wrote Preemie Parents: 26 Little Ways to Grow With Your Premature Baby to help those struggle with the issues associated with the delivery of a premature baby. The book was published by Sellers Publishing, March 2, 2011.

== Bibliography ==
- Preemie Parents: 26 Little Ways to Grow With Your Premature Baby, Sellers Publishing Inc., 2011. ISBN 1416206302, 978-1416206309
