= Caroline Finkelstein =

American poet

- Born: 1940; New York City
- Died: 2016 (aged 75–76); Atlanta, Georgia
- Education: Goddard College
- Occupation: Poet
- Relatives: David I. Shapiro (brother)

Caroline Finkelstein (born New York City, April, 1940, died Atlanta, February, 2016) was an American poet.

== Life ==
Finkelstein was the second child of Louis and Rasha (Rae) Shapiro, clothing merchants in Manhattan. Her brother, David I. Shapiro, became a noted Washington lawyer. As a girl, Finkelstein led what she calls “a bifurcated life, half American, half some idea of upper bourgeois European society....This upbringing maintains itself in many of my poems as mood, or attitude, or actual subject matter.”

She was married at nineteen to Jack Finkelstein, a pediatric neurologist. They had three children: Adam, Gabriel, and Nicholas. She divorced in 1977 and later married the poet Robert Clinton, whom she also divorced.

Having dropped out of Barnard College after one term, she earned an M.F.A. at Goddard College, where she studied with Ellen Bryant Voigt, Robert Hass, and Michael Ryan. She was at Yaddo and the MacDowell Colony.

In Vermont she became good friends with Donald Hall. She visited Jane Kenyon shortly before her death.

She has published her work in Poetry, The Gettysburg Review, Fence, The Paris Review, Seneca Review, New American Writing, and The American Poetry Review.

She last lived in Roswell, Georgia.

== Awards ==
- Two fellowships from the National Endowment for the Arts
- Massachusetts Cultural Council and the Vermont Arts Council grants
- 1999 Amy Lowell Poetry Travelling Scholarship
- Fellow at the MacDowell Colony

== Works ==
- "Autumn Again". Virginia Quarterly Review: 501–502. Summer 1993.
- "The Lovers". Virginia Quarterly Review: 500–501. Summer 1993. Archived from the original on December 27, 2010.
- "After a Vermont Pond, 1977". Salon Magazine. March 16, 2004. Archived from the original on June 6, 2011.

=== Poetry Books ===
- Windows Facing East. Dragon Gate Press. 1986. ISBN 978-0-937872-30-7.
- Germany. Carnegie Mellon University Press. 1995. ISBN 978-0-88748-193-2.
- Justice. Carnegie Mellon University Press. 1999. ISBN 978-0-88748-297-7.
- The Moment.

=== Ploughshares ===
- "Drift Road". Ploughshares. Spring 2003. Archived from the original on 2003-09-17.
- "Conjecture Number One Thousand". Ploughshares. Fall 2001. Archived from the original on 2002-07-23.
- "Baci, Of Course". Ploughshares. Fall 2001. Archived from the original on 2002-07-23.

== Quotes ==
About her poem "Conjecture Number One Thousand", Finkelstein wrote: “I wrote [the poem] while I was a fellow at the MacDowell Colony. It’s a rueful comment on my second marriage and an attempt at checking the longing that lives in my memories. The irony and occasional flippancy replicate much of the marriage’s shape. Being at MacDowell, where my former husband and I had once attended, only heightened the senses of loss and comedy within that loss.”
