= Gabriel Finkelstein =

Gabriel Finkelstein (born 1963) is an historian of science. He has written on 19th-century biology, exploration, and historiography.

== Career ==
After studying physics at Amherst College (B.A., 1985) and history at Princeton University (Ph.D., 1996), Finkelstein worked at the University of Pennsylvania, the University of Göttingen, UCLA, and Princeton University before joining the University of Colorado Denver in 1999. He was promoted to Associate Professor of History in 2006. In 2022 he visited the Institut des Maladies Neurodégénératives, Université de Bordeaux, as a Fellow.

The eight years that Finkelstein spent in France and Germany had a significant influence on his research, which focuses on the German neuroscientist and public intellectual Emil du Bois-Reymond. Finkelstein's biography received an Honorable Mention in the History of Science category of the American Publishers Awards for Professional and Scholarly Excellence (PROSE Awards), was named by the American Association for the Advancement of Science as one of the Best Books of 2014, and was shortlisted for the 2014 John Pickstone Prize, awarded biennially by the British Society for the History of Science and considered one of the most prestigious prizes for scholarly books in the field. The biography has also been discussed by The Guardian, The Scientist, New Books Network, Scientific American, Il Sole 24 Oro, and numerous blogs.

Additionally, Finkelstein advised Hubert Sauper on his documentary film Darwin's Nightmare (2004), which was nominated for an Academy Award.

Gabriel Finkelstein is the son of the neurologist Jack Finkelstein and the poet Caroline Finkelstein and nephew of the lawyer David I. Shapiro. His brother Adam Finkelstein breeds queen bees.

== Publications (select) ==
- “Haeckel and du Bois-Reymond: Rival German Darwinists.” Theory in Biosciences 138, no. 1 (May 2019): 105–112.
- Emil du Bois-Reymond: Neuroscience, Self, and Society in Nineteenth-Century Germany. Cambridge; London: The MIT Press, 2013. ISBN 978-1-4619-5032-5. OCLC 864592470
- "Autorité rhétorique: Claude Bernard et Émile du Bois-Reymond." In Les élèves de Claude Bernard : Les nouvelles disciplines bernardiennes au tournant du XX^{e} siècle, ed. Jean-Gäel Barbara and Pierre Corvol, 173–192. Paris: Éditions Hermann, 2012.
- “Romanticism, Race, and Recapitulation.” Science 294, no. 5549 (7 December 2001): 2101–2102.
- “‘Conquerors of the Künlün’? The Schlagintweit Mission to High Asia, 1854–57.” History of Science 38, pt. 2, no. 120 (June 2000): 179–218.
