= List of acts of the Parliament of Western Australia from 1983 =

This is a list of acts of the Parliament of Western Australia for the year 1983.

== 1983 ==
Short title, or popular name	Citation	Royal assent
Long title
Prevention of Excessive Prices Act 1983 or the Petroleum Products Pricing Act 1983	No. 1 of 1983	25 March 1983
An Act with respect to the regulation of the prices or rates charged for goods or services, and for incidental and other purposes.
Daylight Saving Act 1983	No. 11 of 1983	28 October 1983
An Act to provide for a trial period of daylight saving throughout the State and a referendum thereafter on the question of daylight saving on a permanent basis, to alter standard time accordingly if the majority of electors indicates approval of daylight saving in the referendum and to repeal the Daylight Saving Act 1974. (Note: Daylight Saving Act 1974 (No. 13))
Small Business Development Corporation Act 1983	No. 46 of 1983	5 December 1983
An Act to make provision for the establishment of a Small Business Development Corporation to encourage, promote, facilitate and assist the establishment, development, and carrying on of small business in the State and for incidental and other purposes.
	No. X of 1983	
Western Australian Development Corporation Act 1983	No. 87 of 1983	29 December 1983
An Act to establish a corporation to promote the development of economic activity in Western Australia.

== Sources ==
- "legislation.wa.gov.au".
