= McDermott Will & Schulte =

American law firm

- Headquarters: River Point; Chicago, Illinois
- No. of offices: 20+
- No. of attorneys: 1750
- No. of employees: 3,200+
- Major practice areas: General practice
- Key people: Edward H. McDermott (co-founder); William M. Emery (co-founder); Ira Coleman (chairman)
- Revenue: ▲$1.82 billion USD (2022)
- Profit per equity partner: ▲$3.32 million USD (2022)
- Date founded: February 2, 1934
- Founder: Edward H. McDermott; William M. Emery
- Company type: multiple limited liability partnerships
- Website: mwe.com

McDermott Will & Schulte (formerly McDermott Will & Emery) is an international law firm with a diversified corporate practice. It represents commercial, industrial, and financial enterprises.

== History ==
Chicago lawyers Edward H. McDermott and William M. Emery founded the firm in 1934. They were initially focused as a tax law firm, and a corporate department was established in 1941 when Howard A. Will joined the firm. As the century progressed, the firm added capabilities across the legal spectrum, eventually opening eight more offices. By 1984, the firm had amassed one hundred fifty lawyers. Over the ensuing twenty years, the firm grew; in 2004, McDermott numbered over one thousand lawyers.

In November 2023, amid a wave of protests calling for a ceasefire in the Gaza War at elite U.S. law schools, McDermott Will & Emery was among a group of major law firms that sent a letter to top law school deans warning them that an escalation in incidents targeting Jewish students would have corporate hiring consequences:

We look to you to ensure your students who hope to join our firms after graduation are prepared to be an active part of workplace communities that have zero tolerance policies for any form of discrimination or harassment, much less the kind that has been taking place on some law school campuses.

On August 1, 2025, the firm merged with Schulte Roth & Zabel, forming a new firm under the name McDermott Will & Schulte.

In November 2025, McDermott Will & Schulte embarked on assessing private equity investment into the firm's operations, by reshaping its practice with a management service organization (MSO).

== Organization ==
McDermott has more than 1,750 lawyers across more than 20 offices in the United States and Europe.

The firm consists of multiple legal entities that are coordinated through service agreements, including:

- McDermott Will & Emery LLP – based in Illinois, U.S., with other offices throughout the country
- McDermott Will & Emery AARPI (Note: In France, an AARPI or Association d'Avocats à Responsabilité Professionnelle Individuelle (Association of Lawyers with Individual Professional Responsibility) is a form of limited liability partnership established by a 1954 government decree rescinding the prohibition on joint exercise structures in the legal profession.) – France
- McDermott Will & Emery Belgium LLP – based in Delaware, U.S., with offices in Belgium
- McDermott Will & Emery Rechtsanwälte Steuerberater LLP – based in Delaware, U.S., with offices in Germany
- McDermott Will & Emery Studio Legale Associato (Note: In Italy, a Studio Legale Associato (Associated Legal Practice) is similar in structure to a limited liability partnership. They were first established in 1997 when a law was passed rescinding a previous prohibition on libero professionisti (lawyers, accountants, doctors, chartered surveyors, etc.) forming such partnerships.) – Italy
- McDermott Will & Emery UK LLP – United Kingdom

== Recognition and rankings ==
- In 2009, the Human Rights Campaign named McDermott Will & Emery as one of the record numbers of US companies earning the top rating of 100 percent in its annual Corporate Equality Index.
- In 2006, The National Law Journal named McDermott one of the top 15 defense litigation law firms in the United States on its annual Defense Hot List. Also in 2006, the firm was named one of the top 10 law firms on BTI Consulting Group's Market Movers list.

== Notable alumni ==
- Fernando L. Aenlle-Rocha, California state court judge
- Neil Auerbach, co-founder of Hudson Clean Energy Partners
- Steven Baddour, member of the Democratic Party and a former member of the Massachusetts Senate representing the 1st Essex District
- M. Miller Baker, judge of the United States Court of International Trade
- Andrew Batavia, disability rights activist, health policy researcher, author, and associate professor at Florida International University
- Robert J. Cordy, former associate justice of the Massachusetts Supreme Judicial Court
- Lanny Davis, political operative, lawyer, consultant, lobbyist, author, and television commentator
- Eric Hargan, former United States Deputy Secretary of Health and Human Services
- Jerrold Hercenberg, subject-matter expert for the healthcare and health insurance industries
- Lucy Koh, United States district judge of the United States District Court for the Northern District of California
- E. Grey Lewis, former general counsel of the Navy
- Jim Moran, former U.S. representative for Virginia's 8th congressional district in Northern Virginia
- Anne Pramaggiore, former senior executive vice president and CEO of Exelon Utilities
- Atif Qarni, Democratic politician and Virginia Secretary of Education
- Neil F. Quinter, former member of the Maryland House of Delegates
- Larry Ribstein, law professor and author
- Andrew Sherman, corporate and transactional lawyer and author and senior partner at Seyfarth Shaw
- Bryan Steil, member of the Republican party who serves as the U.S. representative for Wisconsin's 1st congressional district
- Bill Weld, former governor of Massachusetts
- Michael Wilder, American chess grandmaster

== See also ==
list of largest law firms by revenue
