= Dickstein Shapiro =

U.S. law firm and lobbying group

Dickstein Shapiro LLP
- Headquarters: Washington, D.C.
- No. of offices: 4
- No. of attorneys: approximately 400
- No. of employees: approximately 800
- Major practice areas: Litigation, intellectual property, public policy, corporate law, insurance law, antitrust
- Key people: James D. Kelly, Chairman
- Revenue: $281 million
- Date founded: 1953
- Company type: Limited liability partnership
- Website: Dicksteinshapiro.com

Dickstein Shapiro LLP (formerly Dickstein, Shapiro, Morin & Oshinsky) was a large U.S. law firm and lobbying group based in Washington, D.C., with five offices across the United States. According to the National Law Journal's 2012 rankings, it was the 128th largest law firm in the United States. The firm also ranked 75th in profit per attorney on the 2012 AmLaw 200 survey.

== Practice areas ==
The firm was divided into six practice groups, each of which handle various aspects of their respective specialties: Complex Dispute resolution, Corporate & Finance, Government Law & Strategy (includes lobbying, political law, regulatory law and government contracts), Insurance coverage, Intellectual property, and Litigation.

=== Pro Bono ===
Dickstein Shapiro was recognized by the District of Columbia Bar for its leadership in pro bono representation. It was one of the law firms representing the detainees at the Guantanamo Bay detention camp.

== History ==
Dickstein Shapiro was founded by Sidney Dickstein and David I. Shapiro in New York City in 1953. By 1956, the firm moved its headquarters to Washington, D.C. The firm quickly established its reputation by winning several high-profile cases, including Silver v. New York Stock Exchange before the United States Supreme Court.

Over the following decades, the firm grew organically and through lateral hiring. In 2001, Dickstein Shapiro merged with Roberts, Sheridan & Kotel, a New York boutique firm that had spun off from Cravath, Swaine & Moore and which was primarily focused on corporate finance and tax law.

In 2012, the firm entered into merger discussions with San Francisco–based international firm Pillsbury Winthrop, but those talks ended by early 2013.

Dickstein Shapiro hired former Republican Speaker of the House Dennis Hastert as a lobbyist shortly after he resigned his seat in Congress. Hastert was later indicted in May 2015 on charges of illegally withdrawing money from banks to pay hush money to an individual that he committed misconduct against years ago. Hastert resigned his lobbyist position the day the indictment was unsealed. Hastert's biography was quickly removed from the firm's website, and the firm also purged all mentions of Hastert from its previously posted press releases. Hastert's resignation from Dickstein Shapiro following the indictment against him left the law firm and lobbying firm "reeling," according to news reports. The firm's lobbying business had already been struggling; it was reported that the firm had billed $130,000 on behalf of eight clients for the first quarter of 2015, "not close to being on track for its overall 2014 billings, when it brought in $3.7 million for the year." In the few years preceding the indictment, Dickstein Shapiro had already "faced an exodus of ... talent" to rival firms Greenberg Traurig and Cozen O'Connor, as well as "the loss of major client contracts" including Lorillard Tobacco Co., Peabody Energy Corp., Bayer Corp., and Covanta Energy Corp. Following the Hastert indictment, it was reported that Dickstein Shapiro's biggest domestic client, Fuels America, terminated its lobbying contract with the firm.

In February 2016, it was announced that the firm would discontinue operation and that Blank Rome would hire approximately 100 of its lawyers. Equity partners were expected to lose all of their firm capital.

== Offices ==
- Washington, D.C. (main office)
- New York City
- Los Angeles, California
- Stamford, Connecticut

== Notable lawyers and employees ==
- Seymour Glanzer, former Watergate scandal prosecutor, is now senior counsel to the firm.
- Pete Hoekstra, former U.S. Representative for Michigan's 2nd congressional district, currently a senior adviser to the government relations group.
- Tim Hutchinson, former U.S. Senator from Arkansas, currently senior advisor to the firm's Public Policy & Law practice.
- Scott E. Thomas, former Commissioner of the Federal Election Commission
- Albert Wynn, former U.S. Representative for Maryland's 4th congressional district, currently senior advisor to the firm's Public Policy & Law practice.

== Notable alumni ==
- Charles Colson, Special Counsel to President Richard Nixon from 1969 to 1973, founder of Prison Fellowship, Templeton Prize winner and cultural commentator
- Wendell H. Ford, former U.S. Senator from Kentucky, currently senior advisor to the firm's Public Policy & Law practice.
- Joseph H. Gale, Judge on the United States Tax Court, first openly gay man appointed to the Federal judiciary.
- Dennis Hastert, former Speaker of the United States House of Representatives, former senior advisor to the firm's Public Policy & Law practice. Resigned following a federal indictment was filed against him. Charges include lying to the FBI about multiple money transfers to a past victim to hide past sexual misconduct.
- James R. Jones, former U.S. Congressman from Oklahoma and a former U.S. Ambassador to Mexico.
- Lewis "Scooter" Libby, former Chief of Staff to the Vice President of the United States (for Vice President Dick Cheney)
- J. Bruce Llewellyn, prominent African-American business leader and co-founder of 100 Black Men of America, an international civic and philanthropic organization
- James F. McGovern, former United States Under Secretary of the Air Force (from 1986 to 1989) and former President of Teledyne
- Floyd McKissick Jr., North Carolina State Senator
- David I. Shapiro, American civil liberties attorney
- Andrew Sherman, business author and transactional attorney
- Ira Lee Sorkin, American attorney best known for representing Bernard Madoff, the American businessman who has pleaded guilty to perpetrating the largest investor fraud ever committed by a single person.
- Joseph Tydings, former U.S. Senator from Maryland, previously of counsel to the firm.

== Notable clients ==
- Activision Blizzard
- AT&T
- BB&T Corporation
- Chrysler Group LLC
- Deephaven Capital Management
- Dole Food Company, Inc.
- Duke Energy
- Fannie Mae
- Fox Entertainment Group
- John Hinckley Jr., attempted assassin
- Stan Lee, co-creator of Spider-Man, the Hulk, the X-Men, the Fantastic Four, Iron Man, and other iconic comic book characters
- Loews Corporation
- Nike
- Olympus Corporation
- PepsiCo Inc.
- Pfizer Inc.
- Priceline.com
- Sempra Energy
- Sony Pictures Entertainment Inc.
- Under Armour, Inc.
- Yamaha Corporation
