= Jerrold Hercenberg =

Jerrold Jacob Hercenberg, JD, MPA, is a subject-matter expert for the healthcare and health insurance industry and has been on the cutting edge of numerous innovations over the last 30 years.

Jerry began his career in the federal government. He served on the staff the US House Budget Committee as an economist and manager of the Anti-Inflation Task Force during the late 1970s when inflation was out of control during the Carter Administration and helped to conduct hearings on inflation which helped the committee pass the annual budget legislation in 1980. He also served in the Health Care Financing Administration in the Office of the CFO where he contributed many ideas toward savings to the Government and received several awards from the Administrator and Secretary of HHS. Eventually, he became a Senior Advisor to the Administrator of the Centers for Medicare and Medicaid Services (formerly HCFA). While serving as the Chief Regulator for managed care plans, he authored the Medicare regulations that created Medicare and Medicaid risk contracts for managed care plans in the early 1980s. He then left the government to become an attorney and Of Counsel with the national law firm of McDermott Will & Emery, where he co-chaired that firm’s Employer Health Benefits Work Group serving numerous Fortune 500 companies and state budgets.

After many years of law practice, Jerry was recruited to become the Senior Vice President and Chief Counsel of PHP Healthcare Corporation, a diversified health care company which operated health clinics for major US Corporations, owned HMOs, and specialized in developing managed health care. PHP was an integrated delivery system which operated networks and health care clinical services in over 30 states. As a shareholder of PHP, Jerry represented over 40 different HMOs and PPOs that participated in the Medicare risk contract program. He was also a key figure in the development of the Oregon Medicaid program that greatly expanded care to children, provided managed care on a wide scale and defended its rationing program.

Later in life, Hercenberg used his expertise to start BeneSolutions, LLC, a firm that developed a new PPO solution for employer retiree plans with Medicare. He specializes in the areas of strategic design and analysis of retiree health plans and their options for coordinating coverage with Medicare and public programs.

Jerry is currently a Principal of Buck Consultants (recently acquired by Xerox), a leading employee benefits consulting and outsourcing firm. He continues to play an integral role in Buck, by working with major clients to design health plans that operate more efficiently.

Jerry has a JD from the University of Baltimore, a MPA (Finance) from American University and a BA from George Washington University. He was the author of a major book by BNA publications titled, The Catastrophic Protection Act of 1988: An Employer’s Guide to Compliance and Health Plan Redesign. He is also the author of 3 patents.
