= Andrew Sherman =

American lawyer (born 1961)

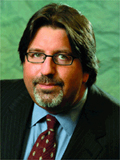
- Sherman in 2009
- Born: September 5, 1961 (age 65); Philadelphia, Pennsylvania, U.S.
- Education: University of Maryland (BA); American University (JD)
- Occupation: lawyer

Andrew J. Sherman (born September 5, 1961) is a corporate and transactional lawyer and author. He is currently a senior partner at the Washington, DC office of the law firm Brown Rudnick. He is also an adjunct professor for the MBA programs at McDonough School of Business at Georgetown University as well as at the Robert H. Smith School of Business at the University of Maryland, College Park. He has written 26 books, including Road Rules—Be the Truck, Not the Squirrel.

== Early life ==
Sherman grew up in West Philadelphia. He attended Lower Merion High School. In 1983, he graduated from the University of Maryland with a Bachelor of Arts degree, and in 1986 earned his Juris Doctor degree from American University, Washington College of Law

== Career ==
=== Lawyer ===
After running his own firm for several years, Sherman served as a partner in the Washington, DC offices of such large law firms as Greenberg Traurig, McDermott Will & Emery, and Dickstein Shapiro. In February 2009, he joined Jones Day in their Washington, DC office as a senior partner in the M&A and Corporate department.

Sherman was named on the Greater Washington "Legal Elite" list by Washington SmartCEO in 2006, and in the 2007, 2008, and 2009 editions of Chambers USA: America's Leading Lawyers for Business as a leading individual in the area of Corporate/M&A and Private Equity for the District of Columbia, as well as one of the "Leaders in their Field" by Chambers in 2014 in the area of Corporate/M&A and Private Equity. He was also recognized in the NACD Directorship 100: People to Watch list as one of the most influential people in corporate boardrooms. He is a member of the board of directors of the Center for International Private Enterprise. and is a part of the Intellectual Asset Management (IAM) Strategy 300 group, as one of the world's leading IP strategists.

=== Professor ===
Sherman has served as an adjunct professor of business management, strategy and planning at the University of Maryland's Robert H. Smith School of Business for over 20 years. During his time there, he has won several teaching awards, including the Krowe Award for Teaching Excellence in 2000, 2004 and 2008. For the past 12 years, he has been an adjunct professor in the MBA program at Georgetown University, where he teaches courses on business growth, capital formation and entrepreneurship. He also recently became an adjunct professor of law at Georgetown Law.

=== Author ===
Sherman has written 26 books on the legal and strategic aspects of business growth, mergers and acquisitions, capital formation, and the leveraging and licensing of intellectual property. His latest book, The Crisis of Disengagement, discusses the multifaceted workplace dilemma of disengagement, and examines how apathy and complacency effects leadership and governance, company culture, peers and team members, and individuals.

His book Harvesting Intangible Assets uses the metaphor of farming to describe innovation and leveraging intellectual property. Characterizing a company's role as that of an "intangible asset agrarian", he provides instructions for planning, planting, nurturing, cultivating, preparing to harvest, and ultimately selling a "bumper crop" by fully leveraging intangible assets and intellectual property. Sherman discussed these ideas in his Tedx Talk in January 2014.

His first non-business book, Road Rules: Be the Truck. Not the Squirrel. applies the metaphor of commuting to work in your car to driving down the road of life. Sherman discusses his inspiration and motivations for the book on The Connections Show audio podcast. In September 2009, he released a special Mothers Against Drunk Driving (MADD) edition of Road Rules: Be the Truck. Not the Squirrel. with a foreword by MADD National President Laura Dean-Mooney; 40% of the proceeds of its sale (at www.bethetruck.com) go directly to MADD.

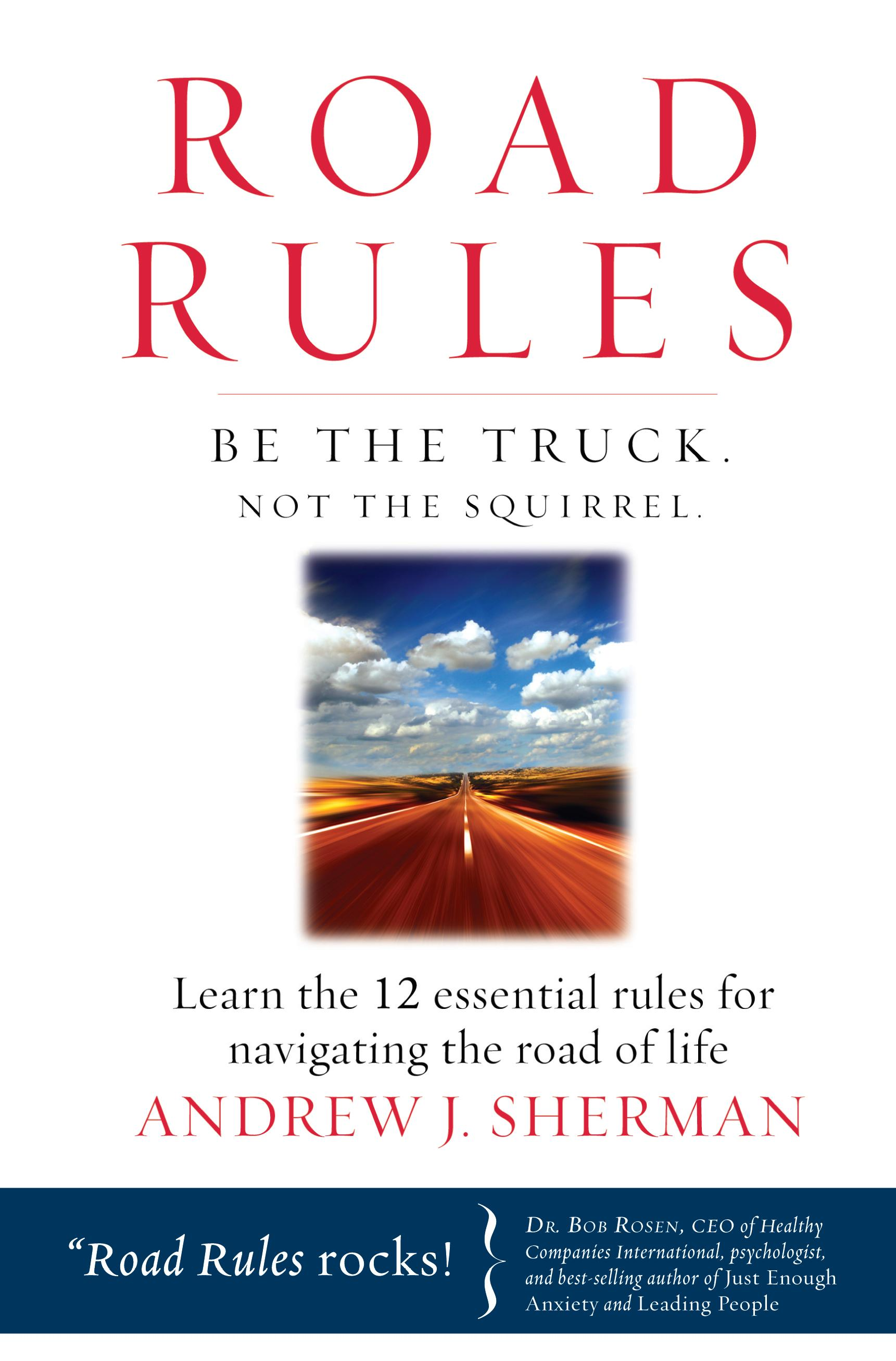
"Road Rules" book cover

== Media ==
Sherman is the founder of Grow Fast Grow Right, an education and training company with operations in the United States, Canada, India and Europe.

In 2001, Fortune magazine named Sherman one of the Top Ten Minds in Small Business.

In February 2006 Inc. magazine recognized Sherman as one of the 19 leading resources and advocates for growing companies in the nation.

Sherman was named one of the world's 50 leading business minds for the "50 Lessons From 50 Leaders" webcast series, which included business leaders such as JW Marriott, Richard Branson, Earl Graves and William Harrison. Sherman is also recognized as a Hinge Visible Expert, a lawyer who has attained high visibility and expertise.

Sherman has been featured as the cover story on a number of publications including Inc. magazine (May 2007) and Premiere Trade magazine (April 2006).

Sherman has been interviewed by or mentioned in The Wall Street Journal, USA Today, Investor's Business Daily, The New York Times, Business Week, Fortune, Daily Deal, The Washington Post, The Chicago Tribune, The Chicago Sun-Times, The Miami Herald, The Orlando Sentinel, Legal Times, The San Francisco Examiner, The Washington Times, Forbes magazine, U.S. News & World Report, Money magazine, Inc. magazine, CNNMoney.com, Dun & Bradstreet Reports, Black Enterprise magazine, and other news sources.

He is frequently interviewed on national and regional radio programs, including National Public Radio's Talk of The Nation, CBS News Radio, Associated Press (AP) Radio Network's Business Minute, various shows broadcast over The Business Radio Network (simultaneously broadcast in over 100 cities), and is a regular guest on the WTEM 570 Smart Business show (with John Hrastar) and the Taking Care of Business show on WMAL (with Brian Roberts).

In December 2009, Sherman participated in a two-part interview with Portfolio.com as part of The Great Global Business Adventure series, where he discussed globalization and its impact on small and mid-sized businesses.
