= Steuerberater =

Steuerberater (StB) is a professional title for tax advisers in Germany, regulated under the Tax Advisory Act (Steuerberatungsgesetz). Steuerberater help individuals and businesses with tax advice, tax returns and accounting. They also represent clients in tax matters, including proceedings before fiscal courts.

Applicants need relevant education and practical experience before taking a state examination the Steuerberaterprüfung. Certain applicants with extensive academic or public-service experience may qualify for an exemption from the examination. After passing the examination, applicants must be formally appointed by the regional chamber of tax advisers (Steuerberaterkammer).

Steuerberater are authorised to provide tax advice under German law. Other professionals with same authority are lawyers (Rechtsanwälte) and auditors (Wirtschaftsprüfer).

== Examination ("the Steuerberaterprüfung") ==
The Steuerberaterprüfung is a uniform nationwide state examination, the passing of which is normally the necessary condition for the appointment as German certified tax advisor (Steuerberater).

The exam includes a written part (with three exams of 6 hours each) and an oral examination. The written part of the Steuerberaterprüfung is held once every year in the beginning of the month of October.

=== General remarks ===
The Steuerberaterprüfung is considered one of the toughest and prestigious professional examinations in Germany, often compared with full university law studies, with the difference that examinees prepare for the Steuerberaterprüfung alongside their regular occupation (e.g. in the evenings or on weekends). Registration for the Steuerberaterprüfung is possible only if candidates already have considerable professional experience and technical knowledge (2 – 10 years, depending on educational background—see below).

The preparation time is usually long (2 – 3 years), whereby a full release from professional duties for approx. 4 – 5 months preceding the date of examination is common practice in many tax advisory firms. During this preparation time, most examinees attend professional courses, tutorials and/or mock exam events to gear up for the real examinations. Notably, certain providers even offer dedicated training camps in preparation for the Steuerberaterprüfung.

Yet, despite the high qualification of exams and the considerable technical and financial effort made by most candidates, the Steuerberaterprüfung is distinguished by a very low passing rate: Based on the long term average, the pass rate usually is at about 40% only with reference to all candidates registered for the exams and still at about 50% only with reference to those candidates who registered for the exams, appeared on the date of exams and effectively submitted their solutions to the exam board for review.

Given the low passing rate, a considerable number of examinees is typically resit candidates. Notably, the permitted number of resits in case of failure is limited to 2 only.

The low passing rates are often criticized, however, the fiscal authorities and the Chamber of Tax Advisers defend their practice with high quality standards.

=== Subjects ===
Subjects of the Steuerberaterprüfung are according to § 37 para 3 StBerG.:

- Tax Procedural Law (including criminal law for tax offences);
- Taxes on income and capital, notably individual income tax, corporation tax, business tax ("Gewerbesteuer");
- Fiscal valuation law, inheritance tax and property tax;
- VAT, registration duties, fundamentals of customs legislation;
- Commercial law as well as fundamentals of civil law, company law, the bankruptcy law and the law of the European Union;
- General Management and Business Administration;
- Bookkeeping and Accounting;
- Economics;
- Professional law.

=== Conditions to sit in ===
Conditions to sit in on the Steuerberaterprüfung are:

1. A regular university or university of applied sciences education in business management, economics or jurisprudence finished with a relevant degree;
2. followed by practical work in the field of taxes administered by German Federal Republic or the German state authorities.

The practical engagement must have been pursued over a period of at least 3 years when the normal period of university education is less than four years, otherwise for a period of at least 2 years.

Alternatively, admission to the Steuerberaterprüfung may be possible

- for applicants who have completed vocational training in a commercial occupation, or hold an equivalent qualification, must subsequently complete 8 years of practical work in taxes administered by the German federal or state tax authorities. This requirement is reduced to 6 years for applicants who have passed the examination as a geprüfter Bilanzbuchhalter or Steuerfachwirt.
- for current or former tax-administration officials in the gehobener Dienst (upper intermediate civil service), or comparable employees, with at least six years of practical experience in that administration as a case officer or in an equivalent or higher position.

=== Exam process ===
The written part of the Steuerberaterprüfung consists of 3 exams on 3 consecutive days (Tuesday to Thursday) with a length of 6 hours each. By passing with an overall average grade of 4.5 or better - where 1 is the highest and 6 the lowest mark - the examinee is accredited to the oral exam usually taking place in the first months of the following year. With a combined overall average grade of 4.15 or better the exam is passed.

Some years ago, each federal state ("Bundesland") had its own exam with some of them unofficially offering easier versions. This has been revised in that the exams are all to be taken on the same dates with the same content.

== Practice ==
Besides business advisory and accounting the main function for a Steuerberater is the tax advisory (esp. tax planning, tax compliance and tax litigation in German fiscal courts). The latter is a restricted work which only few professionals may perform (Vorbehaltsaufgabe).

Since the day of establishment Steuerberater is renowned as very well reputed license, not least because of the strict professional duties (Berufspflichten) which discriminate the Steuerberater from common business advisors. According to these strict professional duties, Steuerberater are inter alia restricted from performing any commercial activity ("gewerbliche Tätigkeit") while practicing as a licensed tax advisor.

== Professional organisation and regulations ==
Steuerberater may only work self-employed, in an association with other Steuerberatern or certain other professionals (e.g. attorneys-at-law) or as employees of the aforementioned. The only exception is the Syndikus-Steuerberater who is employed in a regular company but must be allowed to decide and work according to the law and his professional duties and independent of the employer's orders in this respect.

The competent regional chamber of tax advisers (Steuerberaterkammer) appoints Steuerberater. The profession is governed by the Tax Advisory Act (Steuerberatungsgesetz), its implementing ordinance, the professional code of conduct (Berufsordnung der Bundessteuerberaterkammer), and the Tax Advisers’ Remuneration Ordinance (Steuerberatervergütungsverordnung).

== See also ==
- Tax return in Germany
