= 100 Black Men of America =

U.S. civic organization

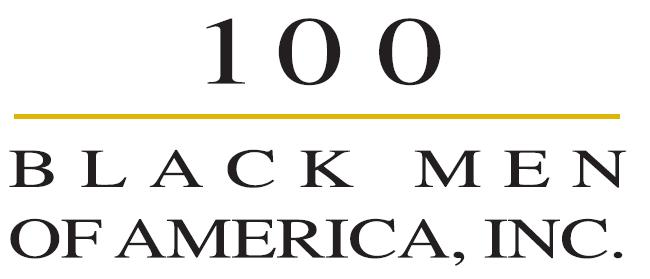
- Formation: 1963
- Type: Service club
- Headquarters: 141 Auburn Avenue NE; Atlanta, Georgia
- Members: 10,000+
- Website: 100blackmen.org

100 Black Men of America is a men's civic organization and service club that works in the field of education and empowerment of African-American children and teens. As of 2009, the organization has 110 chapters and more than 10,000 members in different cities in the United States and throughout the world. The members are predominantly African-American professionals, businessmen, civic leaders and administrators, educators, and other occupations.

The stated mission of 100 Black Men of America, Inc. is to improve the quality of life within African American communities by enhancing educational and economic opportunities.

== History ==
The initial idea for 100 Black Men of America was conceived in New York in 1963 by a group of African American professionals who wanted to improve the quality of life and economic opportunities for the black community by fostering better education and youth development. Elements of the organization's creed that dated from this era (e.g. no member shall be without transportation, no member shall be without legal representation, etc.) provide some insight into the challenges faced by many African American organizations during the height of the Civil Rights Movement in the early 1960s. Some of the early members were David Dinkins, J. Bruce Llewellyn and Jackie Robinson.

By 1976, a separate chapter was formed in New Jersey, and before 1987, other chapters formed in most major U.S. cities. Between 1983 and 1986, these chapters held several national conferences with the aim of forming a more official national organization. On May 27, 1987, 100 Black Men of America, Inc. held its first national conference in Atlanta, Georgia, with businessman Nathaniel Goldstein as its first president and chairman of the board.

In 1994, the organization established the Collegiate 100 as an auxiliary to its chapters throughout the nation. The Collegiate 100 is composed of only young men actively enrolled in college. The Collegiate 100 members provide support for the chapters as well as receive mentoring from chapter members.

In 2010, the organization established an auxiliary for young professional men known as the Emerging 100. The Emerging 100 focuses on the recruitment and engagement of men between the ages of 22 and 35. Atlanta is the first city to establish an Emerging 100 auxiliary and Houston is the second.

== Some notable developments ==
In 2015, the 100 Black Men of America became an active partner of the Celebration Bowl held in Atlanta, GA.

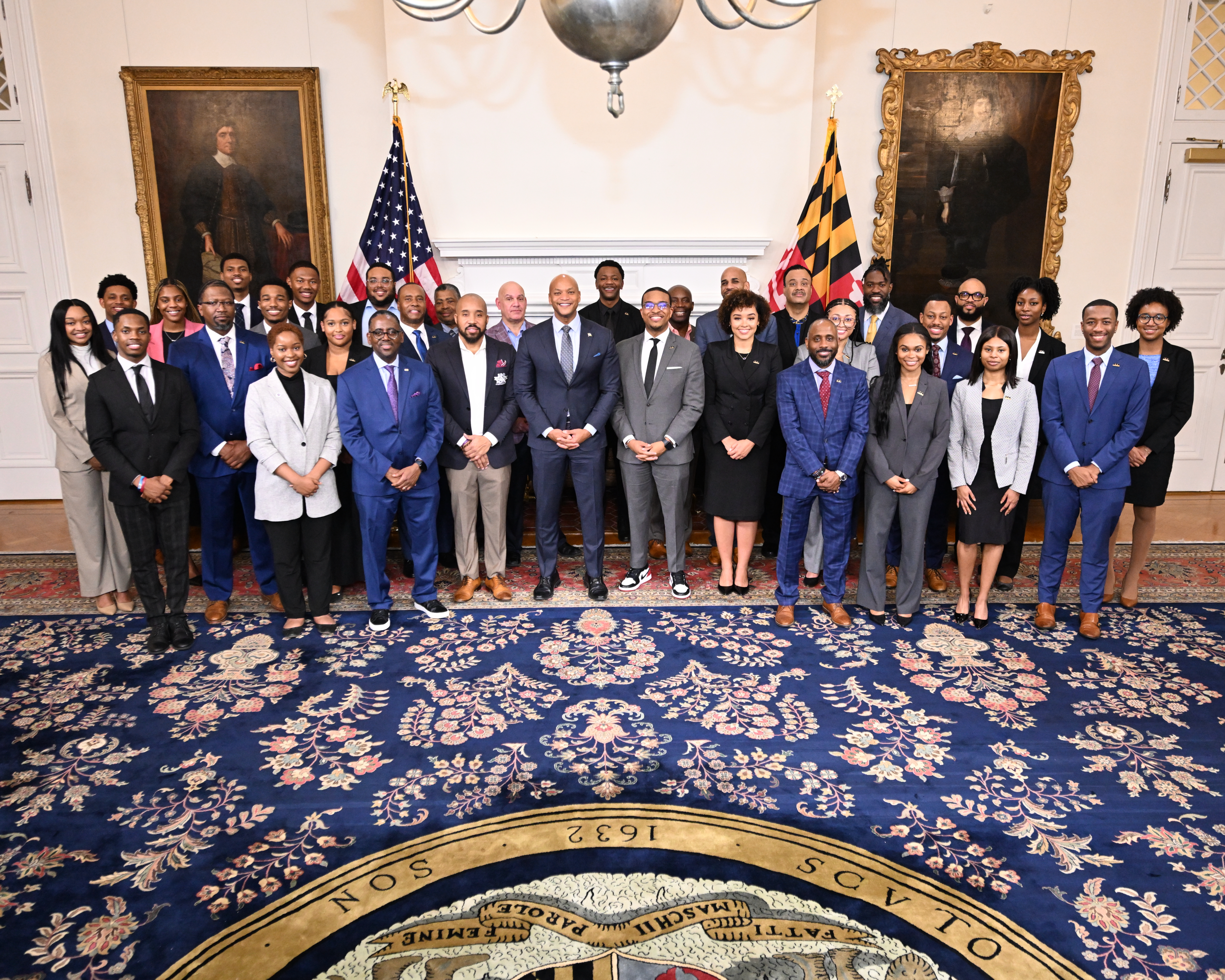
Maryland Governor Wes Moore hosts 100 Black Men in February 2024.

In 2009, several leaders of the organization were interviewed by CNN’s T.J. Holmes to discuss their views on President Barack Obama’s first 100 days as US president. 100 Black Men's Health and Wellness programs were the subject of a news story feature by CNN's Dr. Sanjay Gupta About how former Surgeon General David Satcher is leading a charge to promote healthy eating among African American youth. CNN also featured a video article on 100 Black Men of Atlanta's youth “Robotics Team” that is competing on a national and international level.

According to an August 27, 2007, article in the Pittsburgh Post-Gazette, 100 Black Men of Western Pennsylvania teamed up with Carnegie Mellon University to provide a 14-week summer program for teenagers to learn about computer science. During the program, which was free to participants, the teenagers learned the basics of computer science, information technology, and the World Wide Web. This is the seventh summer that this program has taken place.

In 2001, the 100 Black Men of Long Island Development Group purchased a former bus terminal in Hempstead. The organization proposed converting the building into affordable housing, and housing for people with disabilities. Questions about the organization's ability to fund such a project were raised and continued for several years before being resolved in 2016 by a sale of the building.

According to a May 24, 2004, article in the San Francisco Chronicle, the Bay Area (San Francisco) chapter signed a pledge not to accept funding from tobacco companies.

== Partial list of prominent members ==
- Cyril deGrasse Tyson (deceased - founding member)

== See also ==
- Extra Mile Education Foundation
- Marva Collins
- National Coalition of 100 Black Women
