= Fuels America =

Fuels America is a coalition of organizations working in support of the Renewable Fuel Standard. The website of the group states their purpose as "promoting the benefits of all types of renewable fuel already growing in America.

== Overview ==
Fuels America was announced in 2012 during a conference call of the Biotechnology Industry Organization (BIO).

Examples of the efforts of Fuels America include an ad campaign launched in July 2013, with a focus on choice in energy. The ad campaign was "targeted to policymakers in Washington DC and focused on supporting the Renewable Fuel Standard." Concurrent activities also included testifying in front of the United States Congress, such as testimony given by Bob Dinneen in July 2013 to a subcommittee for the United States House Committee on Energy and Commerce.

In late 2015, Fuels America conducted an advertising campaign to support the Renewable Fuel Standard. The campaign included a full-page advertisement in the New York Times and online ads targeted at the Washington, DC area.
