= David I. Shapiro =

American lawyer and activist (1928–2009)

- Born: David Israel Shapiro; June 17, 1928; New York City, U.S.
- Died: October 1, 2009 (aged 81); London, England
- Education: University of Wisconsin–Madison; Brooklyn College (LLB)
- Occupations: Attorney; activist

David Israel Shapiro (June 17, 1928 – October 1, 2009) was an American 1st Amendment attorney and civil liberties activist, known best in the United States for his key roles defending people against accusations by the House Committee on Un-American Activities, his representation of the American Nazi Party in a free speech case, and his pioneering of class action lawsuits.

== Early life and education ==
Born in 1928 in Brooklyn, New York, Shapiro studied at the University of Wisconsin–Madison and Brooklyn College. He served from 1944 to 1946 in the United States Navy during World War II. Accepted to the New York Bar in 1949, he distinguished himself after becoming one of the youngest attorneys to join the Supreme Court Bar in 1955.

== Legal career ==
In 1956, Shapiro represented Kendrick Cole in front of the Supreme Court, leading to a decision undermining the Loyalty-Security program. In the 1960s, Shapiro led opposition to several Hollywood companies that refused to employ people who had refused to cooperate with the House Committee on Un-American Activities, aiming to show that they were in restraint of trade.

In February 1960, Shapiro was asked to represent American Nazi Party leader George Lincoln Rockwell by the American Civil Liberties Union, to which he reportedly replied "My middle name’s Israel. I’m not going to represent this son of a bitch." Regardless of his initial reaction, Shapiro took the case, getting Rockwell's case dismissed in roughly twenty minutes. After the hearing, Rockwell reportedly told Shapiro: "Listen up, Jewboy, just because you got me off, that doesn’t do anything for you. Make sure you understand that I’ll watch as you and all the other Jews go to the gas chamber." Shapiro's family would endure harassment from Jewish protesters for months afterward.

Shapiro argued the case of Silver v. New York Stock Exchange in 1963 before the Supreme Court, representing a securities dealer who had been excluded from wire connections because of grounds that he was disloyal. The Court upheld the right of the dealer to challenge his exclusion.

In 1973, Shapiro led the defense of former Richard Nixon White House Counsel Charles Colson, a friend and law partner. Regardless, Colson was convicted, and sentenced to 1–3 years in prison.

Throughout the 1980s, Shapiro took a leading role in developing techniques for multi-client class action lawsuits. He was one of a group of attorneys who filed a class action lawsuit representing Vietnam veterans against the makers of Agent Orange, a herbicide later shown to cause cancer and birth defects. At the time, the case was the largest class-action suit ever filed. Affected veterans and families settled for $180 million in the form of a trust fund.

== Later life and death ==
Throughout the late 1980s and 1990s, Shapiro began to focus more on mediation. In 1989, he was appointed by courts overseeing the bankruptcy of Eastern Airlines to mediate negotiations between the airline and its unions. In 1996, Shapiro emigrated to London. He is credited in England as a leading mediator, and was said to have encouraged young lawyers to "press the Outrage Button." When asked why he continued to practice law into his 80s, he would reportedly say: "Because I give a damn." On October 1, 2009, Shapiro died of cardiac arrest in London. He had been making plans to return to his law firm in the US, Dickstein Shapiro.
