= Small Business Development Corporation =

Australian independent statutory authority

The Small Business Development Corporation (SBDC) is an independent statutory authority, established in 1984 under the Small Business Development Corporation Act 1983 by the Government of Western Australia.

The primary role of the SBDC is to encourage, promote, facilitate and assist the establishment, growth and development of small business in Western Australia. This is achieved by providing education and skill development programs, and advice and guidance to small business owners on the establishment, development and expansion of their businesses.

The SBDC communicates with the small business sector directly as well as liaising with industry and business associations to exchange information and provide support and assistance to their members. The SBDC also provides advice and support to Western Australia's Minister for Small Business on matters impacting the sector, including the effect of government policy and legislation on small business. Through these avenues, the SBDC helps to raise public awareness of the importance of small business to the economy and the community.

In addition, the SBDC investigates any matters impacting small businesses, and advises small business on the means of obtaining financial assistance. The SBDC also maintains an information centre and provides business workshops for small business operators, existing and potential.

The current Minister for Small Business in Western Australia is Jackie Jarvis (https://www.wa.gov.au/government/premier-and-cabinet-ministers/jackie-jarvis) in the McGowan Ministry.
