= Russo-Ukrainian war (2022–present) =

Phase since 2022 of war ongoing since 2014

- Part of the Russo-Ukrainian war
- Map of Ukraine as of 24 April 2026 (details): Continuously controlled by Ukraine Currently occupied or controlled by Russia Formerly occupied by Russia
Date	24 February 2022 – present (4 years, 8 months, 3 weeks and 3 days)
Location	Ukraine, Russia, Black Sea
Status	Ongoing (list of engagements · territorial control · timeline of events)

Belligerents
Russia; Belarus (Note: Belarus's logistical support for Russian forces, particularly allowing Russian forces to launch offensive operations against Ukraine from Belarusian territory in 2022, has been characterised as belligerency on the part of Belarus in this conflict by numerous analysts, including those published by the ISW, the IISS, and OSW.); North Korea	Ukraine

Commanders and leaders
Vladimir Putin; Valery Gerasimov; Sergei Shoigu; Andrey Belousov	Volodymyr Zelenskyy; Mykhailo Drapatyi; Oleksandr Syrskyi; Valerii Zaluzhnyi

Units involved
Order of battle	Order of battle

Strength
Pre-invasion at border: 169,000–190,000 (Note: Including military, paramilitary, and 34,000 separatist militias.); Pre-invasion total: 900,000 military 554,000 paramilitary In February 2023: 300,000+ active personnel in Ukraine; In June 2024: 700,000 active personnel in the area	Pre-invasion total: 196,600 military 102,000 paramilitary July 2022 total: up to 700,000; September 2023 total: over 800,000

Casualties and losses
- Reports vary widely, see § Casualties for details

On 24 February 2022, Russia invaded Ukraine, starting the largest and deadliest war in Europe since World War II, in a major escalation of the existing war between the two countries that began when Russia attacked Ukraine in 2014. The fighting has caused hundreds of thousands of military casualties and tens of thousands of Ukrainian civilian casualties. Russian troops occupy roughly 20% of Ukraine. From a population of 41 million, about 8 million Ukrainians have been internally displaced and 6–7 million have fled the country, creating Europe's largest refugee crisis since World War II.

In late 2021, Russia massed troops near Ukraine's borders and issued demands to the West, including a ban on Ukraine ever joining NATO. After repeatedly denying having plans to attack Ukraine, on 24 February 2022, Russian president Vladimir Putin announced a "special military operation" to support the Russian-backed breakaway republics of Donetsk and Luhansk, whose paramilitary forces had been fighting Ukraine in the Donbas war since 2014. Putin espoused irredentist and imperialist views challenging Ukraine's legitimacy as a state. He claimed without evidence that the Ukrainian government were neo-Nazis committing genocide against the Russian minority in the Donbas and that Russia's goal was to "demilitarise and denazify" Ukraine. (Note: Attributed to multiple references:) Russian air strikes and a ground invasion were launched on a northern front from Belarus towards the capital, Kyiv; a southern front from occupied Crimea; and an eastern front from the Donbas towards Kharkiv. Ukraine enacted martial law, ordered a general mobilisation, and severed diplomatic relations with Russia.

Russian troops retreated from the north and the outskirts of Kyiv by April 2022, after encountering stiff resistance and logistical challenges. The Bucha massacre was uncovered after their withdrawal. Russia launched an offensive in the Donbas and captured Mariupol after a destructive siege. Russia continued to bomb military and civilian targets far from the front and struck Ukraine's energy grid during winter months. In late 2022, Ukraine launched successful counteroffensives in the south and east, liberating most of Kharkiv Oblast. Soon after, Russia illegally annexed four partly occupied provinces. In November, Ukraine liberated the city of Kherson and all land west of the Dnipro River. After small but steady Russian advances in the east in the first half of 2024, Ukraine launched a cross-border offensive into Russia's Kursk Oblast in August, where North Korean soldiers were sent to help Russia.

The United Nations Human Rights Office reports that Russia is committing severe human rights violations in occupied Ukraine. Russia's attacks on civilians, as well as its policies in occupied territories, have led to allegations of genocide. (Note: Attributed to multiple references:) The direct cost of the war for Russia has been estimated as over US$450 billion, while the World Bank Group estimates the cost of reconstruction in Ukraine at US$588 billion.

The Russian invasion was met with international condemnation. Many countries imposed sanctions on Russia and its ally Belarus while providing humanitarian and military aid to Ukraine. Protests occurred around the world. Within its borders, Russia met anti-war protesters with mass arrests and greater media censorship. War-related disruption to Ukrainian agriculture and shipping worsened the world food crisis; war-related environmental damage was described as ecocide. The International Criminal Court (ICC) opened an investigation into crimes against humanity, war crimes, abduction of Ukrainian children, and genocide against Ukrainians. The ICC issued arrest warrants for Putin and five other Russian officials. Peace negotiations have stalled, and Russia has repeatedly refused calls for a ceasefire.

== Background ==
=== Post-Soviet relations ===
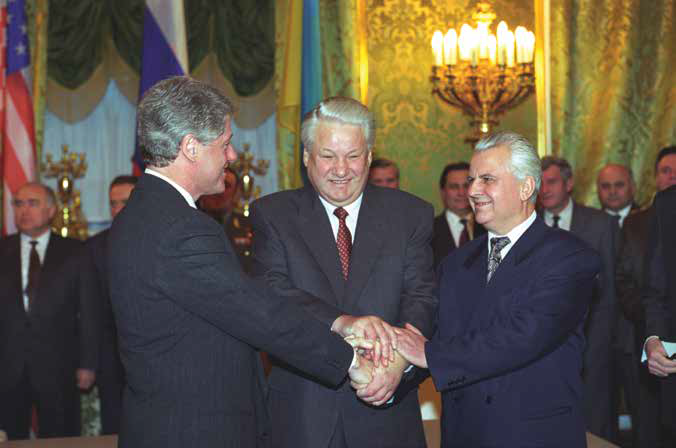
US president Clinton, Russian president Yeltsin, and Ukrainian president Kravchuk after signing the Trilateral Statement (1994). Russia and the US agreed to uphold Ukraine's independence and territorial integrity in return for Ukraine giving up its nuclear weapons.

After the dissolution of the Soviet Union in 1991, Russia and Ukraine maintained cordial relations. In return for security guarantees, Ukraine signed the Nuclear Non-Proliferation Treaty in 1994 and gave up its nuclear weapons. Russia, the US, and the UK agreed in the Budapest Memorandum to respect Ukraine's sovereignty and borders. In 1999, Russia signed the Charter for European Security, affirming that every country had the right "to choose or change its security arrangements" and to join military alliances. In 2005, Putin said that if Ukraine wanted to join NATO, "we will respect their choice".

=== Ukrainian revolution ===
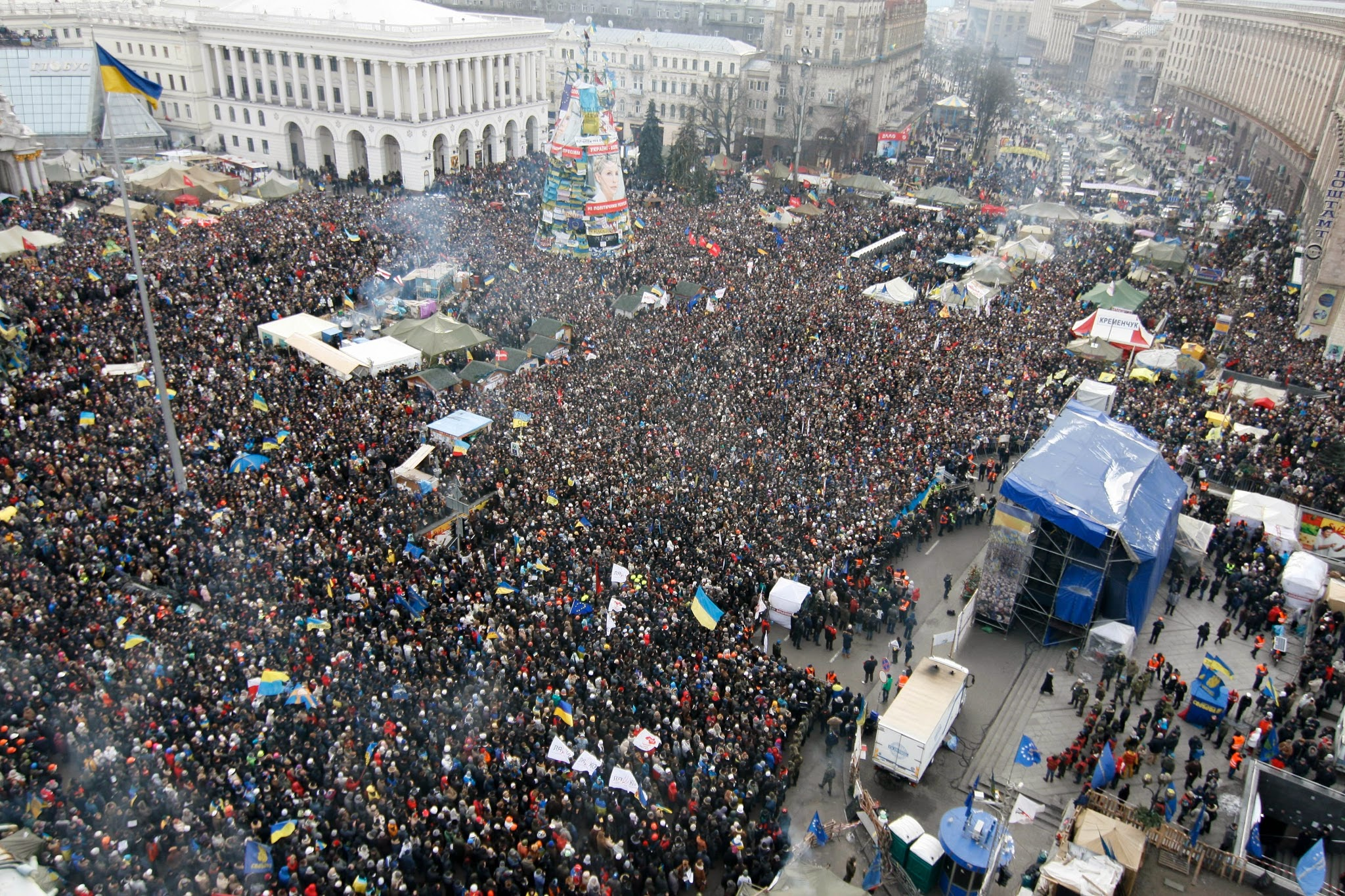
Protesters at a rally on Independence Square, 19 January 2014

In 2013, Ukraine's parliament approved finalising the European Union–Ukraine Association Agreement. The Putin regime put pressure on Ukraine to reject the agreement and imposed economic sanctions on the country. Kremlin adviser Sergei Glazyev warned in September 2013 that if Ukraine signed the EU agreement, Russia would no longer acknowledge Ukraine's borders.

In November, Ukrainian president Viktor Yanukovych suddenly withdrew from signing the agreement, choosing closer ties to Russia instead. This coerced withdrawal sparked massive protests known as Euromaidan, culminating in the Revolution of Dignity in February 2014. Almost 100 protesters were killed by state forces. Despite signing an agreement, Yanukovych secretly fled to Russia. Ukraine's parliament voted to remove him and hold new elections, which elected Petro Poroshenko as President.

=== Russian invasion of Crimea and Donbas ===
Map of Russian-controlled territory in Ukraine, September 2014

On 27 February 2014, Russian soldiers with no insignia began to occupy the Ukrainian territory of Crimea, blockading Ukrainian military bases. In March, Russia annexed Crimea following an illegitimate referendum held under occupation. It was the first time since World War II that a European country had annexed part of another, and several scholars likened it to Nazi Germany's annexation of Austria. The UN General Assembly adopted a resolution affirming the "territorial integrity of Ukraine" and rejecting the annexation. NATO also suspended cooperation with Russia. Putin said Crimea should never have been part of an independent Ukraine and claimed that Russia did not want to take any other regions of Ukraine.

Pro-Russian protests followed in the Ukrainian cities of Donetsk and Luhansk, covertly funded and organised by Russia. In April 2014, armed Russian paramilitaries seized Sloviansk and other settlements, proclaiming the independent Donetsk People's Republic (DPR) and Luhansk People's Republic (LPR). Their commander, Igor Girkin, acknowledged that this sparked the War in Donbas, as Ukraine soon launched an operation to retake the territory. Russia covertly supported the separatists with troops, tanks and artillery. The International Criminal Court judged that the war was a national and international armed conflict involving Russia, and the European Court of Human Rights judged that Russia controlled the DPR and LPR from 2014 onward. Ukraine's parliament declared the Donbas region to be occupied by Russia.

The annexation of Crimea and the Donbas war sparked a wave of Russian nationalism. Analyst Vladimir Socor called Putin's 2014 speech following the annexation a "manifesto of Greater Russia irredentism". Putin began referring to "Novorossiya" (New Russia), a former Russian imperial territory that covered much of southern Ukraine. Russian-backed forces were influenced by Russian neo-imperialism and sought to create a new Novorossiya.

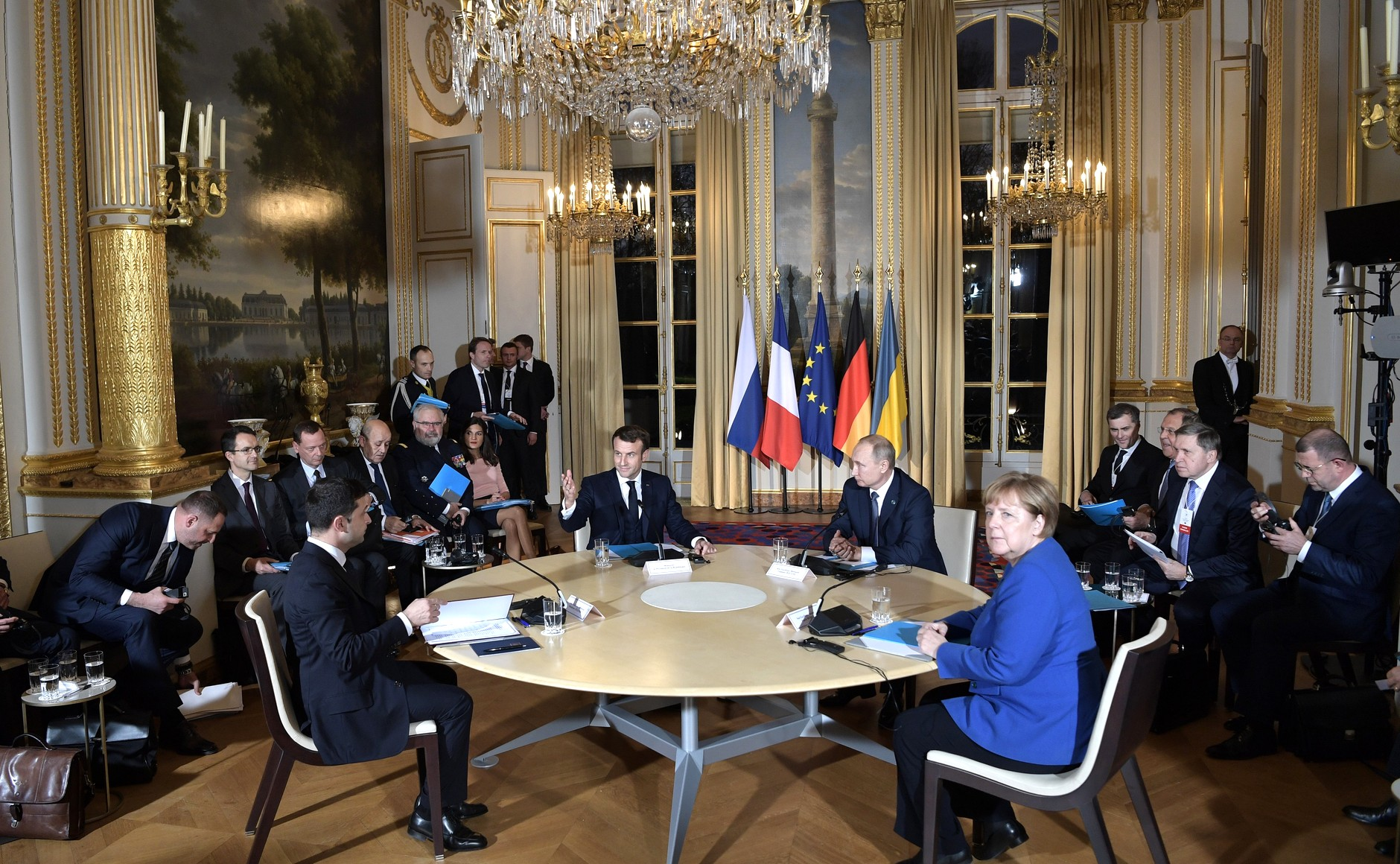
The Normandy Format meeting in December 2019 was the only meeting between Zelenskyy and Putin.

When the conflict began in 2014, Ukraine was officially neutral and said it was not seeking NATO membership. Following Russia's occupation of Crimea and invasion of the Donbas, Ukraine's parliament voted in December 2014 to revoke the country's neutral status and seek NATO membership.

The Minsk agreements (September 2014 and February 2015) aimed to resolve the Donbas War, but ceasefires and further negotiations failed. The West's weak response to Russian actions led Putin to believe the West would not react strongly to the 2022 invasion. Several political scientists said this encouraged further Russian aggression.

== Prelude ==
=== Russian military buildup and demands ===
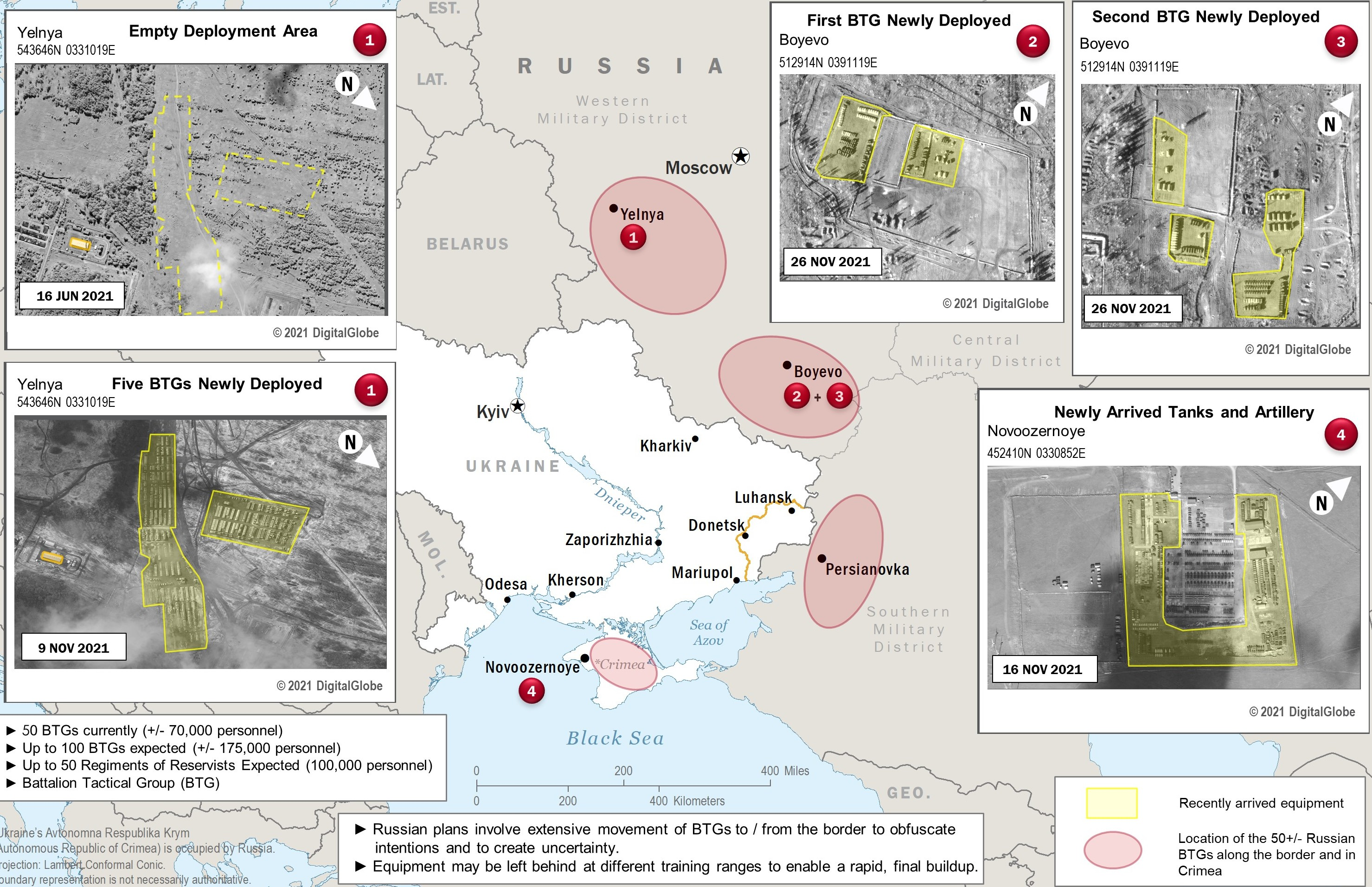
Russian military build-up around Ukraine as of 3 December 2021

There was a Russian military build-up near Ukraine's borders in March and April 2021, and again in both Russia and Belarus from October 2021 onward. Russia said it was only holding military exercises. Members of its government, including Putin, repeatedly denied having plans to invade Ukraine, issuing denials up until the day before the invasion.

Russia's proxy forces launched thousands of attacks on Ukrainian troops in the Donbas. Observers from the Organization for Security and Co-operation in Europe (OSCE) reported more than 90,000 ceasefire violations throughout 2021, most in Russian-controlled territory.

In July 2021, Putin published "On the Historical Unity of Russians and Ukrainians," in which he called Ukraine "historically Russian lands" and claimed there is "no historical basis" for the "idea of Ukrainian people as a nation separate from the Russians." Putin was accused of promoting Russian imperialism, historical revisionism, and disinformation.

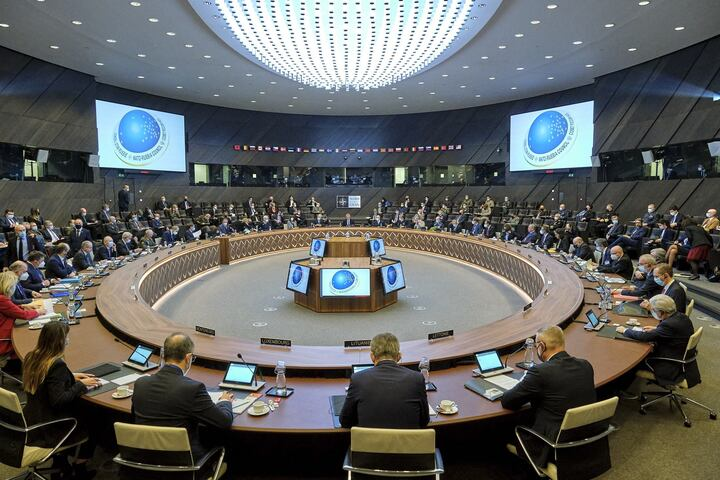
Meeting of the NATO-Russia Council on 12 January 2022

The December 2021 Russian ultimatum to NATO included demands that NATO end all activity in its Eastern European member states and ban Ukraine or any former Soviet state from ever joining the alliance. Russia's government said NATO was a threat and warned of a military response if it followed an "aggressive line". A US official said the US was willing to discuss the proposals, but there were some that "the Russians know are unacceptable" and had already been ruled out. NATO Secretary General Jens Stoltenberg replied that "Russia has no veto" on whether Ukraine joins and "has no right to establish a sphere of influence to try to control their neighbours." NATO underlined that it is a defensive alliance and had co-operated with Russia until the Crimea annexation.

Several Western political analysts suggested that Russia knew its "unrealistic demands" would be rejected, giving it a pretext to invade. No countries bordering Russia had joined NATO since 2004. Ukraine had not yet applied, and some NATO states would likely veto its membership. Analysts Taras Kuzio and Vladimir Socor agree that "when Russia made its decision to invade Ukraine, that country was more remote than ever not only from NATO membership but also from any track that might lead to membership." Political scientists Michael McFaul and Robert Person said Russia's occupation of Crimea and the Donbas had already blocked Ukraine's NATO membership; they suggested Putin's real aim was to subjugate Ukraine.

NATO offered to negotiate some of Russia's demands and to improve military transparency, as long as Russia stopped its troop buildup. The alliance rejected Russia's demand to keep Ukraine out of NATO forever, pointing out that Russia had signed agreements affirming the right of Ukraine and other countries to join alliances. The US proposed that it and Russia sign an agreement not to station missiles or troops in Ukraine. Putin replied that Russia's demands had been "ignored," and the Russian troop buildup continued.

Western leaders vowed heavy sanctions should Putin invade rather than negotiate. French president Emmanuel Macron and German chancellor Olaf Scholz met Putin in February 2022 to dissuade him from invading. Putin told Scholz that Ukraine should not be an independent state. Zelenskyy said Putin had broken agreements and could not be trusted to respect Ukrainian neutrality. At the Munich Security Conference, Zelenskyy called for Western powers to end their "appeasement" of Putin and give a timeframe for when Ukraine could join NATO.

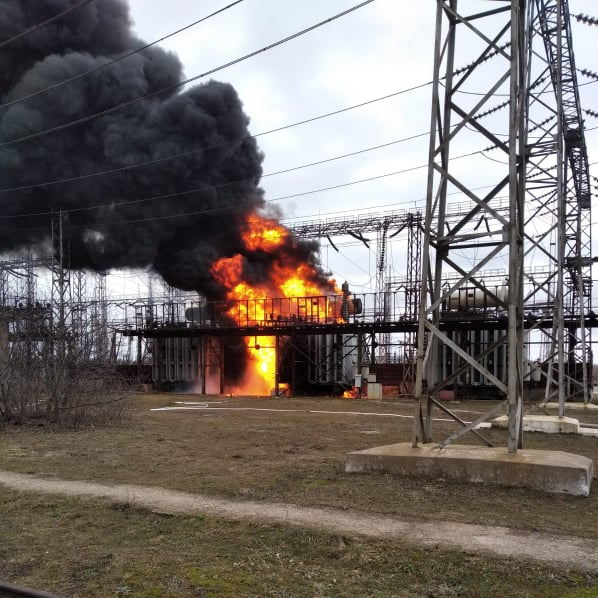
Luhansk power station after being shelled by Russian-backed forces in the Donbas, 22 February 2022

Shortly before the invasion, Russia's proxy forces stepped up attacks on Ukrainian forces and civilians in the Donbas. Separatist leaders warned that Ukraine was about to launch an offensive, but they gave no evidence, and The Guardian noted it would be "exceedingly risky" for Ukraine to assault the Donbas while Russian troops were massed on its borders. Ukraine and Western leaders accused Russia of staging false-flag attacks and trying to provoke retaliation to give Russia a pretext for invading. On 17 February, Russian proxy forces shelled a kindergarten in Ukrainian-held territory, then blamed it on Ukraine. Zelenskyy said his military would not respond to the provocations.

=== Invasion plans ===
The Royal United Services Institute reported that Russia's plan involved defeating Ukraine within ten days and capturing or killing its government, followed by "mopping up" operations; establishing filtration camps for Ukrainians; setting up occupation regimes; executing people involved in the Revolution of Dignity; and annexation. The decision to invade was reportedly made by Putin and a small group of war hawks or siloviki in Putin's inner circle, including national security adviser Nikolai Patrushev and defence minister Sergei Shoigu.

After the invasion began, Ukrainian and Western analysts assessed that Putin seemed to have believed the Russian military could seize Kyiv within days. This assessment led to the conclusion that "taking Kyiv in three days" had been the original goal of the invasion.

==== Putin's invasion announcement ====
Putin's address to the nation on 24 February 2022. Minutes after Putin's announcement, the invasion began.

On 21 February, Putin announced the formal recognition of the independence of the Donetsk People's Republic and Luhansk People's Republic by Russia. The following day, Russia announced that it was sending troops into the territories as "peacekeepers", and the Federation Council of Russia authorised the use of military force abroad.

Before 5 a.m. Kyiv time on 24 February, Putin, in another speech, announced a "special military operation," which effectively declared war on Ukraine. Putin said the operation was to "protect the people" of the Russian-controlled breakaway republics. He baselessly claimed that Russians in the Donbas had "been facing humiliation and genocide perpetrated by the Kyiv regime" for 8 years. Putin said Russia was being threatened: he baselessly claimed that Ukrainian officials were neo-Nazis under Western control, that Ukraine was developing nuclear weapons, and that a hostile NATO was building up its forces and infrastructure in Ukraine. He said Russia sought the "demilitarisation and denazification" of Ukraine and denied the legitimacy of the Ukrainian state. Putin said he had no plans to occupy Ukraine. The invasion began within minutes of Putin's speech.

== Events ==
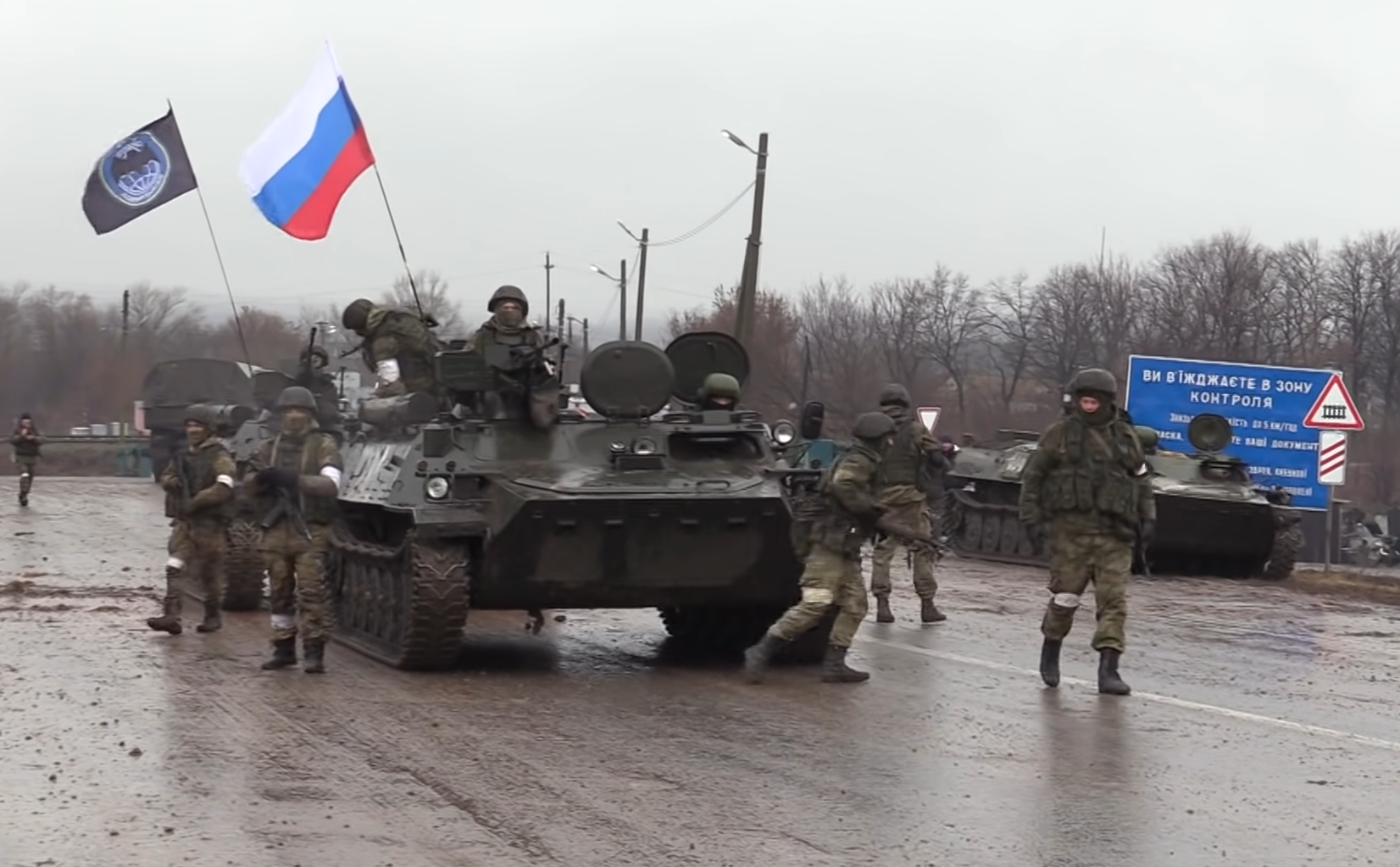
Russian troops in Ukraine early in the 2022 invasion

The invasion began at dawn on 24 February. It was the biggest attack on a European country and the first full-scale war in Europe since World War II. Russia launched a simultaneous ground and air attack. Missiles struck targets throughout Ukraine, and Russian troops invaded from the north, east, and south. Russia did not officially declare war. Immediately after the invasion began, Zelenskyy declared martial law in Ukraine in a video speech. The same evening, he ordered a general mobilisation of all Ukrainian males aged 18–60, prohibiting them from leaving the country.

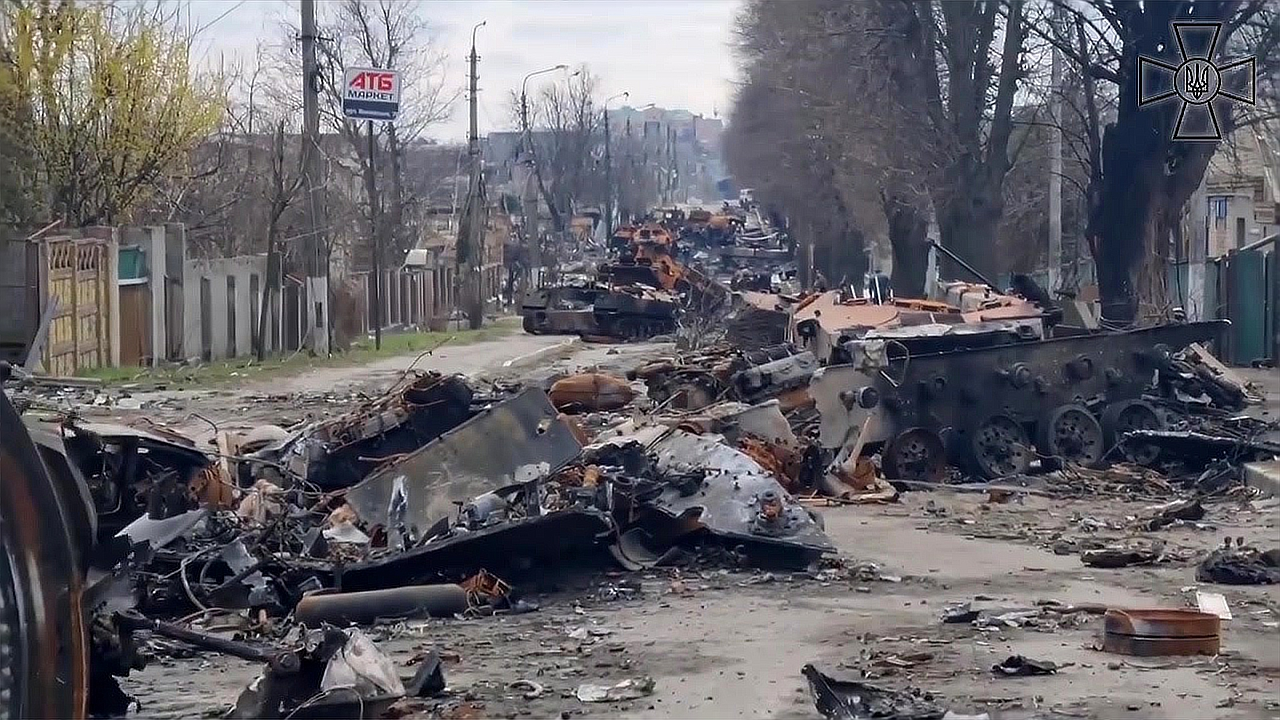
Wreckage of a destroyed Russian column on 27 February in Bucha

The first stage of the invasion was conducted on four fronts: one towards western Kyiv from Belarus by the Russian Eastern Military District; one deployed towards eastern Kyiv by the Central Military District (northeastern front), comprising the 41st Combined Arms Army and the 2nd Guards Combined Arms Army, one deployed towards Kharkiv; and a fourth, southern front originating in Crimea and Russia's Rostov oblast with an eastern axis towards Odesa and a western area of operations toward Mariupol. The invasion was unexpectedly met by fierce resistance. Russia failed to take Kyiv and was repulsed in the battles of Irpin, Hostomel, and Bucha. The Russians tried to encircle the capital, but defenders under Oleksandr Syrskyi held their ground, using anti-tank and anti-aircraft missiles to thin Russian supply lines and stall the offensive.

By 7 April, Russian troops deployed to the northern front pulled back to resupply and redeploy to the Donbas. The northeastern front was similarly withdrawn for redeployment to southeastern Ukraine. On 26 April, delegates from the US and 40 allied nations met in Germany to discuss a coalition to provide economic support, military supplies, and refitting to Ukraine.

=== Initial invasion (24 February – 7 April 2022) ===
Animated map of the Russian invasion from 24 February to 7 April 2022

The invasion began on 24 February, launched out of Belarus to target Kyiv and from the northeast against the city of Kharkiv. The southeastern front was conducted as two separate spearheads, from Crimea and the southeast against Luhansk and Donetsk.

==== Kyiv and northern front ====
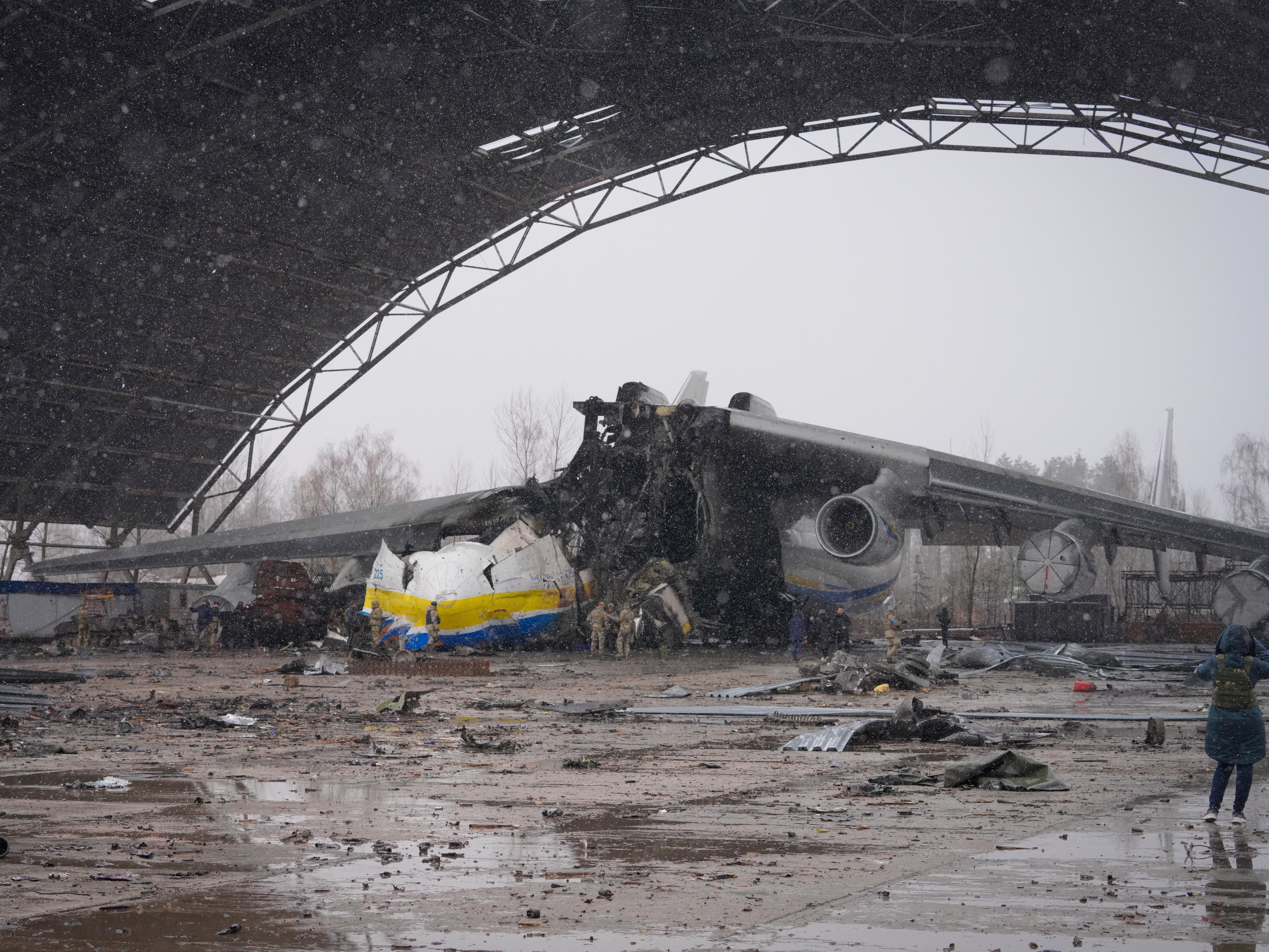
The Antonov An-225 Mriya, the largest aircraft ever built, was destroyed during the Battle of Antonov Airport.

Russian troops tried to seize Kyiv quickly with a spearhead on 24 February, from Belarus south along the west bank of the Dnipro River, with Spetsnaz infiltrating into the city, supported by airborne operations and a rapid mechanised advance from the north, but failed. The apparent intent was to encircle the city from the west, supported by two separate axes of attack along the east bank of the Dnipro: the western at Chernihiv and from the east at Sumy. Russian forces advanced into Chernihiv Oblast on 24 February, besieging its administrative capital within four days of fighting. Travelling along highways, Russian forces reached Brovary, an eastern suburb of Kyiv, on 4 March.

The US contacted Zelenskyy and offered to help him flee, lest the Russian army attempt to kidnap or kill him; Zelenskyy responded that "The fight is here; I need ammunition, not a ride." By early March, Russian advances along the west side of the Dnipro were limited by Ukrainian defences. As of 5 March, a Russian convoy, reportedly 64 kilometres (40 mi) long, had made little progress toward Kyiv. Advances from Chernihiv largely halted as a siege began there. Russian forces advanced on Kyiv from the northwest, capturing Bucha, Hostomel and Vorzel by 5 March. By 11 March, the lengthy convoy had largely dispersed and taken cover. On 16 March, Ukrainian forces began a counter-offensive. Unable to achieve a quick victory in Kyiv, Russian forces switched to indiscriminate bombing and siege warfare.

On 25 March, a Ukrainian counteroffensive retook towns to the east and west of Kyiv. Russian troops in the Bucha area retreated north. Ukrainian forces entered the city on 1 April and recaptured the region around Kyiv and uncovered evidence of war crimes in Bucha. The Pentagon confirmed on 6 April that the Russian army had left Chernihiv Oblast; local authorities said Russian troops had left Sumy Oblast. NATO secretary-general Jens Stoltenberg said the Russian "retraction, resupply, and redeployment" of troops from the Kyiv area should be interpreted as an expansion of Putin's plans for concentrating his forces on eastern Ukraine.

==== Southern and eastern front ====
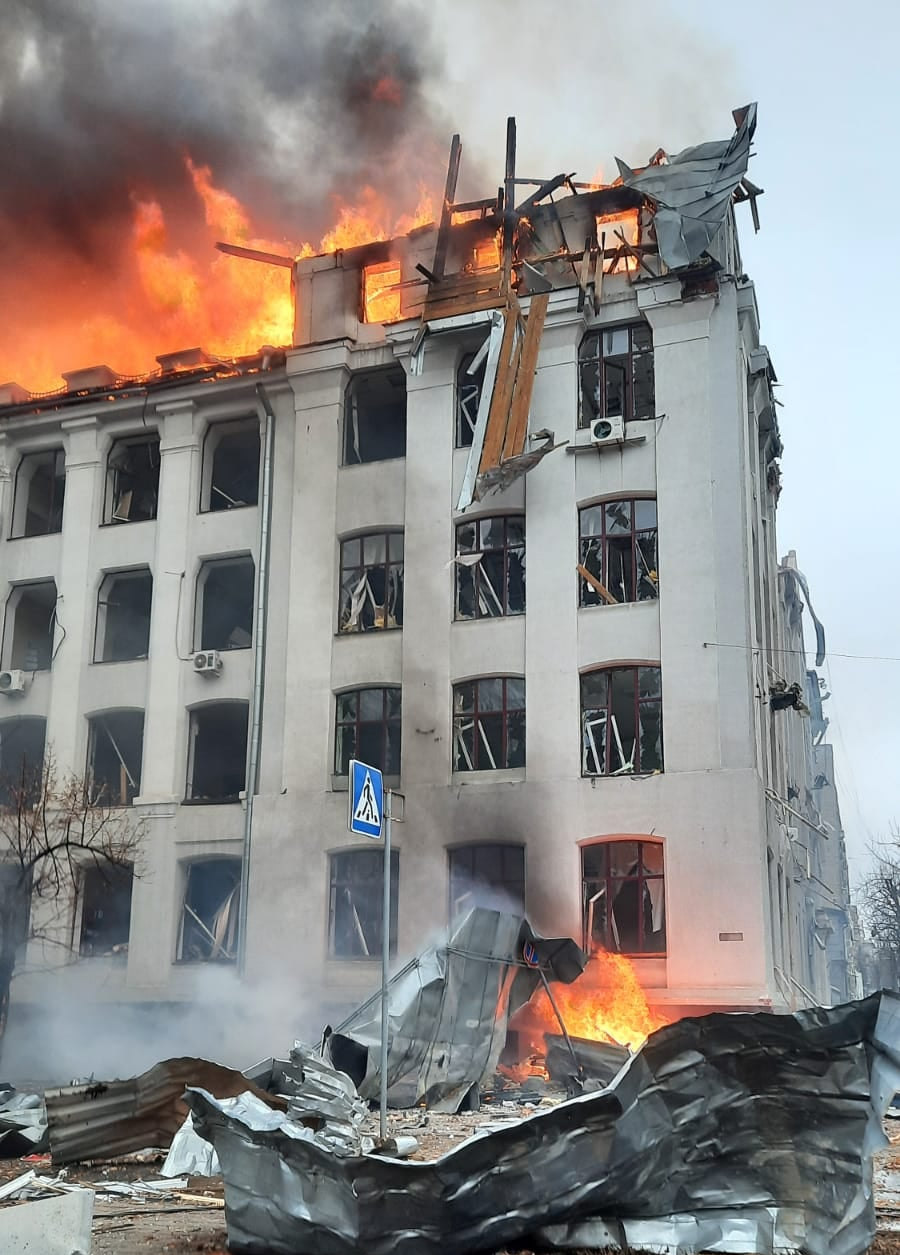
School of Economics of the National University of Kharkiv after Russian bombardment, 2 March 2022

On 24 February, Russian attack groups moved northwest from Crimea, capturing bridges over the Dnieper and the North Crimean Canal. On 1 March, Kherson was the first major city to fall to Russia. Russian troops moved on Mykolaiv and attacked it but were repelled. Russian forces approached the Zaporizhzhia Nuclear Power Plant and besieged Enerhodar. By 25 February, Russian units had begun advancing on Mariupol. Russian forces captured Berdiansk. On 1 March, Denis Pushilin, head of the DPR, announced that it had surrounded Volnovakha.

By 18 March, Mariupol was encircled and fighting had reached the city centre, hampering efforts to evacuate civilians. The Russians demanded surrender, and the Ukrainians refused. On 27 March, Ukrainian deputy prime minister Olha Stefanishyna said that "more than 85 percent of the whole town is destroyed". Russia refused safe passage into Mariupol to 50 buses sent by the UN to evacuate civilians.

In the east, Russian troops attempted to capture Kharkiv and met strong Ukrainian resistance. Izium was captured by Russian forces on 1 April after a monthlong battle. On 25 March, the Russian defence ministry said it would seek to occupy major cities in eastern Ukraine.

On 3 April, following the retreat of Russian forces from Kyiv, Russia expanded its attack on southern Ukraine, with bombardment and strikes against Odesa, Mykolaiv, and the Zaporizhzhia Nuclear Power Plant. By 7 April, the renewed massing of Russian troops and tanks around Izium, Sloviansk, and Kramatorsk prompted Ukrainian officials to advise remaining residents near the eastern border to evacuate to western Ukraine.

=== Southeastern front (8 April – 5 September 2022) ===
Animated map of the Russian invasion from 7 April to 5 September 2022

By 17 April, Russian progress on the southeastern front appeared impeded by Ukrainian forces in the large, heavily fortified Azovstal Iron and Steel Works and surrounding area in Mariupol. On 19 April Russia launched an "eastern assault" across a 480-kilometre (300 mi) front extending from Kharkiv to Donetsk and Luhansk, with simultaneous missile attacks again directed at Kyiv and Lviv. An anonymous US defence official called the Russian offensive "minimal at best".

By 30 May, disparities between Russian and Ukrainian artillery were apparent, with Ukrainian artillery vastly outgunned. In response to Biden's indication that enhanced artillery would be provided to Ukraine, Putin said Russia would expand its invasion to include new cities and ordered a missile strike against Kyiv on 6 June after not directly attacking it for weeks. On 10 June, deputy head of the SBU Vadym Skibitsky stated that during the Sievierodonetsk campaign, the frontlines were where the future of the invasion would be decided:

This is an artillery war now, and we are losing in terms of artillery. Everything now depends on what [the West] gives us. Ukraine has one artillery piece to 10 or 15 Russian artillery pieces. Our western partners have given us about 10% of what they have.

On 29 June, US intelligence director Avril Haines said US agencies agree the invasion will continue "for an extended period of time ... In short, the picture remains pretty grim, and Russia's attitude toward the West is hardening."

The chief spokesman for the Russian Ministry of Defence, Igor Konashenkov, revealed that Russian troops were divided between the army groups "Centre", commanded by Colonel General Aleksander Lapin, and "South", commanded by Army General Sergey Surovikin. On 20 July, Lavrov announced that Russia would respond to the increased military aid being received by Ukraine from abroad by expanding its special military operation to Zaporizhzhia and Kherson oblasts. Russian Ground Forces started recruiting volunteer battalions to create a new 3rd Army Corps within the Western Military District, with a planned strength of 16,000–60,000 personnel. Its units were deployed to the front around the September Kharkiv counteroffensive, in time to join the Russian retreat. The 3rd Army "melted away" according to Forbes, having little impact on the battlefield along with other irregular forces.

==== Fall of Mariupol ====
On 13 April, Russian forces intensified their attack on the Azovstal Iron and Steel Works. Ukrainian prime minister Denys Shmyhal said Ukrainian soldiers had vowed to ignore the ultimatum to surrender and fight to the last. On 20 April, Putin said the siege could be considered tactically complete, since the 500 Ukrainian troops entrenched in bunkers within the ironworks and estimated 1,000 civilians were sealed off from relief.

After meetings with Putin and Zelenskyy, UN secretary-general Guterres on 28 April said he would attempt to organise an evacuation from Azovstal in accordance with assurances from Putin. On 30 April, Russian troops allowed civilians to leave under UN protection. By 3 May, after allowing 100 civilians to depart, Russian troops renewed their bombardment. On 6 May, The Daily Telegraph reported that Russia had used thermobaric bombs against the remaining soldiers. Zelenskyy authorised the commander of the steel factory to surrender as necessary. On 7 May, all civilians were evacuated.

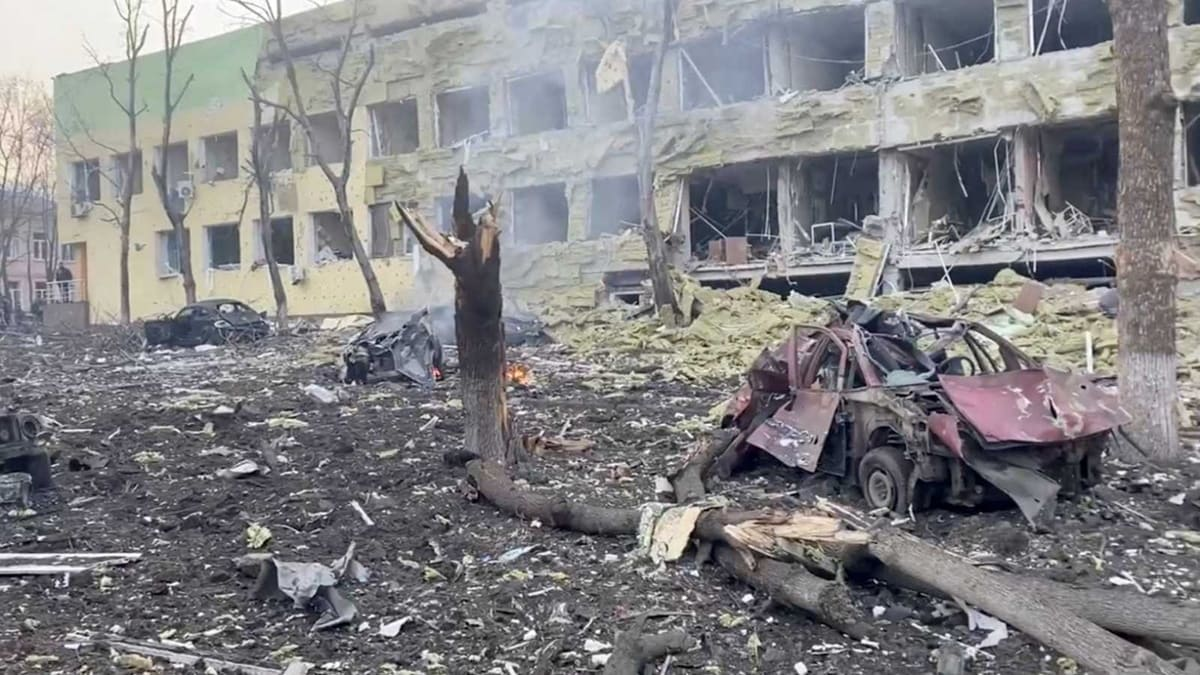
A children's hospital in Mariupol after a Russian airstrike

After the last civilians evacuated, 2,000 Ukrainian soldiers remained barricaded there; 700 were injured. They communicated a plea for a military corridor to evacuate, as they expected execution if they surrendered. Reports of dissent on 8 May indicated that the commander of the Ukrainian marines had made an unauthorised acquisition of tanks, munitions, and personnel, broke out from the position and fled. The remaining soldiers spoke of a weakened defence as a result, which allowed progress to advancing Russian attacks. Ilia Somolienko, deputy commander of the remaining Ukrainian troops, said, "We are basically here, dead men. Most of us know this, and it's why we fight so fearlessly."

On 16 May, the Ukrainian General Staff announced that the Mariupol garrison had "fulfilled its combat mission" and final evacuations had begun. 264 service members were evacuated to Olenivka under Russian control, while 53 who were seriously injured were taken to a hospital in Novoazovsk, controlled by Russia. Following the evacuation, Russian and DPR forces fully controlled Mariupol. Russia press secretary Dmitry Peskov said Putin had guaranteed that the fighters who surrendered would be treated "in accordance with international standards," while Zelenskyy said that "the work of bringing the boys home continues..."

==== Fall of Sievierodonetsk and Lysychansk ====
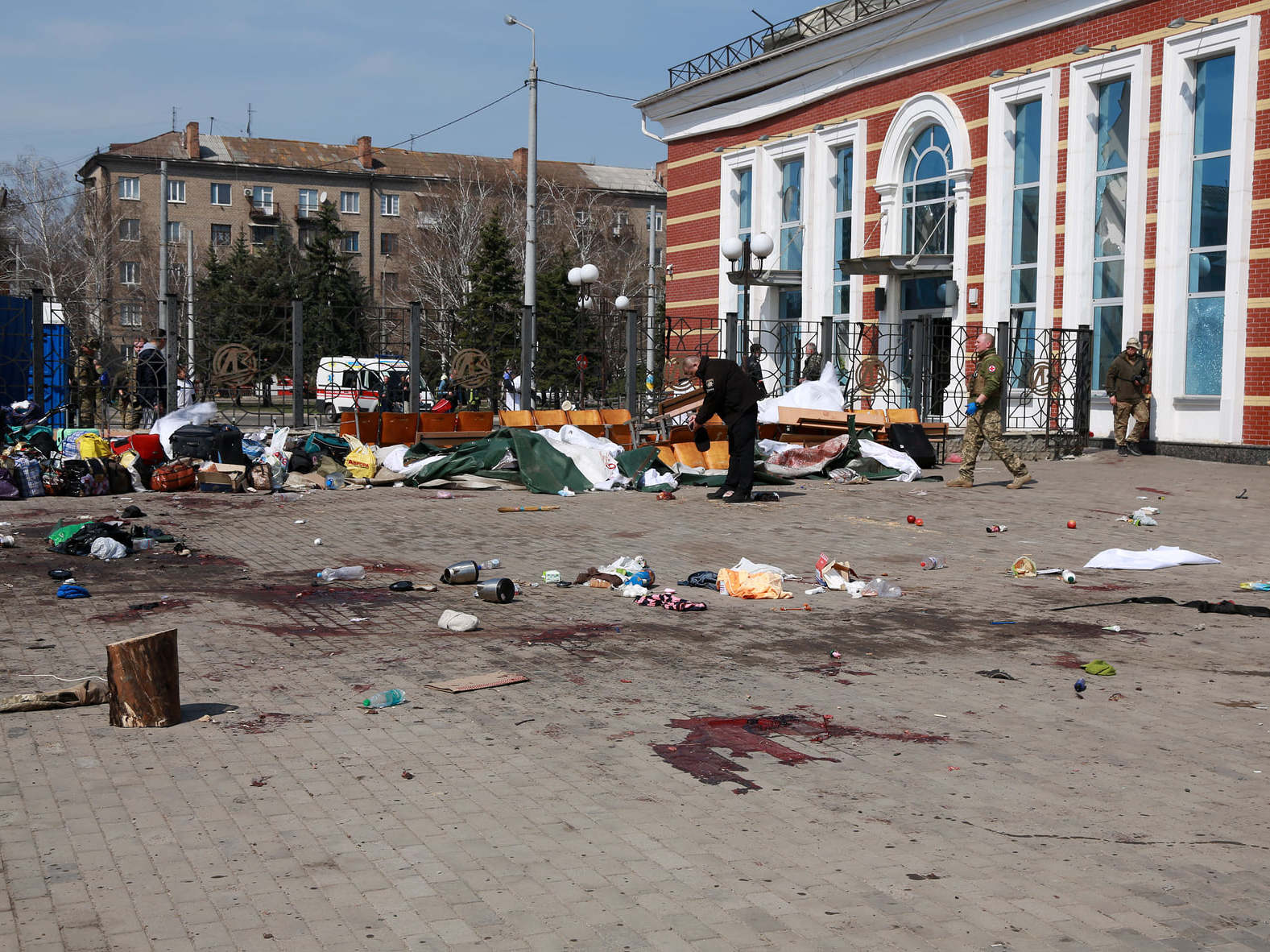
Aftermath of the Kramatorsk railway station attack by Russia, which killed 63 civilians

On 11 April, Zelenskyy said Ukraine expected a new Russian offensive in the east. American officials said Russia had withdrawn or been repulsed elsewhere and was preparing a retraction, resupply, and redeployment to the southeastern Ukraine front. Military satellites photographed Russian convoys of infantry and mechanised units deploying south from Kharkiv to Izium on 11 April, apparently part of the planned Russian redeployment.

On 18 April, with Mariupol overtaken by Russian forces, the Ukrainian government announced that the second phase of the reinforced invasion of the Donetsk, Luhansk and Kharkiv oblasts had intensified with expanded invasion forces occupying the Donbas. On 22 May, the BBC reported that after the fall of Mariupol, Russia had intensified offensives in Luhansk and Donetsk while concentrating missile attacks and intense artillery fire on Sievierodonetsk, the largest city under Ukrainian control in Luhansk Oblast. On 23 May, Russian forces were reported entering Lyman, capturing the city by 26 May. Ukrainian forces were reported leaving Sviatohirsk. By 24 May, Russian forces captured Svitlodarsk. On 30 May, Reuters reported that Russian troops had breached the outskirts of Sievierodonetsk. By 2 June, The Washington Post reported that Sievierodonetsk was on the brink of capitulation with over 80% in the hands of Russian troops. On 3 June, Ukrainian forces reportedly began a counter-attack in Sievierodonetsk. By 4 June, Ukrainian government sources claimed 20% or more of the city had been recaptured.

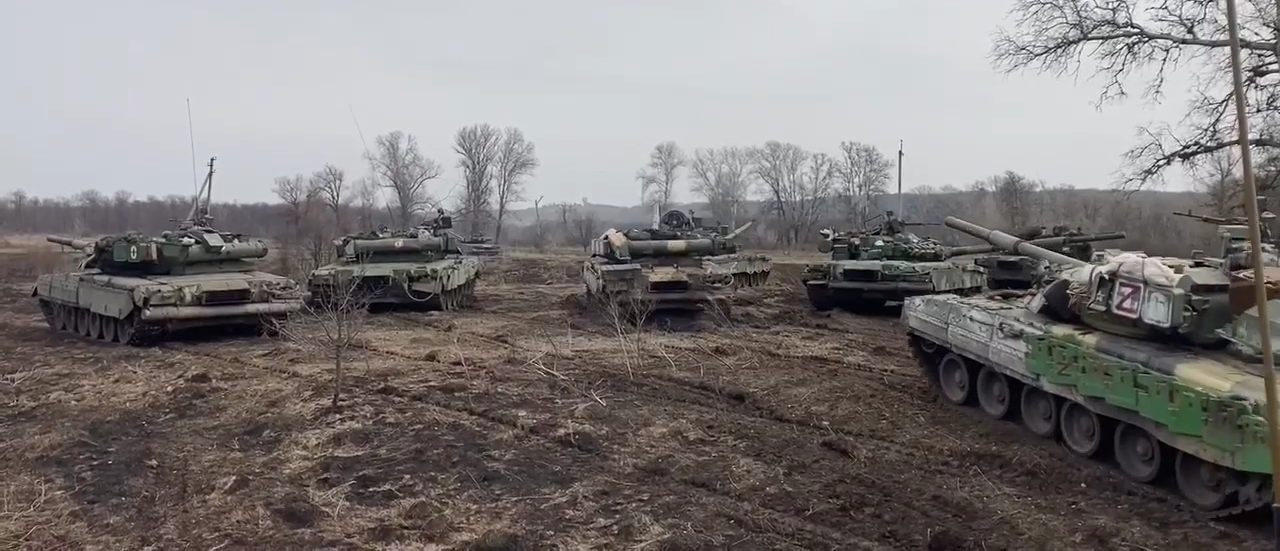
Russian tanks at a pontoon crossing over the Seversky Donets River, 9 April 2022

Ukrainian authorities estimated that 800 Ukrainian civilians were besieged at the Azot chemical factory in Sievierodonetsk; Russian-backed separatists said it sheltered 300–400 soldiers. With the Ukrainian defences of Sievierodonetsk faltering, Russian troops began intensifying their attack on the neighbouring city of Lysychansk. On 20 June it was reported that Russian troops continued to tighten their grip on Sievierodonetsk by capturing surrounding villages.

On 24 June, CNN reported that, amid scorched-earth tactics by advancing Russian troops, Ukraine's armed forces were ordered to evacuate Sievierodonetsk; several hundred civilians taking refuge in the Azot chemical plant were left behind, with some comparing their plight to those in Mariupol. On 3 July, the Russian defence ministry claimed Lysychansk had been captured and occupied. On 4 July, The Guardian reported that after the fall of the Luhansk oblast, Russian troops would continue their invasion into the adjacent Donetsk Oblast to attack the cities of Sloviansk and Bakhmut.

==== Zaporizhzhia front ====
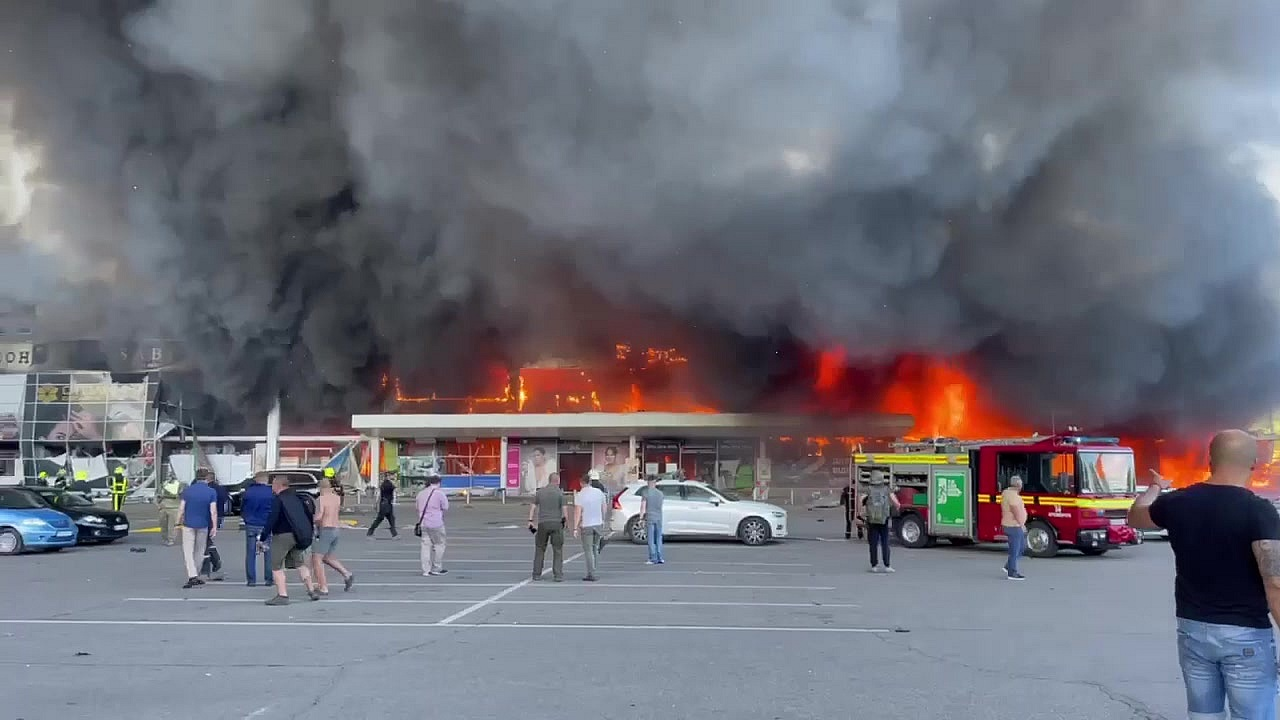
French president Emmanuel Macron called the Russian missile attack on a shopping mall in Kremenchuk on 28 June 2022 a "war crime"

Russian forces continued to fire missiles and drop bombs on Dnipro and Zaporizhzhia. Russian missiles destroyed the Dnipro International Airport on 10 April. On 2 May, the UN, reportedly with the cooperation of Russian troops, evacuated about 100 survivors from the siege of Mariupol. On 28 June, Reuters reported that a Russian missile attack on Kremenchuk, detonated in a mall, had killed at least 18. France's Macron called it a "war crime."

The president of the Ukrainian nuclear agency Energoatom called the situation at the Zaporizhzhia nuclear power plant "extremely tense," saying that it was being operated by Ukrainian staff but controlled by up to 500 Russian soldiers, with Russia shelling nearby areas and storing weapons at the plant. Russia agreed on 19 August to allow IAEA inspectors access to the plant after a call from Macron to Putin. As of July 2023, access to the plant remained limited.

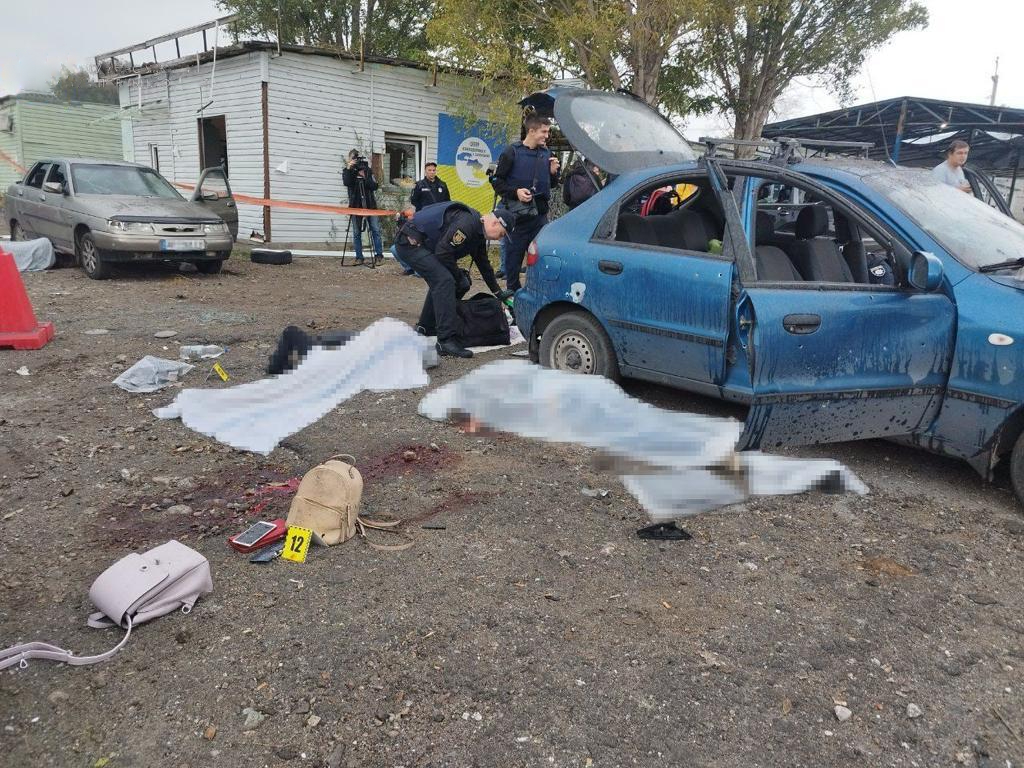
Ukrainian civilians killed by the Russian Armed Forces during the Zaporizhzhia civilian convoy attack in September 2022

Russia reported that 12 attacks with explosions from 50 artillery shells had been recorded by 18 August at the plant and the company town of Enerhodar. Tobias Ellwood, chair of the UK's Defence Select Committee, and US congressman Adam Kinzinger said that radiation leaks would be a breach of the North Atlantic Treaty, under which an attack on a member of NATO is an attack on them all.

=== Russian annexations and occupation losses (6 September – 11 November 2022) ===
Animated map of the Russian invasion from 5 September 2022 to 11 November 2022

On 6 September 2022, Ukrainian forces launched a surprise counteroffensive in the Kharkiv region, beginning near Balakliia, led by General Syrskyi. An emboldened Kyiv launched a counteroffensive 12 September around Kharkiv, successful enough to make Russia admit losing key positions and for The New York Times to say that it dented the image of a "Mighty Putin." Kyiv sought more arms from the West to sustain the counteroffensive. On 21 September 2022, Vladimir Putin announced a partial mobilisation, and Minister of Defence Sergei Shoigu said 300,000 reservists would be called. He also said that his country would use "all means" to "defend itself." Mykhailo Podolyak, an adviser to Zelenskyy, said that the decision was predictable and that it was an attempt to justify "Russia's failures." British Foreign Office Minister Gillian Keegan called the situation an "escalation," while former Mongolian president Tsakhiagiin Elbegdorj accused Russia of using Russian Mongols as "cannon fodder."

==== Russian annexation of Donetsk, Kherson, Luhansk, and Zaporizhzhia Oblasts ====
In late September 2022, Russian-installed officials in Ukraine organised referendums on the annexation of the Donetsk People's Republic and the Luhansk People's Republic, as well as the Russian-appointed military administrations of Kherson Oblast and Zaporizhzhia Oblast. Denounced by Ukraine's government and allies as sham elections, official results showed overwhelming majorities in favour of annexation.

On 30 September 2022, Vladimir Putin announced the annexation of Ukraine's Donetsk, Luhansk, Kherson, and Zaporizhzhia oblasts. Ukraine, the United States, the European Union (EU), and the United Nations all denounced the annexation as illegal.

==== Kherson counteroffensive ====
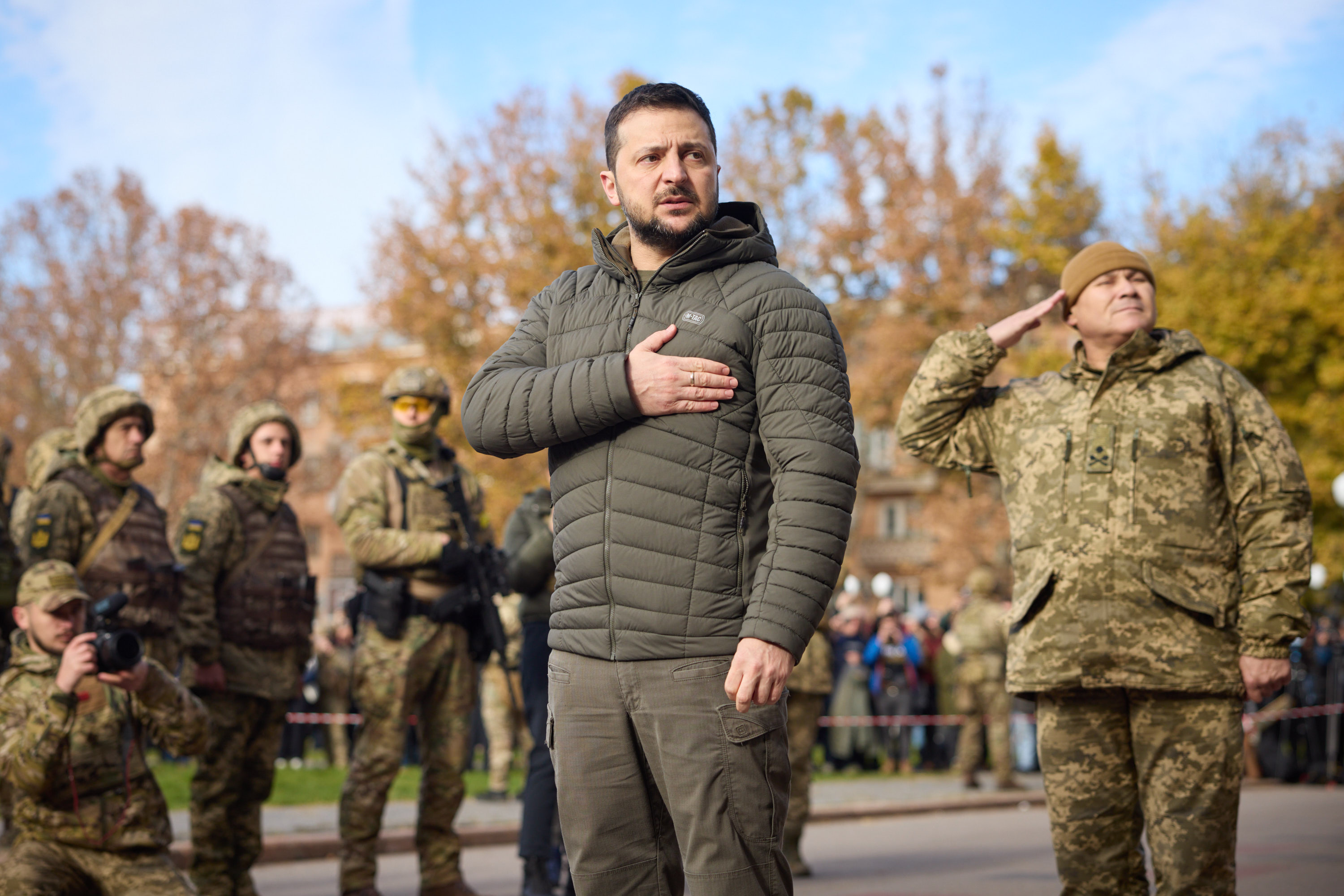
Ukrainian president Volodymyr Zelenskyy, participating in reraising the Ukrainian flag in Kherson a few days after the city's liberation

On 29 August, Zelenskyy announced the start of a full-scale counteroffensive in the southeast to retake Russian-occupied territory in the Kherson and Mykolaiv regions. By 4 September, Ukrainian forces had retaken the village of Vysokopillia. Ukrainian attacks also continued along the southern frontline, though reports about territorial changes were largely unverifiable.

In October, Ukrainian forces pushed further south towards the city of Kherson, taking control of 1,170 square kilometres (450 sq mi), with fighting extending to Dudchany. On 9 November, defence minister Shoigu ordered Russian forces to leave part of Kherson Oblast, including the city of Kherson, and move to the eastern bank of the Dnieper. On 11 November, Ukrainian troops entered Kherson as Russia completed its withdrawal. This meant that Russian forces no longer had a foothold on the west bank of the Dnieper.

==== Kharkiv counteroffensive ====
Retained by Ukraine
Retaken by Ukraine
Occupied by Russia
Map of the Kharkiv front as of 24 April 2026

Ukrainian forces launched another surprise counteroffensive on 6 September in the Kharkiv Oblast near Balakliia led by General Syrskyi. By 7 September, Ukrainian forces had advanced 20 kilometres (12 mi) into Russian-occupied territory and claimed to have recaptured approximately 400 square kilometres (150 sq mi). Russian commentators said this was likely due to the relocation of Russian forces to Kherson. On 8 September, Ukrainian forces captured Balakliia and advanced to within 15 kilometres (9.3 mi) of Kupiansk. Military analysts said Ukrainian forces appeared to be moving towards Kupiansk, a major railway hub, with the aim of cutting off the Russian forces at Izium from the north.

On 9 September, the Russian occupation administration of Kharkiv Oblast announced it would "evacuate" the civilian populations of Izium, Kupiansk and Velykyi Burluk. The Institute for the Study of War (ISW) said it believed Kupiansk would likely fall in the next 72 hours, while Russian reserve units were sent to the area by both road and helicopter. On the morning of 10 September, photos emerged claiming to depict Ukrainian troops raising the Ukrainian flag in the centre of Kupiansk, and the ISW said Ukrainian forces had captured approximately 2,500 square kilometres (970 sq mi). Reuters reported that Russian positions in northeast Ukraine had "collapsed" in the face of the Ukrainian assault, with Russian forces forced to withdraw from their base at Izium after being cut off by the capture of Kupiansk.

By 15 September, an assessment by the UK Ministry of Defence confirmed that Russia had either lost or withdrawn from almost all of their positions west of the Oskil River, abandoning high-value military assets. The offensive continued pushing east, and by 1 October, Ukrainian forces had liberated Lyman.

=== Winter stalemate, attrition campaign and first military surge (12 November 2022 – 7 June 2023) ===
After the end of the twin Ukrainian counteroffensives, the fighting was semi-deadlocked during the winter, with heavy casualties but reduced motion of the frontline. Russia launched a self-proclaimed winter offensive in eastern Ukraine, but the campaign stalled with limited gains. Analysts blamed the failure on Russia's lack of "trained men" and ammunition supplies, among other problems. Mark Galeotti assessed that "after Russia's abortive and ill-conceived winter offensive, which squandered its opportunity to consolidate its forces, Ukraine is in a relatively strong position."

On 7 February, The New York Times reported that Russians had newly mobilised nearly 200,000 soldiers to participate in the offensive in the Donbas. The Russian private military company Wagner Group took on greater prominence, leading "grinding advances" in Bakhmut with tens of thousands of recruits from prison battalions taking part in "near suicidal" assaults on Ukrainian positions.

In late January 2023, fighting intensified in southern Zaporizhzhia Oblast, with both sides suffering heavy casualties. In nearby southern parts of Donetsk Oblast, an intense, three-week Russian assault near the coal-mining town of Vuhledar was called the largest tank battle of the war to date and ended in disaster for Russian forces, who lost "at least 130 tanks and armored personnel carriers," according to Ukrainian commanders. The British Ministry of Defence stated that "a whole Russian brigade was effectively annihilated."

In late 2022, as Russian casualties exceeded 50,000, the Russian army introduced barrier troops. The UK defence ministry stated that these are units that threaten to shoot their own retreating soldiers to compel offensives. In March 2023, Russian soldiers filmed a video addressed to Putin where they stated that after suffering casualties, they attempted to return to their headquarters, but their superiors denied them evacuation, and barrier troops were placed behind them, threatening to "destroy them". In particular, Storm-Z units have been reported to be "kept in line" by barrier troops.

=== Battle of Bakhmut ===
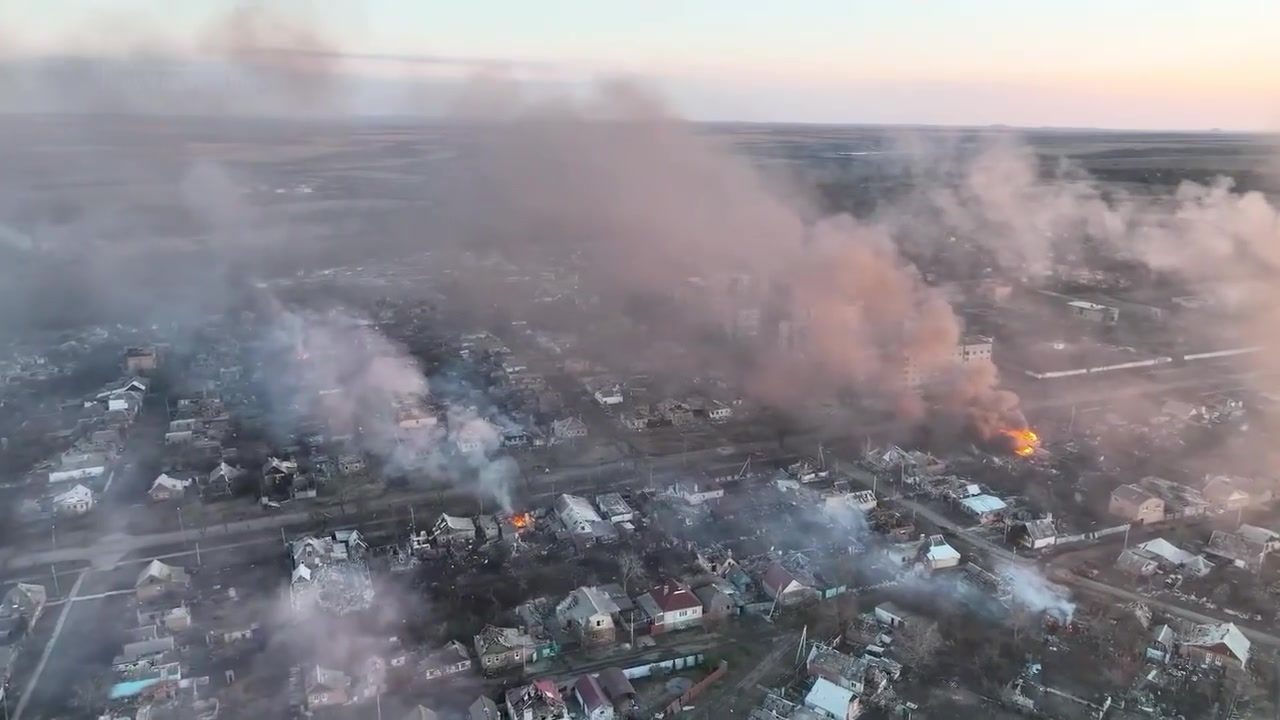
View of western Bakhmut during the battle, 5 April 2023

Following defeat in Kherson and Kharkiv, Russian and Wagner forces focused on taking Bakhmut and breaking the half-year-long stalemate there since the start of the war. Russian forces sought to encircle the city, attacking from the north via Soledar. After taking heavy casualties, Russian and Wagner forces took control of Soledar on 16 January 2023. By early February 2023, Bakhmut was facing attacks from north, south, and east, with the sole Ukrainian supply lines coming from Chasiv Yar to the west.

On 4 March, Bakhmut's deputy mayor told news services that there was street fighting in the city. On 20 May 2023, the Wagner Group claimed full control over Bakhmut, and a victory in the battle was officially declared by Russia the next day, following which Wagner forces retreated from the city and were replaced by regular Russian units.

=== 2023 Ukrainian counteroffensives (8 June 2023 – 1 December 2023) ===
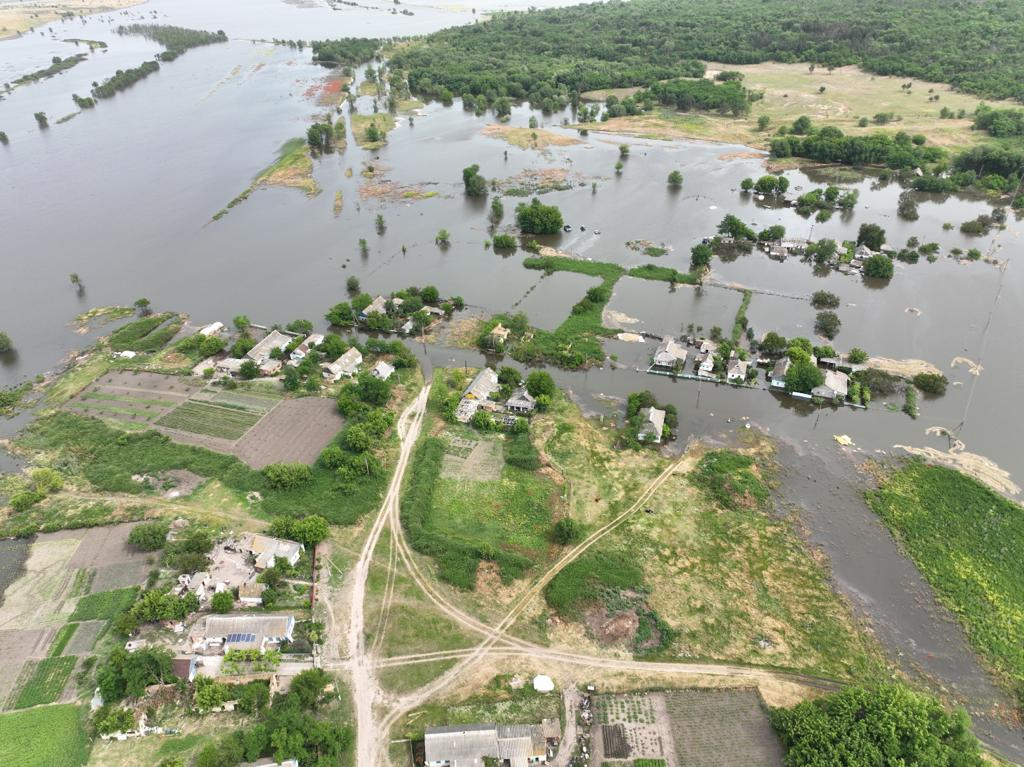
Flood in Kherson Oblast on 10 June 2023 caused by the destruction of the Kakhovka Dam 4 days earlier

In June 2023, Ukrainian forces launched counteroffensives on multiple fronts. Efforts faced stiff Russian resistance. By 12 June, Ukraine reported advances and liberated settlements. On 24 June, the Wagner Group rebellion briefly unfolded before a peace deal. In late June, Ukraine reclaimed territory in Donbas and made gains in Kherson Oblast. Russia heavily mined areas, making Ukraine the most mined country in the world. Following Russia leaving the Black Sea Grain Initiative, Ukraine targeted Russian ships. In September 2023, Russian strikes hit Ukrainian energy facilities, while Ukraine struck the Sevastopol naval base.

In October–December 2023, Ukrainian forces crossed the Dnipro River despite heavy losses. In December 2023, media outlets described the Ukrainian counteroffensive as having failed to regain significant territory or meet its objectives.

=== Battle of Avdiivka ===
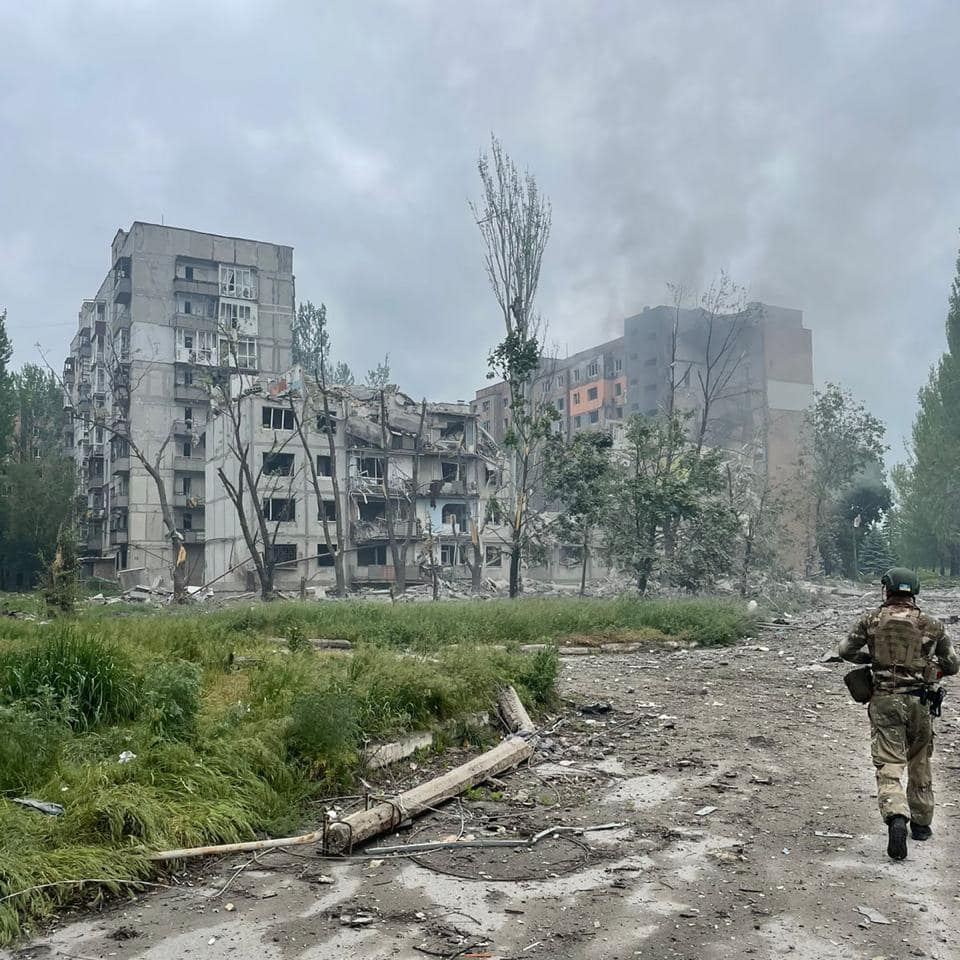
Residential buildings damaged by Russian strikes in Avdiivka during fighting over the city in May 2023

In October 2023, it was reported that there were growing mutinies among Russian troops due to the extensive losses in Russian offensives around Avdiivka, with a lack of artillery, food, and water being reported as well as poor command. By November, British intelligence said that recent weeks had "likely seen some of the highest Russian casualty rates of the war so far."

On 17 February 2024, Russia captured Avdiivka, a longtime stronghold for Ukraine that had been described as a "gateway" to nearby Donetsk. Described by Forbes journalist David Axe as a pyrrhic Russian victory, the Russian 2nd and 41st Combined Arms Armies ended up with 16,000 men killed, tens of thousands wounded, and around 700 vehicles lost.

Ukraine's shortage of ammunition caused by political deadlock in the US Congress and a lack of production capacity in Europe contributed to the Ukrainian withdrawal from Avdiivka and was "being felt across the front," according to Time. The shortage resulted in Ukraine having to ration its units to fire only 2,000 rounds per day, compared to an estimated 10,000 rounds fired daily by Russia.

=== Russian offensives and Ukrainian incursion (April 2024 – present) ===
==== 2024 Russian spring and summer offensives ====
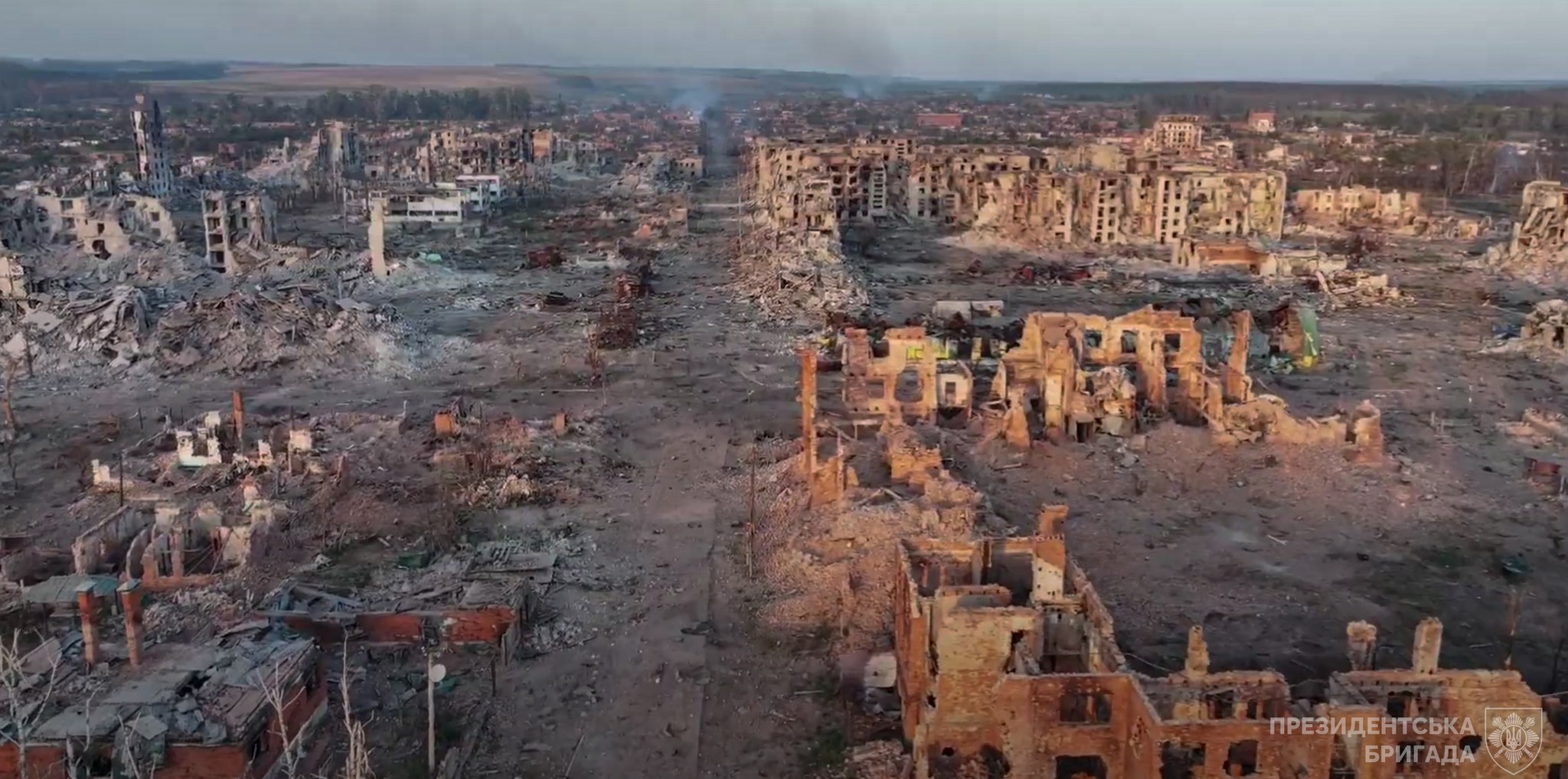
The ruins of Vovchansk following Russia's 2024 Kharkiv offensive

On 10 May 2024, Russia began a renewed offensive in Kharkiv Oblast. Russia captured a dozen villages; Ukraine had evacuated more than 11,000 people from the region since the start of the offensive by 25 May. Ukraine said on 17 May that its forces had slowed the Russian advance, and by 25 May Zelenskyy said that Ukrainian forces had secured "combat control" of areas where Russian troops entered the northeastern Kharkiv Oblast. Russian officials said that they were "advancing in every direction" and that the goal was to create a "buffer zone" for embattled border regions. The White House said on 7 June that the offensive had stalled and was unlikely to advance further.

Following the battle of Avdiivka, Russian forces advanced northwest to form a salient, capturing Ocheretyne in late April. Russian forces also launched an offensive towards Chasiv Yar in early April, and by early July had captured its easternmost district. Another offensive towards Toretsk was launched on 18 June, with the goal of capturing the city, and according to Ukrainian military observer Nazar Voloshyn, flanking Chasiv Yar from the south. Russian forces expanded the salient northwest of Avdiivka in July, and, on 19 July 2024, made a breakthrough to advance towards the operationally significant city of Pokrovsk.

==== Ukrainian offensive into Russia ====
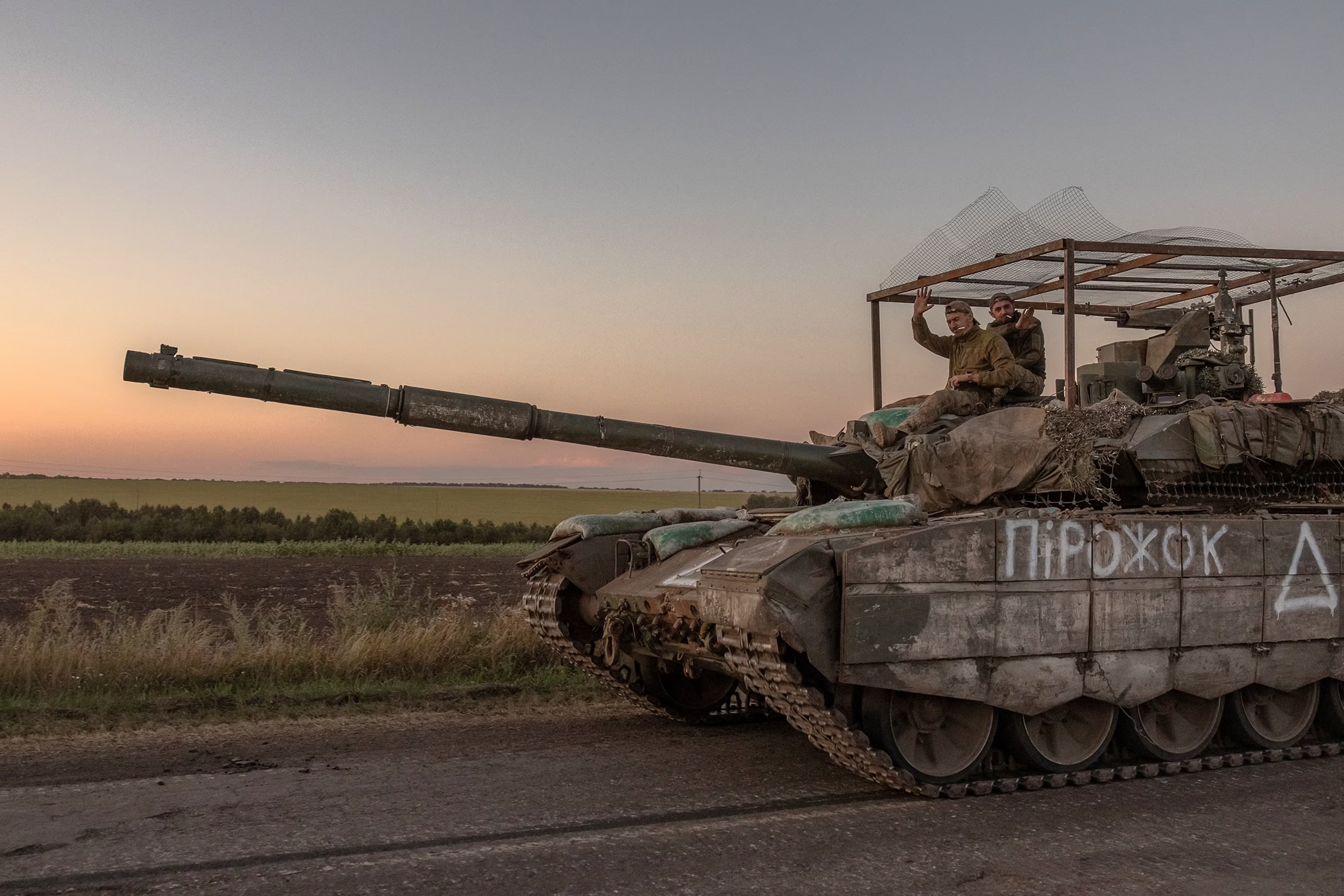
Ukrainian soldiers in Kursk Oblast in August 2024

On 6 August 2024, Ukraine launched their first direct offensive into Russian territory, the largest of any pro-Ukrainian incursion since the invasion's inception, into the bordering Kursk Oblast. The main axis of the initial advance centred in the direction of Sudzha, 10 kilometres (6.2 mi) from the border, which was reported by President Zelenskyy to have been captured on 15 August. Ukraine, taking advantage of the lack of experienced units and defences along the border with Kursk Oblast, quickly seized territory in the opening days of the incursion. The incursion caused Russia to divert thousands of troops from occupied Ukrainian territory.

Despite repeated deadlines set by Putin during 2024 to push out Ukrainian troops, Russian forces had not done so by the end of January 2025, with advances in Donetsk Oblast being prioritised over the Kursk salient. However, by the summer of 2025, Ukrainian forces had been mostly repelled from the area.

==== Late 2024 – 2025 Russian offensives ====
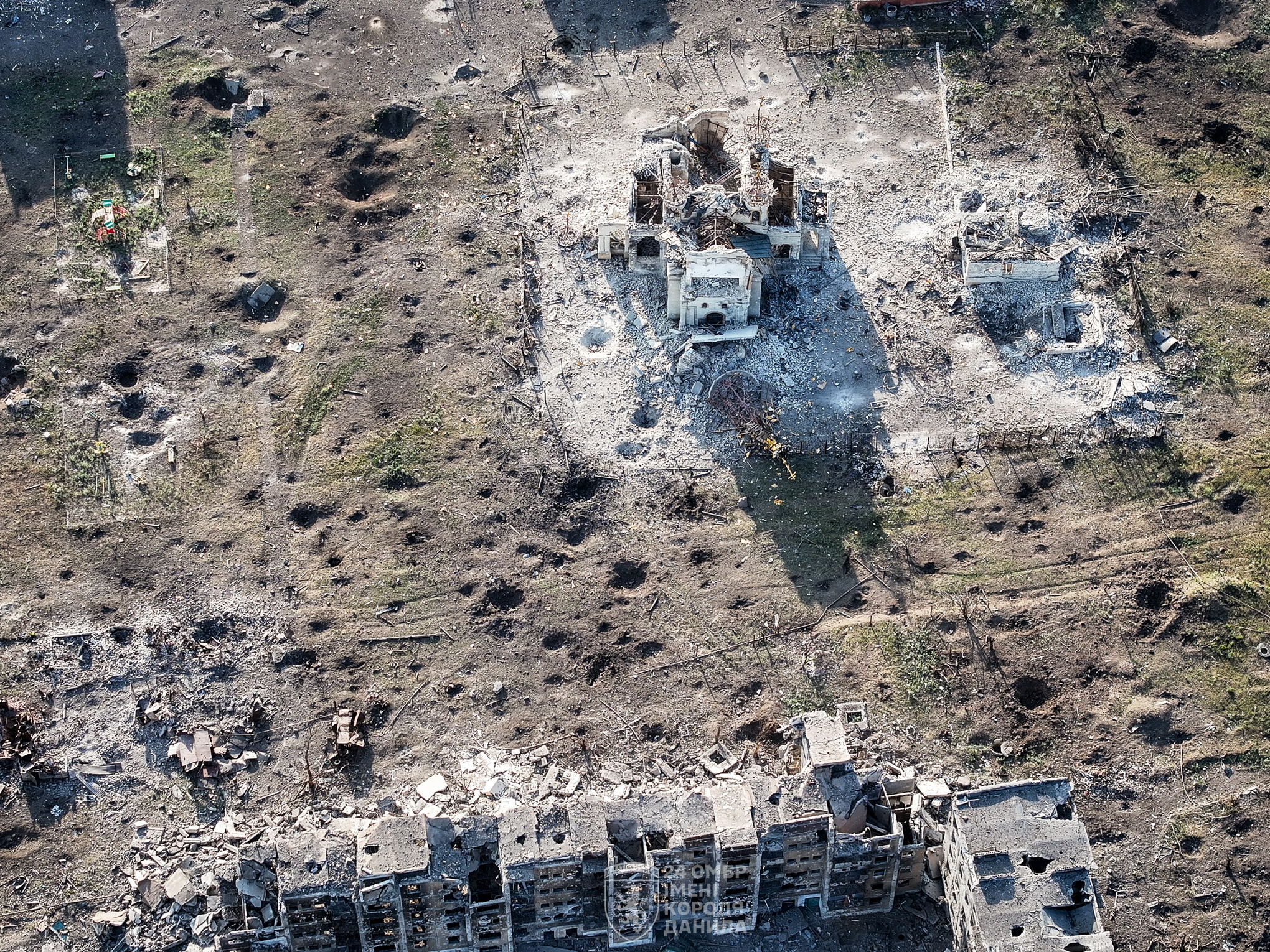
Destruction during the Battle of Chasiv Yar

Use of Russian drones (unmanned aerial vehicles) increased about tenfold from early 2024 through summer 2025.

Russian troops continued advancing in eastern Ukraine at a faster pace than prior to the Kursk offensive, including towards the operationally important city of Pokrovsk.

In late August 2024, Russian forces seized Novohrodivka, southeast of Pokrovsk, while capturing Krasnohorivka and Ukrainsk in early September. In late September, a Russian assault on the long-held city of Vuhledar began; after it fell on 1 October, the city with a pre-war population of about 14,000 was described as a "sprawling ruin."

On 30 October 2024, Ukrainian Major General Dmytro Marchenko was reported to have said "our front has crumbled" due to a dwindling ammunition supply, problems with military recruitment, and poor leadership. He said Zelensky's victory plan was too heavily focused on Western support. Briefings from Western officials had also become more pessimistic. According to the Prosecutor General's Office, more than 100,000 criminal cases for desertion were initiated by the end of November 2024. Russian forces captured the city of Kurakhove in late December 2024 and the nearby Kurakhove Power Station in January 2025.

In early 2025, Russian forces advanced in eastern Ukraine, with Russia claiming to have captured Velyka Novosilka in January. Russia continued attacks on Ukrainian energy infrastructure. In February 2025, Ukraine's government approved a one-year contract for volunteers aged 18–24 not subject to mobilisation. By April 2025, Russian advances had slowed, according to Seth Jones from the Center for Strategic and International Studies. Russian attacks on civilians also intensified, with the month of June seeing the highest civilian casualty count in Ukraine since the start of the invasion, with 232 killed and 1,343 injured. Russia killed at least 21 civilians, including children, in the second-largest strike of the war overnight on 27 and 28 August, damaging European diplomatic facilities along with civilian infrastructure.

Putin declared in March 2025 that "there are reasons to believe we can finish off Ukrainian forces," as a Russian summer offensive was expected. Russia planned to expand into Sumy and Kharkiv; however, the actual offensive was generally considered a failure with modest gains at the cost of heavy casualties. By September 2025, Russian forces had not achieved any frontline breakthroughs, with key strategic objectives like Pokrovsk still held by Ukraine.

Russia escalated attacks on Ukrainian energy infrastructure. In response, Ukraine attacked Russian energy and logistical networks, including targeting oil facilities, causing a Russian fuel crisis.

During October and November 2025, Russian forces intensified operations around Pokrovsk. Russia advanced hundreds of square miles, applying pressure on Ukrainian defensive lines. By late October, there was fighting within Pokrovsk city proper. On 1 December, Russia claimed to have captured the city, although there were still Ukrainian forces in the northern portion. Russia reportedly fully captured Pokrovsk, Myrnohrad, and Huliaipole in early 2026.

In December 2025, following Russian claims of controlling Kupiansk, Zelenskyy visited the city. A Ukrainian commander stated that Russian troops there were surrounded. The ISW reported that Russian ultranationalist milbloggers acknowledged the severity of the situation for Russian forces and that Russian claims of advances in the area were part of a cognitive warfare effort.

==== 2026 Ukrainian counterattacks ====
Early 2026 saw Ukraine make its largest battlefield gains in over two and a half years (not counting the Kursk offensive): according to ISW data, it retook over 200 square kilometres (77 sq mi) between 11 and 15 February. The advance coincided with the Russian military being blocked from using Starlink, causing communication issues compounded by the Russian government cutting access to Telegram. Despite this, Russia gained net territory in February. Western officials also said that for the first time since the invasion, Russia was suffering more losses than it was able to recruit new personnel.

In April 2026, the Unmanned Systems Forces of Ukraine launched the middle strike campaign against Russian-occupied territories, especially Crimea, with one-way attack drones.

In mid-May 2026, Russia's spring offensive was described as unsuccessful by battlefield experts and military analysts, with Ukraine regaining more territory than it had lost for the second time in the year. The same month, Russia launched one of the largest combined aerial assaults of the war against Kyiv and other cities. In Kyiv, a residential building was destroyed, killing 24. The following months saw Russia escalating air attacks as its progress on the front slowed, with the UN reporting a significant rise in Ukrainian civilians killed.

In September, it was reported that Ukraine had successfully counterattacked Russian forces north of Lyman in Donetsk, retaking about 200 square kilometres (77 sq mi) and disrupting Russian plans to encircle Ukrainian defences in the region.

== Battlespaces ==
=== Command ===
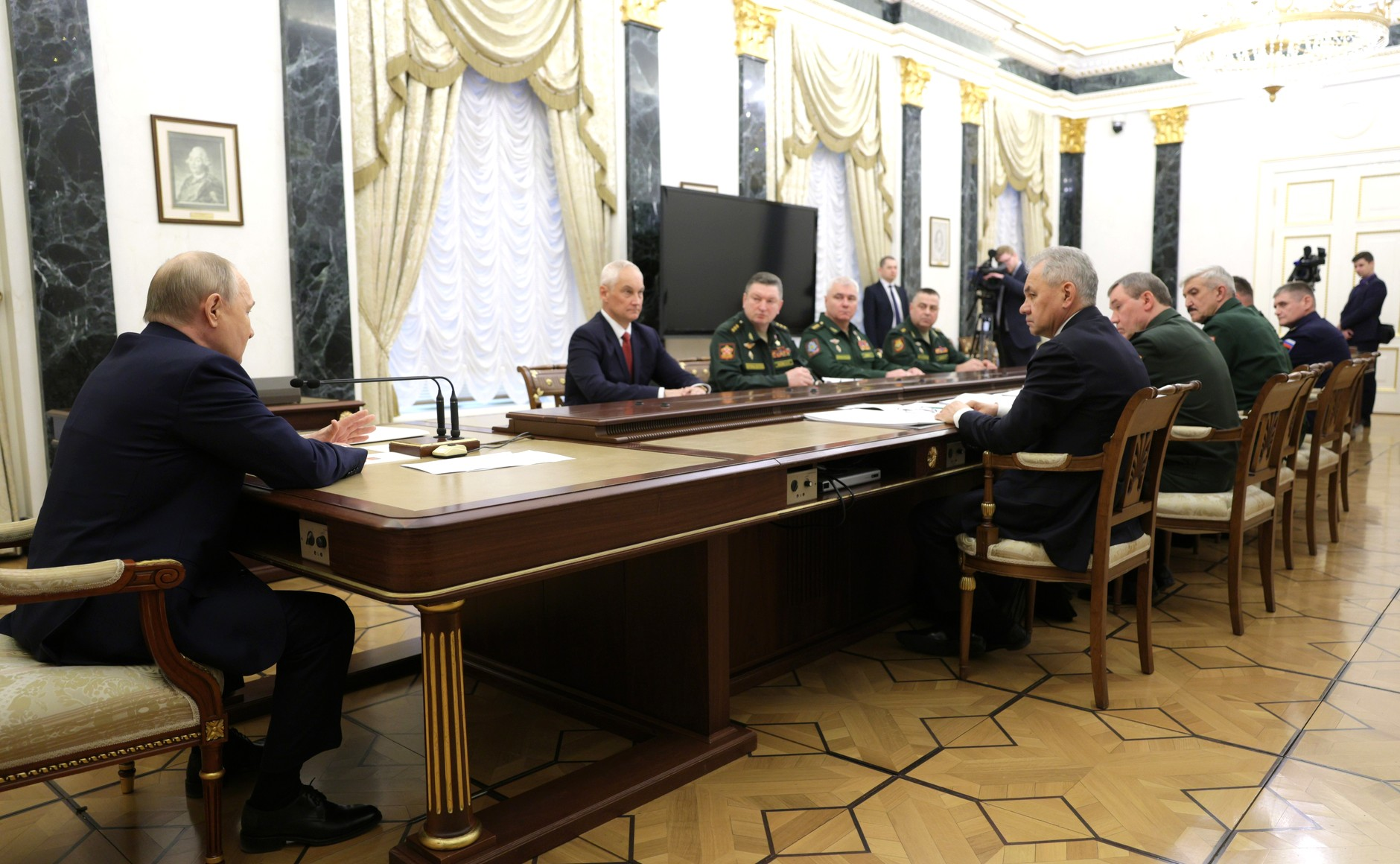
Putin with Shoigu, Gerasimov, Belousov, Yevkurov and commanders of military districts of Russia on 15 May 2024

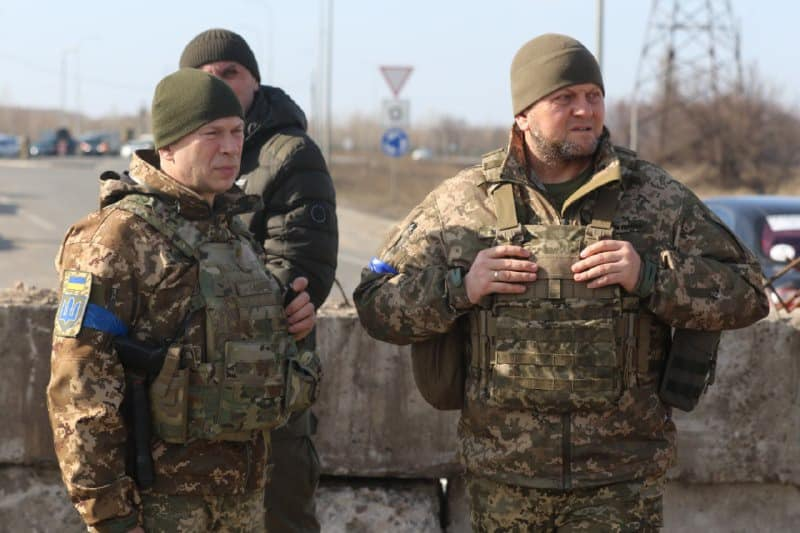
Ukrainian commanders Oleksandr Syrskyi and Valerii Zaluzhnyi

==== Russia ====
As head of state, Vladimir Putin is the supreme commander of Russia's armed forces. Putin has reportedly intervened in operational decisions, bypassing senior commanders and giving orders directly to brigade commanders. Additionally, during the initial period of the war Russian forces suffered from a lack of unified command, with leadership of the operation divided between the four military districts involved in it.

According to US officials, the commander of the Russian Southern Military District, Aleksandr Dvornikov, was placed in overall command on 8 April 2022. Analysts of the OSINT organisation CIT speculated that Dvornikov had been replaced by Gennady Zhidko in late May 2022, with US officials quoted in The New York Times also speculating that he had "disappeared".

In October 2022 the Russian ministry of defence officially announced that Sergei Surovikin had been placed in charge of Russia's forces fighting in Ukraine; according to analyst John Hardie writing for the Long War Journal, Surovikin was "likely the operation's first true unified commander". Surovikin, whom Hardie described as "a competent commander", was replaced in January 2023 by Valery Gerasimov. The Russian ministry of defence claimed that Surovikin's replacement was necessitated by the need for a more senior officer to carry out an "amplified range of tasks" and to increase "cooperation between services and branches of the Armed Forces". According to Hardie, Suvorikin's replacement may have reflected "internal power politics".

Gerasimov was still in overall command of Russian forces in the Ukraine war when he reached the mandatory retirement age in September 2025 but was allowed to stay on. According to Australian analyst and former general Mick Ryan writing in September 2023, Russian forces benefited from this unification of command.

Particularly during the opening months of the war, Russia suffered a remarkably large number of casualties in the ranks of its officers, including a number of generals.

==== Ukraine ====
General Valerii Zaluzhnyi was commander-in-chief of the Armed Forces of Ukraine from before the start of the war in February 2022. US General Mark Milley wrote in May 2022 that Zaluzhnyi had "emerged as the military mind his country needed. His leadership enabled the Ukrainian armed forces to adapt quickly with battlefield initiative against the Russians." Following reported disputes between Zaluzhnyi and Volodomir Zelenskyy, Zaluznhy was replaced by Oleksandr Syrskyi in February 2024. According to Mykhailo Podolyak, Zaluzhnyi's replacement was motivated by the need to revise tactics and prevent stagnation of the front in the aftermath of Ukraine's 2023 counteroffensive. In July 2026, Zelenskyy replaced Syrskyi with Mykhailo Drapatyi amidst a military leadership crisis and protests demanding the reinstatement of Mykhailo Fedorov as Minister of Defence and the removal of Syrskyi.

=== Missile attacks and aerial warfare ===
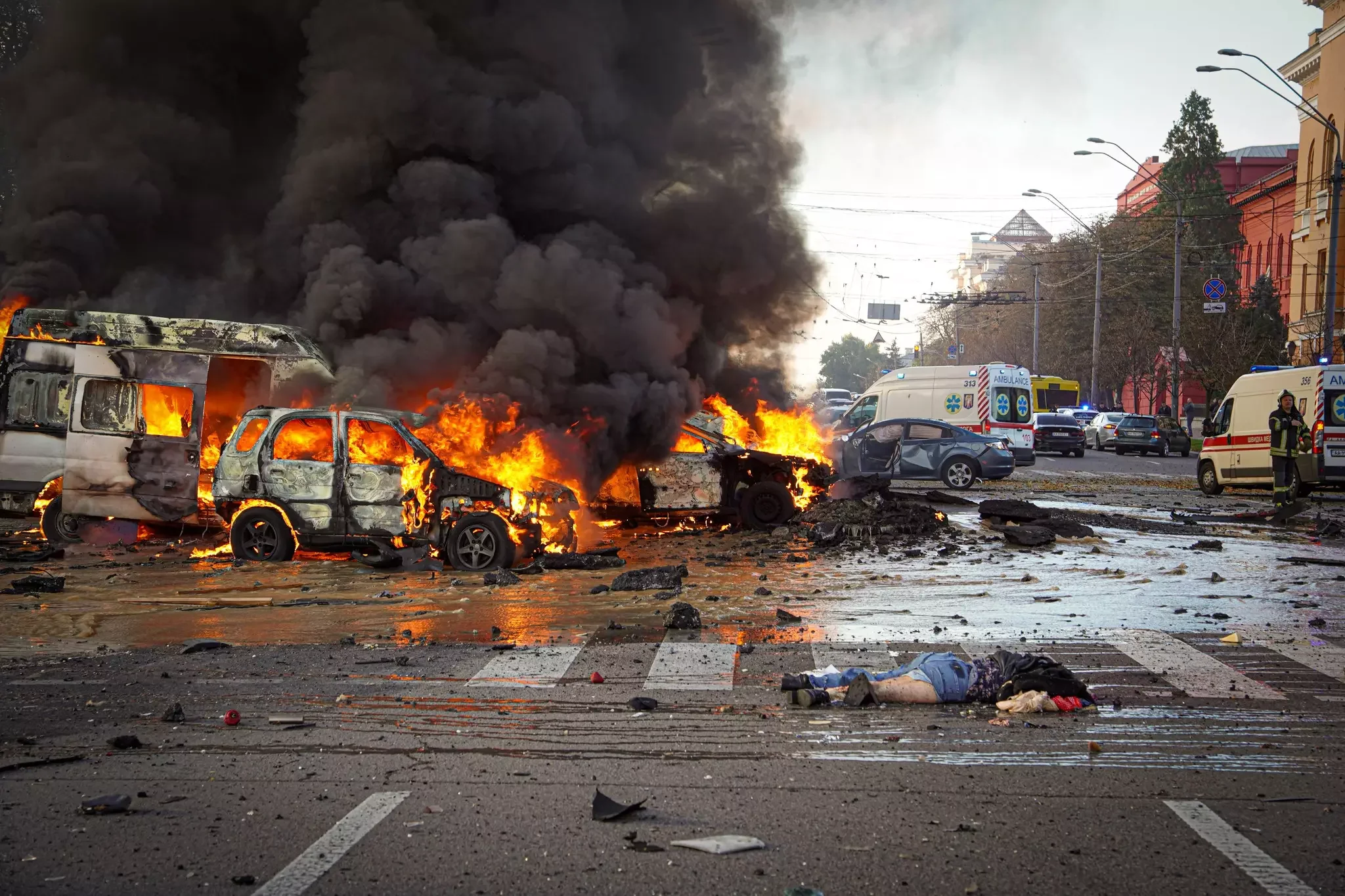
Burning cars and civilians killed in Kyiv following Russian missile and drone strikes on 10 October 2022

Aerial warfare began the first day of the invasion. Dozens of missile attacks were recorded across both eastern and western Ukraine, as far west as Lviv.

By September 2022, Ukrainian air forces had shot down about 55 Russian warplanes. In mid-October, Russian forces launched missile strikes against Ukrainian infrastructure, intended to knock out energy facilities. By late November, hundreds of civilians had been killed or wounded, and rolling blackouts had left millions without power.

In December 2022, drones launched from Ukraine allegedly carried out several attacks on Dyagilevo and Engels air bases in western Russia, killing 10 and heavily damaging two Tu-95 aircraft.

On 1 June 2025, Ukraine carried out "Operation Spiderweb," targeting several air bases deep inside Russian territory using smuggled drones. The operation was seen as successful, with Ukraine saying it had damaged or destroyed 41 high-value aircraft, including strategic bombers used to coordinate and launch attacks on Ukrainian cities. US officials assessed a lower number, saying that Ukraine had hit 20 planes, destroying 10. The operation is estimated to have caused billions of dollars in damage to Russian aircraft.

==== Crimea attacks ====
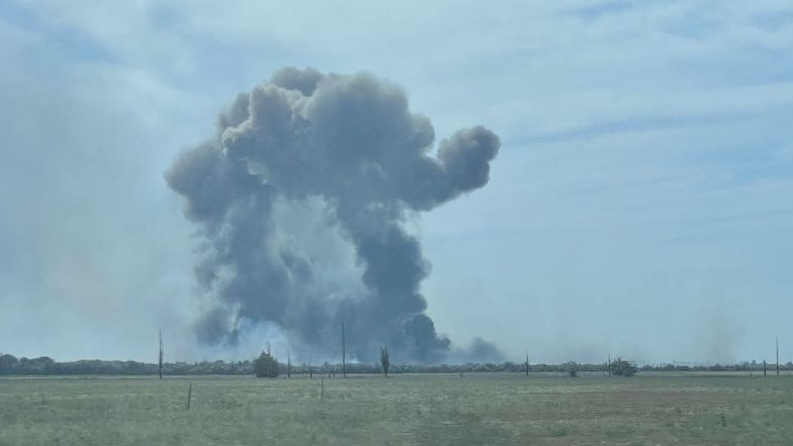
Smoke from the Ukrainian attack on Saky airbase, Crimea, 2022

On 31 July 2022, Russian Navy Day commemorations were cancelled after a drone attack reportedly wounded several people at the Russian Black Sea Fleet headquarters in Sevastopol. On 9 August 2022, large explosions were reported at Saky Air Base in western Crimea. Satellite imagery showed at least eight aircraft damaged or destroyed. Ukrainian general Valerii Zaluzhnyi claimed responsibility on 7 September.

A week later Russia blamed "sabotage" for explosions and a fire at an arms depot near Dzhankoi in northeastern Crimea that also damaged a railway line and power station. Russian regional head Sergei Aksyonov said that 2,000 people were evacuated from the area. On 18 August, explosions were reported at Belbek Air Base north of Sevastopol. On 8 October 2022 the Kerch Bridge, linking occupied Crimea to Russia, partially collapsed due to an explosion. On 17 July 2023, there was another large explosion on the bridge. On 3 June 2025, an attack with underwater explosives damaged the foundations of the bridge; traffic resumed within hours.

==== Russian attacks against Ukrainian civilian infrastructure ====
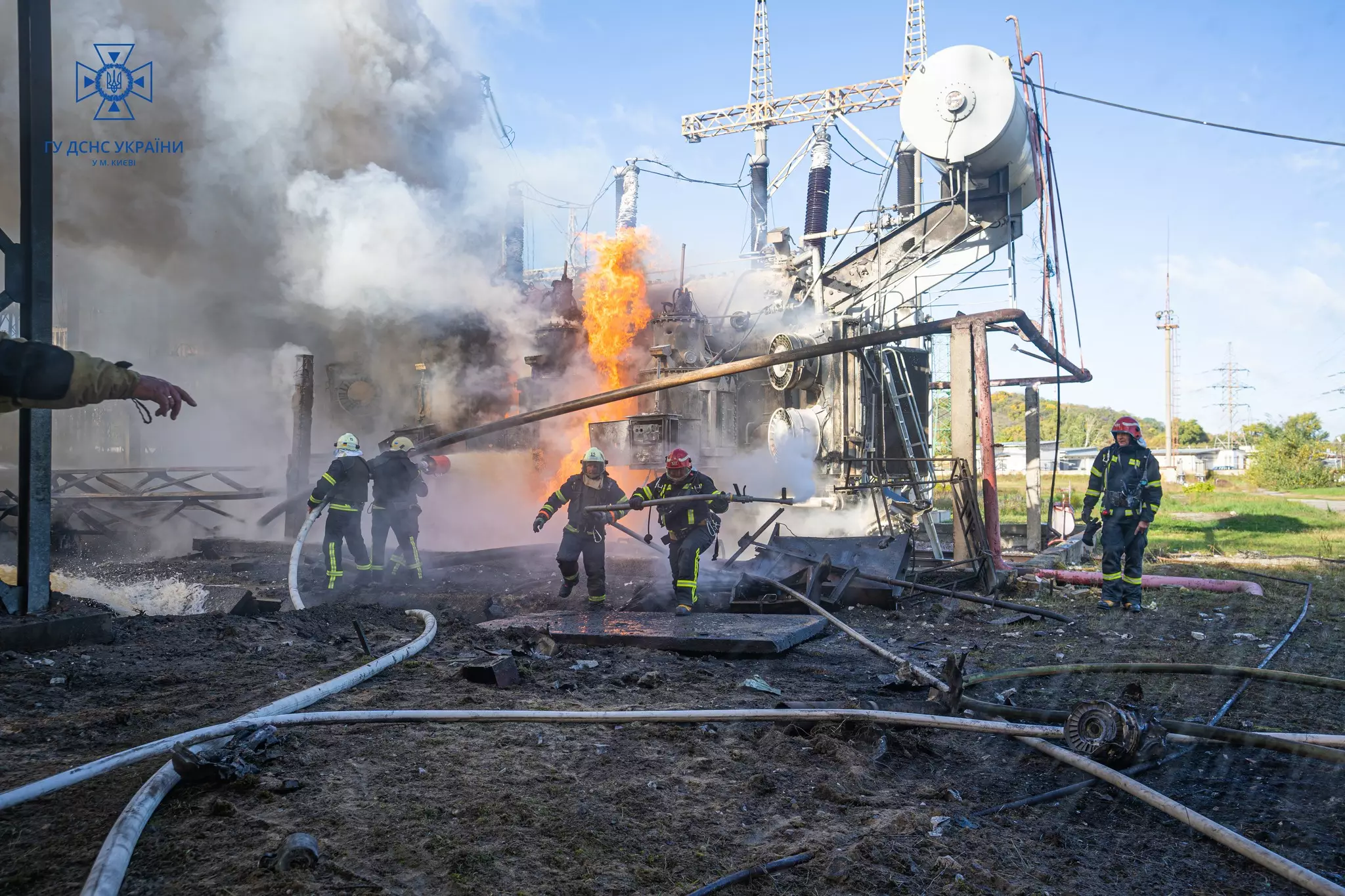
Fires on a combined heat and power plant in Kyiv after Russian missile strikes on 10 October 2022

Since 2022, Russia has carried out strikes on Ukrainian electrical and water systems. On 6 October 2022, the Ukrainian military reported that 86 Shahed 136 kamikaze drones had been launched by Russian forces, and between 30 September and 6 October, Ukrainian forces had destroyed 24 out of 46 launched. On 8 October, it was announced that General of the Army Sergey Surovikin would be commanding all Russian forces on the strength of his novel air assault technique. On 16 October, The Washington Post reported that Iran was planning to supply Russia with drones and missiles. On 18 October, the US State Department accused Iran of violating Resolution 2231 by selling Shahed 131 and Shahed 136 drones to Russia, agreeing with France and the UK. Iran denied sending arms for the Ukraine war. On 22 October, France, Britain, and Germany called for a UN investigation. On 1 November, CNN reported that Iran was preparing to send ballistic missiles and other weapons to Russia for use in Ukraine.

On 15 November 2022, Russia fired 85 missiles at the Ukrainian power grid, causing power outages in Kyiv and neighbouring regions. In March 2023, The New York Times reported that Russia had used new hypersonic missiles in a massive missile attack on Ukraine. Such missiles are more effective in evading conventional Ukrainian anti-missile defences.

The UK Defence Ministry said strikes against Ukrainian infrastructure are part of Russia's 'Strategic Operation for the Destruction of Critically Important Targets' (SODCIT) military doctrine, intended to demoralise the population and force the Ukrainian leadership to capitulate. According to the Royal United Services Institute, half of Ukraine's electricity production capacity had been destroyed.

On 8 July 2024, Russia used a Kh-101 missile to kill two and injure 16 at the Okhmatdyt Children's Hospital in Kyiv. At least 20 civilians were killed in Kyiv that night.

In late 2024, Russia switched from attacking energy distribution infrastructure to striking power stations, affecting 15% of Ukraine's pre-war generating capacity. From the summer of 2025, attacks switched back to infrastructure with a much greater number of drones and ballistic missiles. Strikes were also made on Ukrainian gas production, with 60% of its capacity destroyed in October 2025.

==== Ukrainian attacks on Russian oil production ====
In 2025, Ukraine intensified efforts to disrupt Russian oil production and export facilities, using drone and missile strikes assisted by Western targeting intelligence. By late October 2025, an estimated 50% of Russia's 38 major refineries had been hit more than once. The result has been an estimated drop in oil production of between 10 and 15%, leading to raised domestic fuel prices and shortages in some regions.

=== Naval blockade and engagements ===
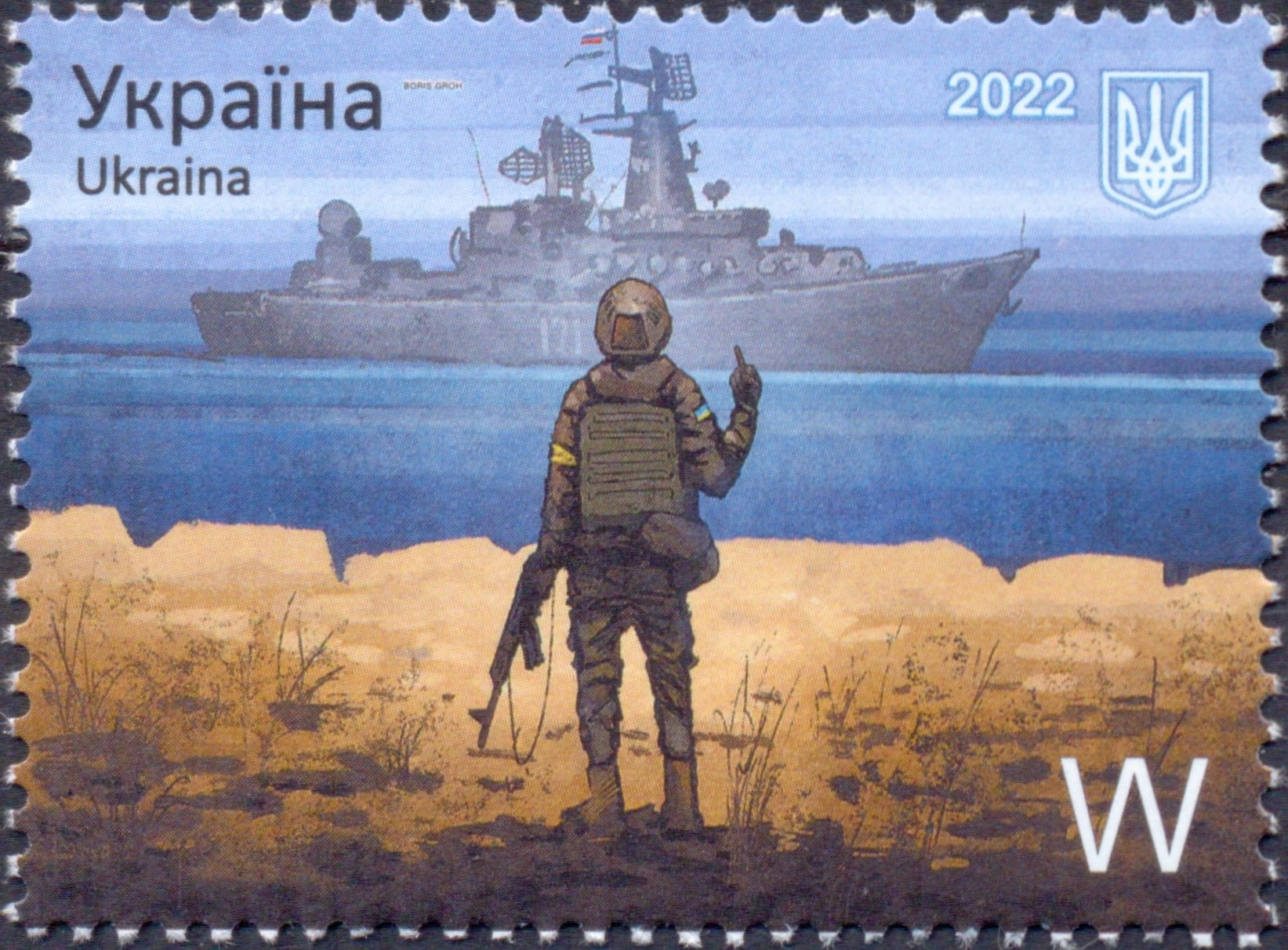
Commemorative stamp about the phrase Russian warship, go fuck yourself!

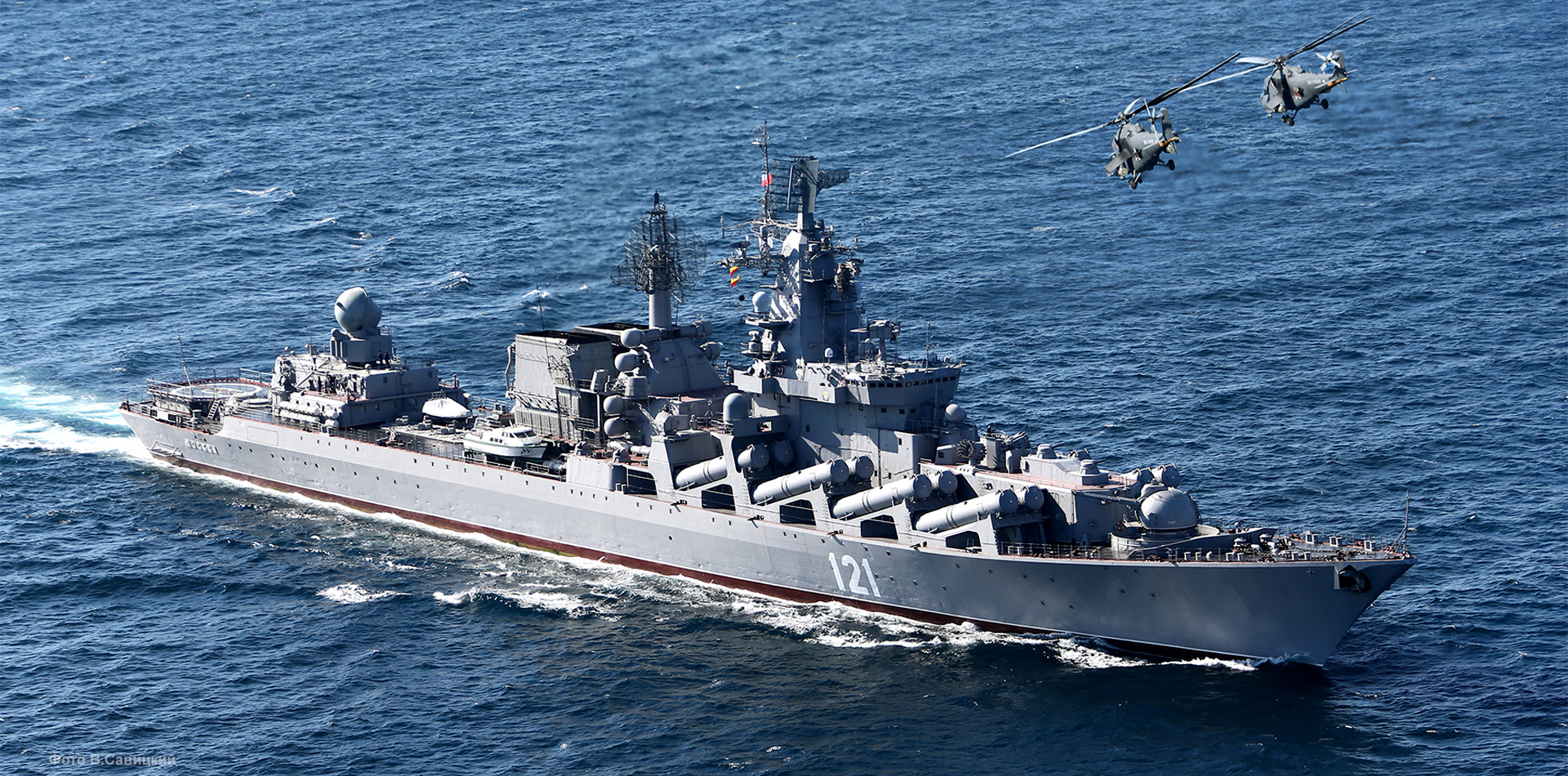
The Russian Black Sea flagship Moskva was sunk on 14 April 2022, reportedly after being hit by two Ukrainian Neptune anti-ship missiles.

On 28 February 2022, Turkey invoked the 1936 Montreux Convention and sealed off the Bosphorus and Dardanelles straits to Russian warships that were not registered to Black Sea home bases and returning to their ports of origin. It specifically denied passage to four Russian naval vessels. On 24 February, the State Border Guard Service of Ukraine announced that Russian Navy ships had begun an attack on Snake Island. The guided missile cruiser and flagship of the Black Sea Fleet, Moskva and patrol boat Vasily Bykov bombarded the island. The Russian warship instructed the Ukrainians on the island to surrender. Their response was "Russian warship, go fuck yourself!" After the bombardment, Russian soldiers landed and took control of Snake Island. Russia said on 26 February that US drones had supplied intelligence to the Ukrainian navy to help it target Russian warships in the Black Sea. The US denied this.

By 3 March, Ukrainian forces in Mykolaiv scuttled the frigate Hetman Sahaidachny, the flagship of the Ukrainian navy, to prevent its capture. On 24 March, Ukrainian officials said that a Russian landing ship docked in Berdiansk was destroyed by a Ukrainian rocket attack. In March 2022, the UN International Maritime Organization (IMO) sought to create a safe sea corridor for commercial vessels to leave Ukrainian ports. On 27 March, Russia established a sea corridor 80 miles (130 km) long and 3 miles (4.8 km) wide through its Maritime Exclusion Zone, for the transit of merchant vessels from the edge of Ukrainian territorial waters southeast of Odesa.

The Moskva was, according to Ukrainian sources and a US senior official, hit on 13 April by two Ukrainian Neptune anti-ship cruise missiles. The Russian Defence Ministry said the warship had suffered serious damage from a munition explosion caused by a fire and that its crew had been evacuated. Pentagon spokesman John Kirby reported on 14 April that satellite images showed that the Russian warship had suffered a sizeable explosion onboard but was heading to the east for expected repairs in Sevastopol. Later the same day, the Russian Ministry of Defence stated that the Moskva had sunk. On 15 April, Reuters reported that Russia launched an apparent retaliatory missile strike against the missile factory Luch Design Bureau in Kyiv, where the Neptune missiles used in the Moskva attack were manufactured. On 5 May, a US official confirmed that the US gave "a range of intelligence" to assist in the sinking.

On 1 June, Russian Foreign Minister Sergey Lavrov asserted that Ukraine's policy of mining its own harbours to impede Russian maritime aggression had contributed to the food export crisis, saying: "If Kyiv solves the problem of demining ports, the Russian Navy will ensure the unimpeded passage of ships with grain to the Mediterranean Sea." On 23 July, CNBC reported a Russian missile strike on the Ukrainian port of Odesa, swiftly condemned by world leaders amid a recent UN- and Turkish-brokered deal to secure a sea corridor for exports of foodstuffs.

On 26 December 2023, Ukraine's air force attacked the Russian landing ship Novocherkassk docked in Feodosia. Ukraine said it was destroyed, a claim that independent analysts confirmed. Russian authorities claimed that two attacking aircraft were destroyed. On 31 January 2024, Ukrainian sea drones struck the Russian Tarantul-class corvette Ivanovets in the Black Sea, causing the ship to sink. On 14 February, the same type of Ukrainian sea drones struck and sank the Russian landing ship Tsezar Kunikov.

=== Ukrainian resistance ===
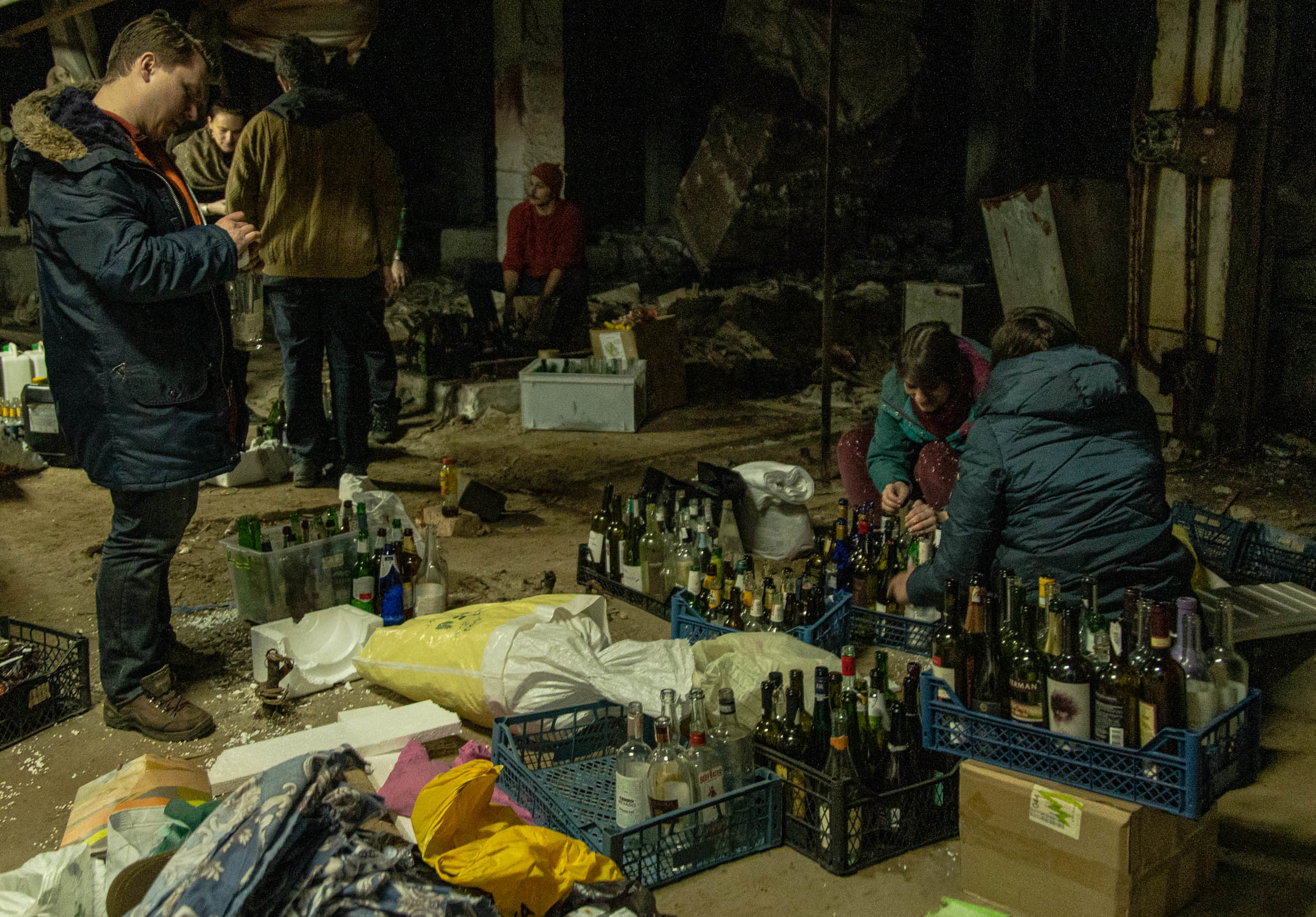
Civilians in Kyiv preparing Molotov cocktails, 26 February 2022

Ukrainian civilians resisted the Russian invasion by volunteering for territorial defence units, making Molotov cocktails, donating food, building barriers like Czech hedgehogs, and helping to transport refugees. Responding to a call from Ukravtodor, Ukraine's transportation agency, civilians dismantled or altered road signs, constructed makeshift barriers, and blocked roadways. Social media reports showed spontaneous street protests against Russian forces in occupied settlements, often evolving into verbal altercations and physical standoffs with Russian troops.

People physically blocked Russian military vehicles, sometimes forcing them to retreat. The Russian soldiers' response to unarmed civilian resistance varied from reluctance to engage the protesters, to firing directly into crowds. To facilitate Ukrainian attacks, civilians reported Russian military positions via a Telegram chatbot and Diia, a Ukrainian government app. In response, Russian forces began destroying mobile phone network equipment, searching door-to-door for smartphones and computers, and, in at least one case, killed a civilian who had pictures of Russian tanks.

=== Energy infrastructure ===
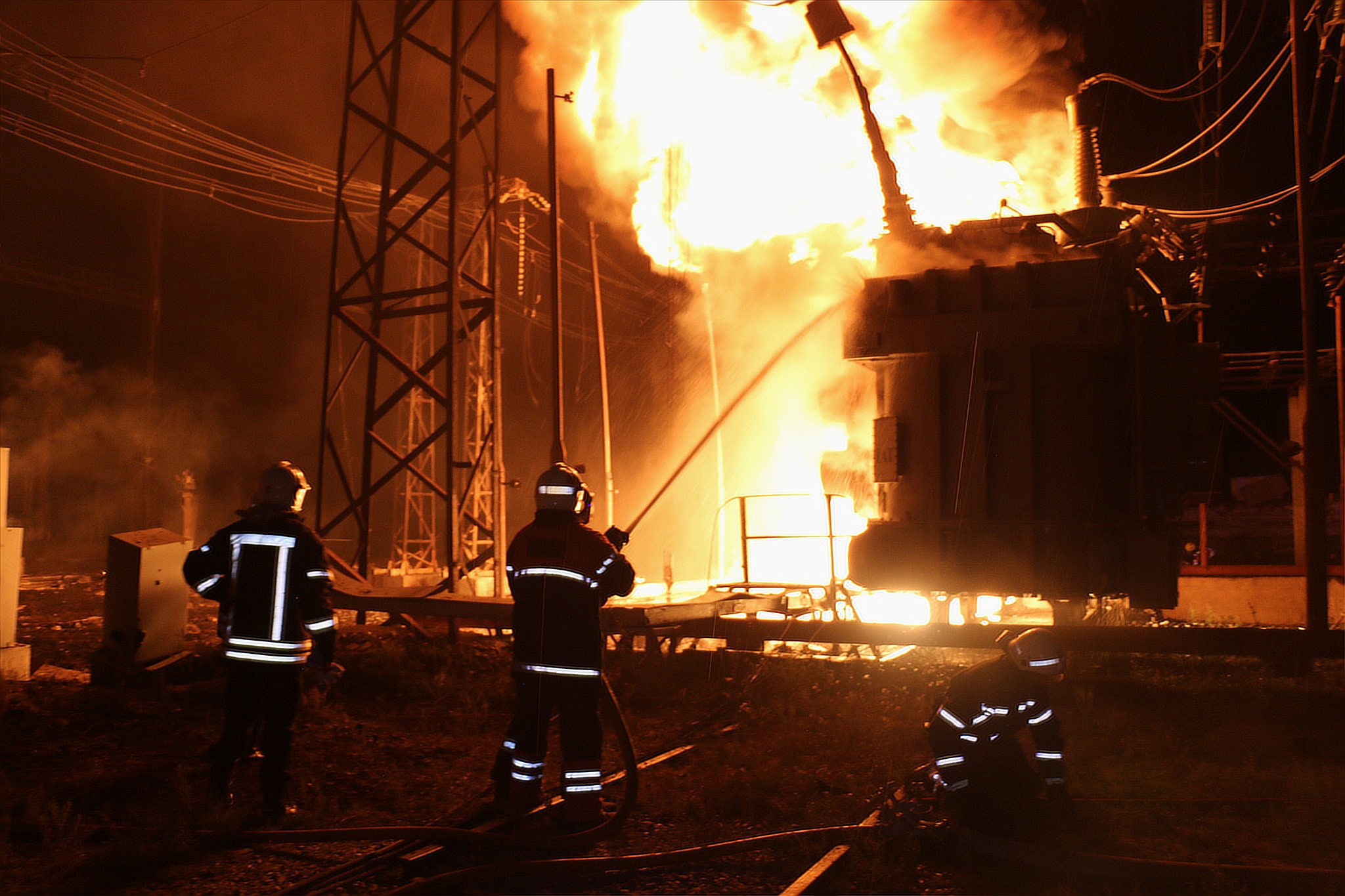
Fire at a power plant in Kharkiv after a Russian strike, September 2022

Throughout the war Russia and Ukraine have attacked each other's energy infrastructure. Ukrainian power generation and heating facilities and Russia's pipelines and refineries were hit.

As a reaction to Russia's recognition of the occupied Ukrainian territories in Donetsk and Luhansk, Germany suspended its certification of the Nord Stream 2 pipeline on 22 February 2022. In September 2022 the inactive Nord Stream pipeline between Russia and Germany was sabotaged, destroying three of the four pipelines. As of August 2025, no party has claimed nor admitted responsibility, and investigations are ongoing. A Ukrainian national was arrested in August 2025 on suspicion of being involved. As part of the economic sanctions against Russia for its war, the EU Commission has banned the use of the Nord Stream pipelines.

Pipelines carrying natural gas and oil from Russia to Central Europe continued to operate during the war in a reduced manner. They have been attacked several times; in May 2025 both sides accused each other of attacking gas infrastructure in Russia's Kursk Oblast. In August 2025 Ukraine repeatedly attacked pumping stations of Russia's Druzhba pipeline, interrupting oil supply to Hungary and Slovakia, while the same month a Russian attack on Ukrainian energy infrastructure left more than 100,000 households without electricity.

By 28 August 2025, Ukraine's campaign to strike at Russia's petroleum industry had hit ten oil refineries and was estimated by Reuters to have disrupted Russia's refinery capacity by at least 17% or 1.1 million barrels a day. The effect was a fuel crisis in Crimea and both southern and far eastern regions with price surges and dry gas stations. In September 2025 the International Energy Agency stated that Russia's revenues from oil product exports had in August declined to five-year lows, contributing to Russia's economic slowdown. Acknowledging Russia's strained energy system, President Vladimir Putin pointed to Russia's coal reserves to offset its gas shortage, insufficient infrastructure, and underdeveloped grid economy.

Following its 14 September 2025 attack on Russia's second-largest refinery, Kinef, the General Staff of the Ukrainian Armed Forces claimed to be "working 'systematically' to weaken Russia's military and economic capabilities with a particular focus on fuel, weapons, and ammunition production."

== Foreign involvement ==
=== Support for Ukraine ===
Countries that have delivered military aid to Ukraine Heavy weaponry Light weaponry Non-lethal materiel Non-materiel Ukraine

Many countries have supplied military aid to Ukraine, including weaponry, equipment, training, and logistical support. Several imposed limited sanctions on Russia in the prelude to the invasion and applied new sanctions when the invasion began, intending to cripple the Russian economy; sanctions targeted individuals, banks, businesses, monetary exchanges, exports, and imports.

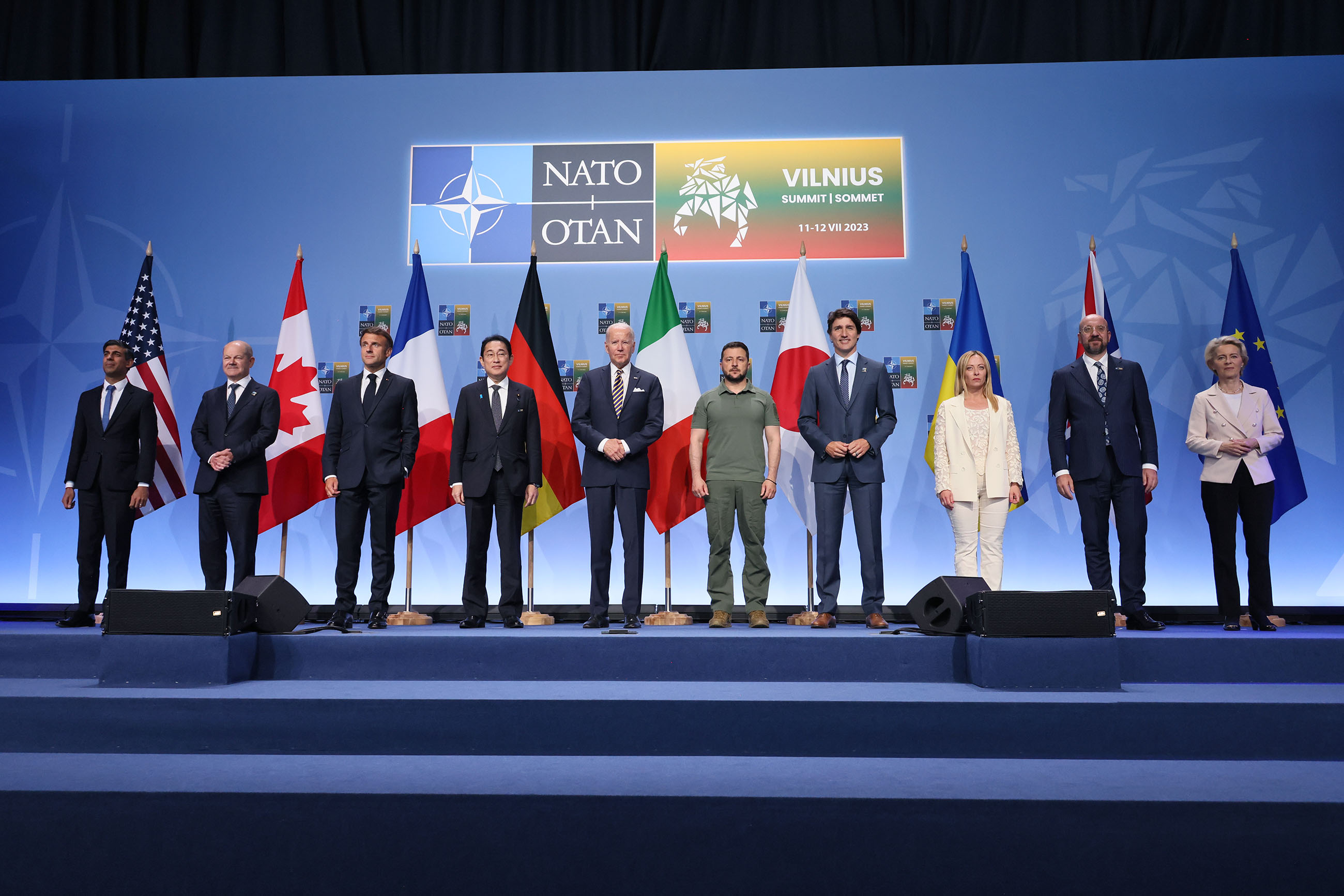
Ukrainian president Volodymyr Zelenskyy and Western leaders at the NATO Summit in Vilnius on 12 July 2023

Military assistance has mostly been co-ordinated through the Ukraine Defence Contact Group, whose more than fifty countries include all 32 member states of NATO. From January 2022 to January 2024, $380 billion in aid to Ukraine was tracked by the Kiel Institute. European countries have provided the most aid in total (military, financial and humanitarian). Estonia and Denmark have provided the most military aid as a share of GDP. The European Union co-ordinated the supply of military aid for the first time. The US has provided the most military assistance to Ukraine, and has set aside $175 billion to help the country. Most of the US military aid has been old American weaponry and equipment from reserve stockpiles, while most of the US funding earmarked for Ukraine stays in the US economy and supports US industries, subsidising the manufacture of weapons and military equipment. Bulgaria supplied Ukraine with over one third of the ammunition needed in the early phase of the invasion and a plurality of needed fuel. Most of Ukraine's supporters ruled out sending troops to the country in the early months of the invasion. Although India has maintained a neutral stance on the invasion, reports indicate that artillery shells made by Indian manufacturers were sold to European countries and then diverted to Ukraine. Indian officials have not intervened despite objections from Russia.

The Russian government has threatened retaliation against countries supplying military aid to Ukraine. According to the Atlantic Council's Peter Dickinson, Russia's government has not followed through on its threats, despite most of its "red lines" being crossed.

Since the start of Russia's invasion, the US has been sharing intelligence with Ukraine, with a focus on finished signal intelligence to aid in targeting. In October 2025, the Wall Street Journal and Reuters reported that the US was to provide intelligence to enable long-range strikes on energy infrastructure deep in Russian territory.

By January 2026, according to French president Macron, the coalition of the willing was providing all of the international military support to Ukraine, with France providing two-thirds of the military intelligence. In April 2026, reports emerged that Ukrainian F-16 pilots had gone through an RAF-led program and were being trained to operate in GPS-denied environments due to extensive Russian electronic warfare.

In June 2026, Ukraine received a €90 billion loan over two years from the EU for increasing defence.

=== Support for Russia ===
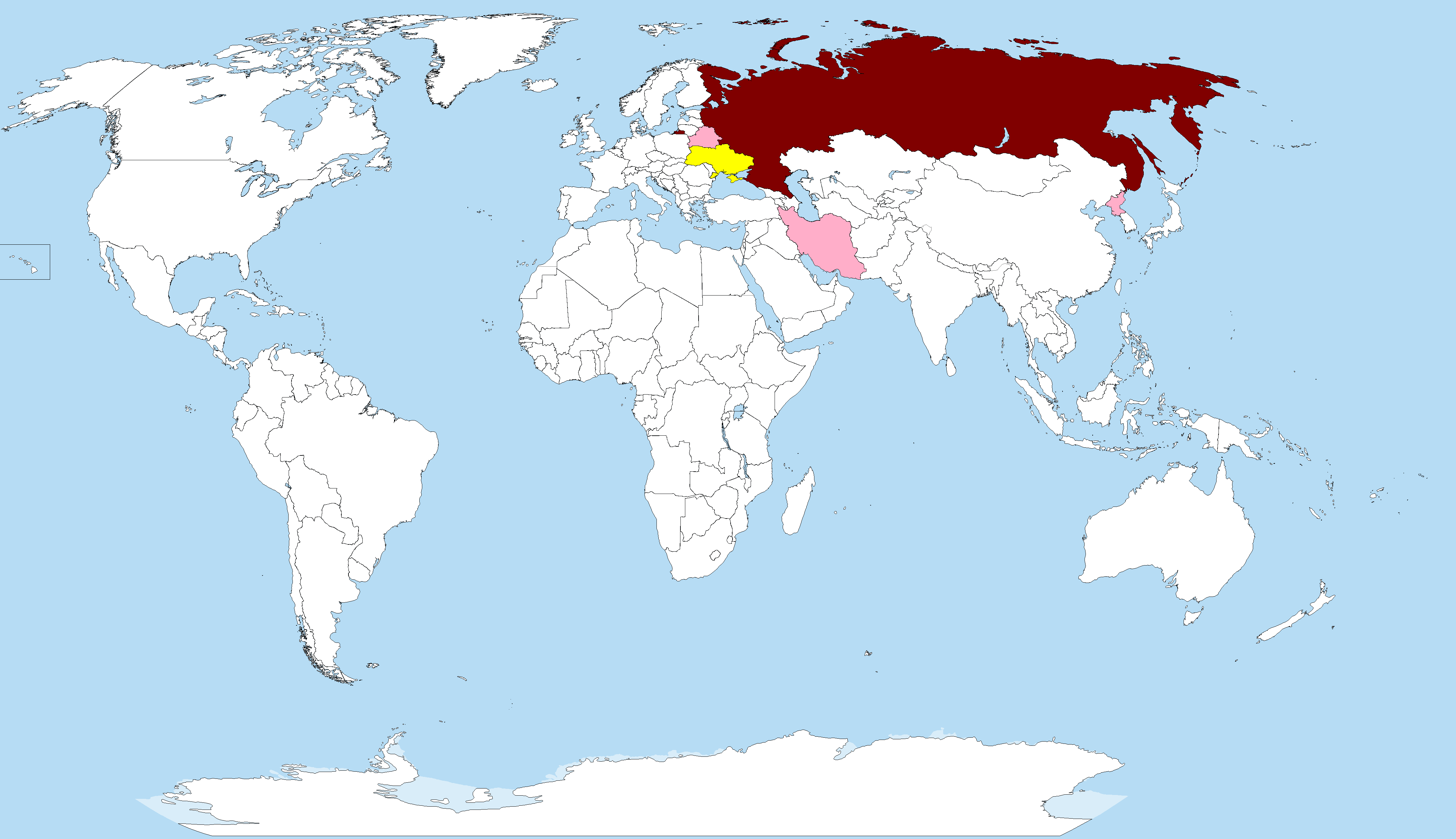
Countries sending weaponry to Russia Russia Ukraine

==== Belarus ====
Belarus has allowed Russia to use its territory to stage part of the invasion and to launch missiles into Ukraine. Belarus airspace was used by Russia, including for radar early warning and control missions, until 2023, when a Russian Beriev A-50 surveillance plane was damaged by drones. Belarus is considered a co-belligerent. Political scientist Matthew Frear considers Belarus a co-combatant, with "Lukashenko repeatedly stating his support for Putin's military actions", while the 2023 issue of the Armed Conflict Survey classified it as not a direct co-combatant. Belarus provided Russia with weapons and ammunition, and later, according to the 2024 issue of Armed Conflict Survey, Russia deployed tactical nuclear weapons in Belarus.

==== Iran ====
In June 2023, US military intelligence suggested Iran was providing both Shahed combat drones and production materials to develop a drone manufactory for Russia. In February 2024, a Reuters report indicated that Iran sent ballistic missiles to the Russian military. According to the US and Ukraine, Iranian troops have been stationed in Crimea to assist Russia in launching drone attacks against civilians and civilian infrastructure. Iran has denied sending arms to Russia for use against Ukraine.

==== North Korea ====
North Korea has supplied Russia with ballistic missiles and launchers. In October 2024, Ukraine and South Korea claimed North Korean engineers had been deployed to the battlefield to help with these missiles and suffered casualties. In October 2024, Zelenskyy announced that Ukrainian intelligence believed there were 10,000 North Korean troops preparing to join Russian forces. The North Korean government stated that none of their soldiers were fighting for Russia.

US officials reported that North Korea had sent 3,000 soldiers to Russia for possible deployment to Ukraine, who were training at military bases in eastern Russia. On 28 October, NATO chief Mark Rutte confirmed earlier Ukrainian intelligence that North Korean troops had been deployed to Kursk Oblast to support Russia against the Kursk offensive, and the Pentagon reported that around 10,000 North Korean soldiers had been sent in total.

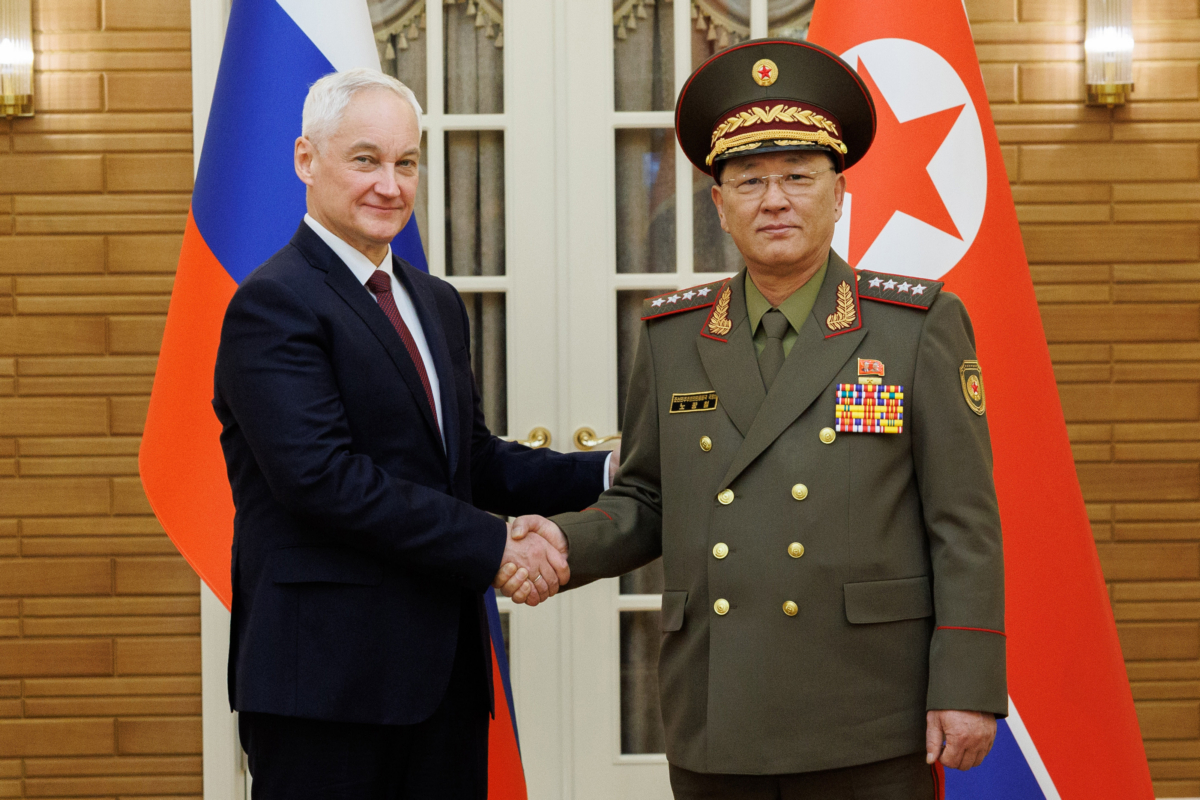
Russian Defence Minister Andrey Belousov with North Korean Defence Minister No Kwang-chol on 29 November 2024

On 7 November, Ukraine's defence minister reported that North Korean troops had engaged in battle on 5 November in Kursk oblast, a report that was confirmed by US and South Korean officials. On 24 November, the Ukrainian chief of general staff confirmed that North Korean troops had been engaged in battle. On 2 December the Pentagon noted that North Korean soldiers had been integrated into Russian units, reports that were echoed by the Ukrainian intelligence directorate. On 16 December, the US confirmed that North Korean troops had been killed in combat in Russia's Kursk oblast. By 18 December, the number of killed and wounded North Korean soldiers had reportedly reached a couple of hundred, while South Korea reported 100 North Koreans dead and 1000 injured. US Army JAG officers Steve Szymanski and Joshua Keruski stated that North Korea had become a party to an international armed conflict with Ukraine as of the 5 November engagement.

Zelenskyy showcased footage that he said showed Russian troops burning the faces of killed North Korean soldiers to conceal their presence.

In January 2025, two North Koreans were taken prisoner while fighting in Kursk Oblast. Intelligence debriefings indicate that North Korean soldiers have been issued false military papers stating that they are Russians. In March 2025, South Korea's Joint Chiefs of Staff said that North Korea had sent an additional 3,000 soldiers early in the year, along with military equipment including short-range ballistic missiles. According to South Korea, roughly 11,000 North Korean soldiers had been sent to Russia, 4,000 of whom were killed or wounded. The same month, Russia acknowledged the presence of North Korean soldiers fighting in Kursk for the first time.

In June 2025, former Russian defence minister Sergei Shoigu announced that 1,000 North Korean military workers would be deployed to Kursk for demining, and another 5,000 for reconstruction. The BBC reported that, in 2024, more than 10,000 North Korean workers were sent to work in "slave-like conditions" in Russian construction and other sectors "in violation of the UN sanctions banning the use of North Korean labour." A South Korean intelligence official told the BBC that as many as 50,000 workers were to be deployed in 2025. In October 2026, a CSIS report said that North Korea had sent around 12,000 workers to produce drones for Russia at the Yelabuga drone factory. Song Young-Chae, an academic and human rights activist, raised human rights concerns saying North Korea was ″effectively conducting slavery of its own people and for its own profit″.

==== China ====
Politico reported in March 2023 that Chinese state-owned weapons manufacturer Norinco shipped assault rifles, drone parts, and body armour to Russia between June and December 2022. According to the US, Chinese ammunition has been used in Ukraine. In May 2023, the European Union identified that Chinese and UAE firms were supplying weapon components to Russia. In April 2024, China was reported to have provided Russia with geospatial intelligence, machine tools for tanks, and propellants for missiles. In September 2024, Reuters reported documents indicating Russia had established a weapons programme in China to develop long-range attack drones, with assistance from local specialists, for use in the invasion.

In September 2026, The Telegraph and Politico uncovered Russian documents showing a Chinese state-owned firm supplying Russia with materials to build drones which Russia uses to attack Ukraine. According to experts, the scale of the shipments and military importance of the destination suggested that Chinese officials were aware.

==== Others and sanction evasions ====
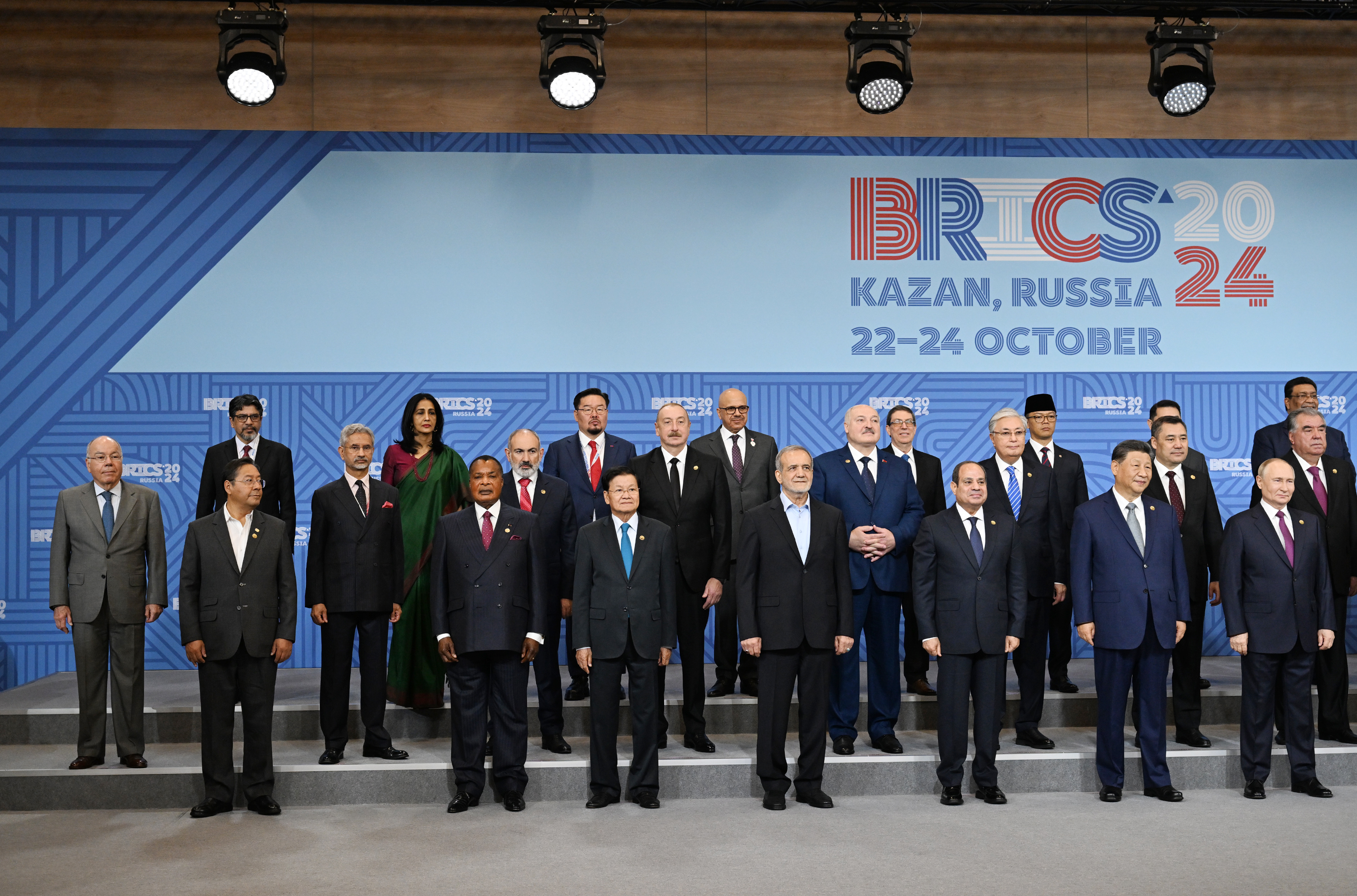
Putin and Chinese president Xi Jinping at the 16th BRICS summit in Kazan, Russia. Most of the Global South countries took a neutral position towards the war and maintained good relations with Russia.

In July 2025, Ukraine's Main Directorate of Intelligence reported that Laos had sent a 50-person demining crew to Kursk, though Laos denied the claim.

Russia imports sensitive electronics, machinery, auto parts, and defence equipment from India. Trade like oil sales has surged since 2022, boosting revenue for Russian state-owned companies. To bypass sanctions and manage its currency surplus, Russia pays in rupees, supporting both civilian and military needs. Reuters reported in July 2025 that according to Indian customs data, an Indian company shipped military-use explosive compounds valued at $1.4 million to Russia in December 2024.

Russia has continued to make billions from fossil fuel exports to the West. Ukraine's Western allies have paid Russia more for its hydrocarbons than they have given Ukraine in aid. In 2025 Slovakia and Hungary rejected an EU plan to phase out deliveries of Russian gas via Turkey by 2028. "Laundromat refineries" in Turkey and India process Russian crude and sell the refined fuel to sanctioning countries. Russia has also developed partnerships with India and the UAE that actively support its efforts to evade sanctions.

In 2022, approximately 400,000 US-made semiconductors worth $53.6 million were shipped to Russia via the Maldives, accounting for almost 20% the Maldives's exports. The Maldives has no native semiconductor manufacturers; all of its exports are by Russian shell companies, most headquartered in Hong Kong. From 2015 to 2021, average annual trade between Russia and Turkey in 45 military-linked materials was $28 million; from January to October 2023, it was $158 million.

From January 2022 to mid-2025, the United States imported $24.51 billion of Russian goods, mainly fertilisers, enriched uranium and plutonium, and palladium.

== Casualties ==
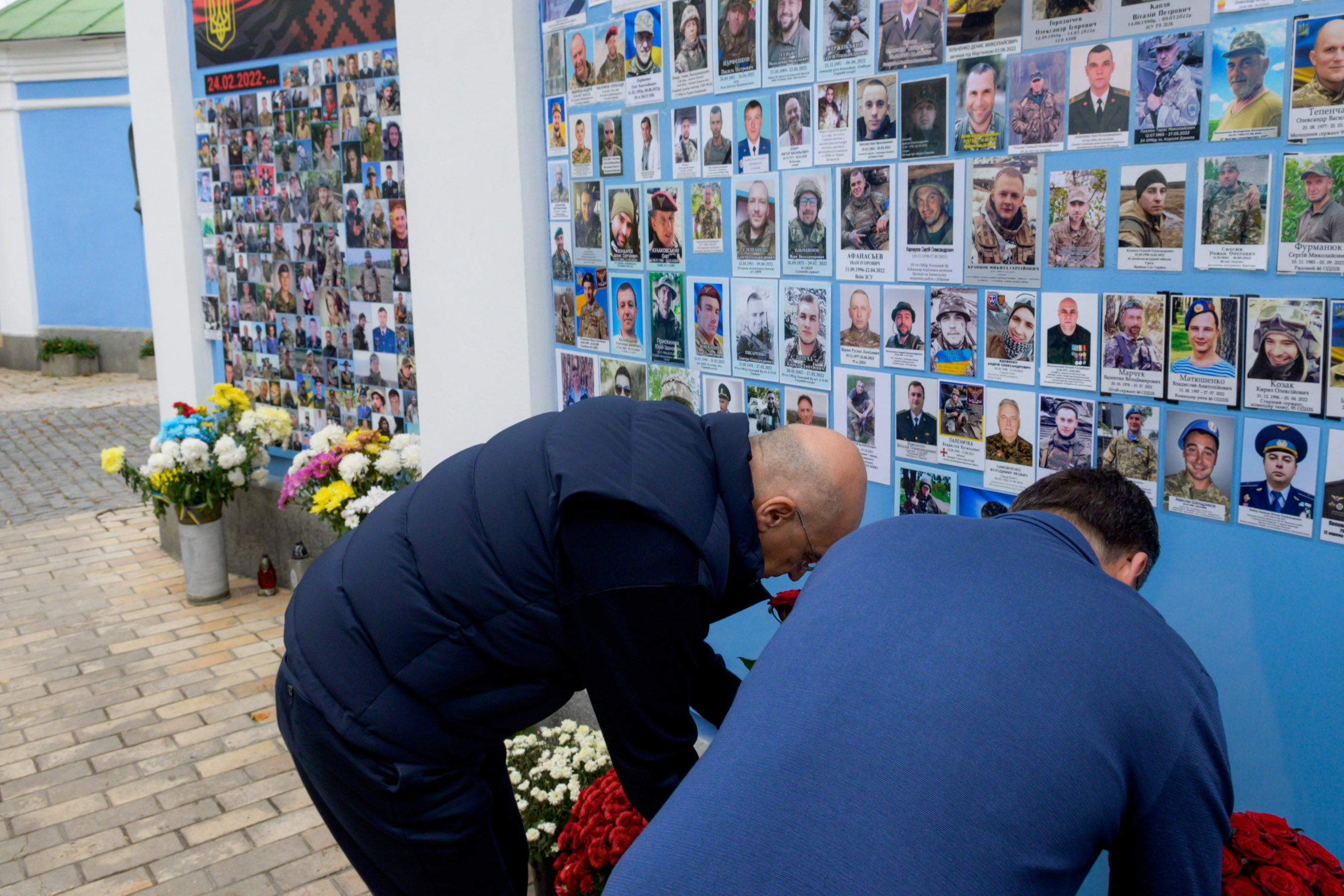
Wall of Remembrance of Ukrainian soldiers killed in the Russo-Ukrainian War

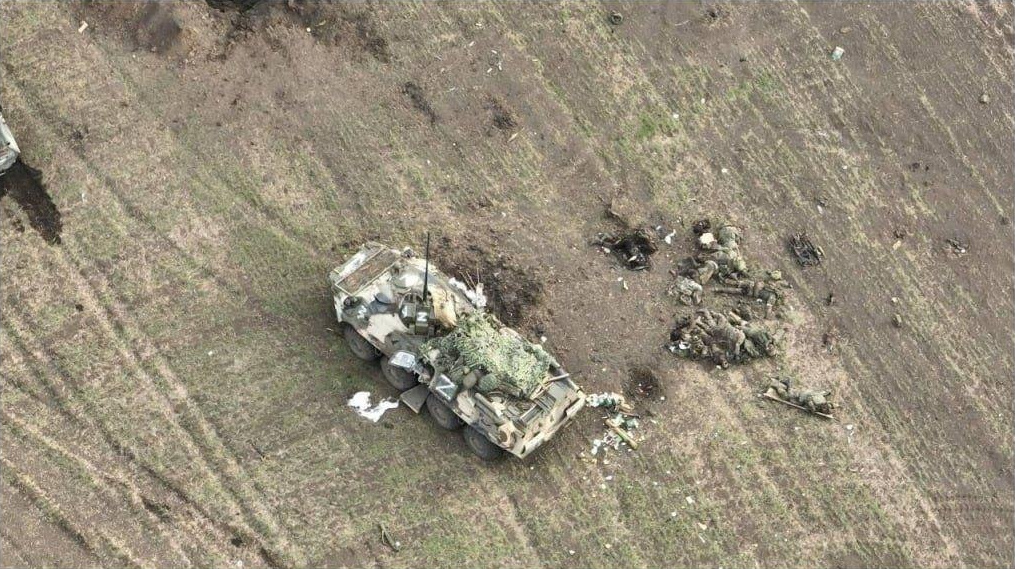
Russian military casualties next to a Z marked armoured vehicle

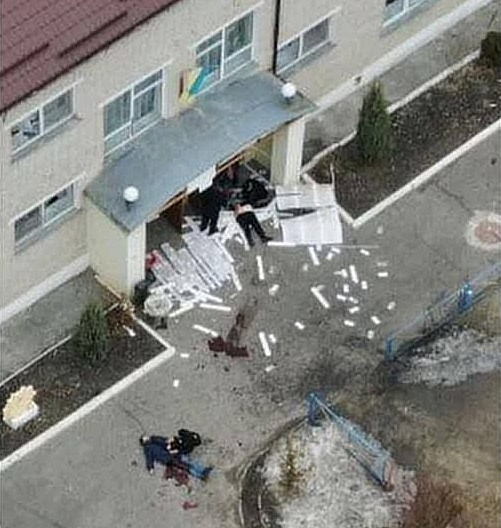
Casualties after two shells hit a two-storey building of a kindergarten in Okhtyrka, Ukraine, causing about 50 people to be hospitalised

Russian and Ukrainian sources have both been said to inflate opposing casualty numbers and downplay their own losses for morale. Leaked US documents say "under-reporting of casualties within the [Russian] system highlights the military's 'continuing reluctance' to convey bad news up the chain of command." Russian news outlets have largely stopped reporting the Russian death toll. Russia and Ukraine have admitted suffering "significant" and "considerable" losses, respectively.

The numbers of civilian and military deaths have been impossible to determine precisely. Agence France-Presse (AFP) reported that neither it nor independent conflict monitors could verify Russian and Ukrainian claims of enemy losses and suspected they were inflated. In October 2022, the independent Russian media project iStories, citing sources close to the Kremlin, reported that more than 90,000 Russian soldiers had been killed, seriously wounded, or gone missing. Ukrainian president Volodymyr Zelenskyy stated in February 2026 that approximately 55,000 Ukrainian soldiers had been killed on the battlefield, noting that a significant number were also officially listed as missing in action. By November 2026, leaked data from Rosstat indicated that 400,000 Russian soldiers had been killed, at least one percent of Russian men aged 18–60.

While combat deaths can be inferred from a variety of sources, including satellite imagery of military action, measuring civilian deaths is more difficult. In June 2022, the Ukrainian Minister of Defence said that tens of thousands of Ukrainians had died, and he hoped the death toll was below 100,000. By July 2024, about 20,000 Ukrainians had lost limbs. In Mariupol, the mayor said over 10,000 and possibly as many as 20,000 civilians died in the siege of Mariupol and Russian forces had brought mobile cremation equipment when they entered the city. An investigation by AP from the end of 2022 estimated up to 75,000 killed civilians in the Mariupol area alone. There were at least 8,000 excess deaths in Mariupol between March 2022 and February 2023. The Office of the United Nations High Commissioner for Human Rights (OHCHR) believed the true civilian casualty numbers were significantly higher than it has been able to confirm.

In the Russian military, ethnic minorities have suffered disproportionately high casualties. In October 2022, the Russian regions with the highest death tolls were Dagestan, Tuva, and Buryatia, all minority regions. In February 2024, six out of ten Russian regions with the highest mortality rates in Ukraine were located in Siberia and the far east, and ethnic minorities' continuing outsized casualty rates prompted analysts to warn that the situation will lead to long-term destructive impacts on these communities. About 1,200 Russian soldiers were killed or wounded in Ukraine every day in May–June 2024, which climbed to 1,500 by November 2024, when 45,690 casualties were estimated. Newsweek estimated that on the bloodiest day in November 2024 the killed Russian men (1,950) exceeded the average daily male birth rate in Russia (1,836). Latvia-based news outlet Meduza estimated that up to 140,000 Russian soldiers had died by July 2024. In December 2025, an analysis by the BBC suggested that Russian casualties were growing at a faster rate than at any point previously in the invasion, with 40% more obituaries of soldiers being published in Russia in 2025 compared to 2024. The war in Ukraine and the associated emigration, lower birth rates, and war-related casualties has further deepened the demographic crisis of Russia.

The Russian invasion became the deadliest European war since World War II. In February 2025, the Quincy Institute for Responsible Statecraft estimated 250,000 dead. In September 2024, The Wall Street Journal reported that there were now one million Ukrainians and Russians who were killed or wounded.

Confirmed casualties
	Numbers	Time period	Source
Ukrainian civilians	16,874 killed, 51,273 wounded (Note: At least 176 foreign civilians from 25 countries are confirmed to have been killed within Ukraine. See table here for a detailed breakdown of deaths by nationalities.)	24 February 2022 – 13 August 2026	United Nations (OHCHR)
Russian civilians	1,716 killed (excluding annexed territories)	24 February 2022 – 2 September 2026	Novaya Gazeta Europe
Ukrainian forces	103,418 killed (incl. non-combat), 97,938 missing, 11,618 captured (conf. by names)	24 February 2022 – 4 September 2026	UALosses project
Russian forces (DPR/LPR excluded)	287,831 killed (conf. by names)	24 February 2022 – 13 November 2026	BBC News Russian and Mediazona
Russian forces (Donetsk & Luhansk PR)	21,000–23,500 killed	24 February 2022 – 30 September 2024	BBC News Russian

Estimated and claimed casualties
	Numbers	Time period	Source
Ukrainian civilians	12,000 killed (confirmed), (Note: See here for a detailed breakdown of civilian deaths by oblast, according to Ukrainian authorities.); 16,000+ captive (Note: Some civilians have been reported to have died in captivity in Russia, like journalist Victoria Roshchyna.)	24 February 2022 – 17 June 2024; 24 February 2022 – 16 December 2024	Ukraine
Ukrainian civilians	2,883 killed, 8,260 wounded (in DPR/LPR areas)	17 February 2022 – 22 December 2024	DPR (Note: The DPR stated 1,799 of its civilians were killed and 6,902 wounded in its territories between 1 January 2022 and 22 December 2024, of which 8 died and 23 were wounded between 1 January and 25 February 2022, leaving a total of 1,791 killed and 6,879 wounded in the period of the Russian invasion.) and LPR
Russian civilians	621 killed (including Crimea), 789 missing	24 February 2022 – 19 May 2025	Russia
Ukrainian forces	80,000 killed, 400,000 wounded	24 February 2022 – before September 2024	WSJ citing confidential Ukrainian estimate
Ukrainian forces	60,000–100,000 killed, 400,000 wounded	24 February 2022 – 26 November 2024	The Economist estimate
Ukrainian forces	55,000 killed, 380,000 wounded, 56,700 missing, (Note: 63,000 missing as of 17 February 2025. 90 percent of which were thought to be soldiers, which would be around 56,700.); 8,000 captured	24 February 2022 – 6 March 2025; 24 February 2022 – 17 February 2025; 24 February 2022 – 30 October 2024	Ukraine
Russian forces	1,140,000 killed and wounded	24 February 2022 – 5 November 2025	UK MoD estimate
Russian forces	412,576 killed	24 February 2022 – 28 August 2026	Leaked Rosstat register
Russian forces	539,224–656,884 killed	24 February 2022 – 30 October 2026	BBC News Russian estimate
Russian forces	1,505,380+ killed and wounded, 60,000 missing	24 February 2022 – 12 September 2026; 24 February 2022 – 4 February 2025	Ukrainian MoD estimate Government of Ukraine
DPRK forces	2,300 killed, 2 captured (Note: In addition, Ukraine claimed six North Korean soldiers were killed in a missile strike in early October 2024, while fighting alongside Russian forces. South Korea's Defense Minister said of this report it was "highly likely" true. However, Russia denied the reports.)	December 2024 – March 2026	BBC News

== War crimes and attacks on civilians ==
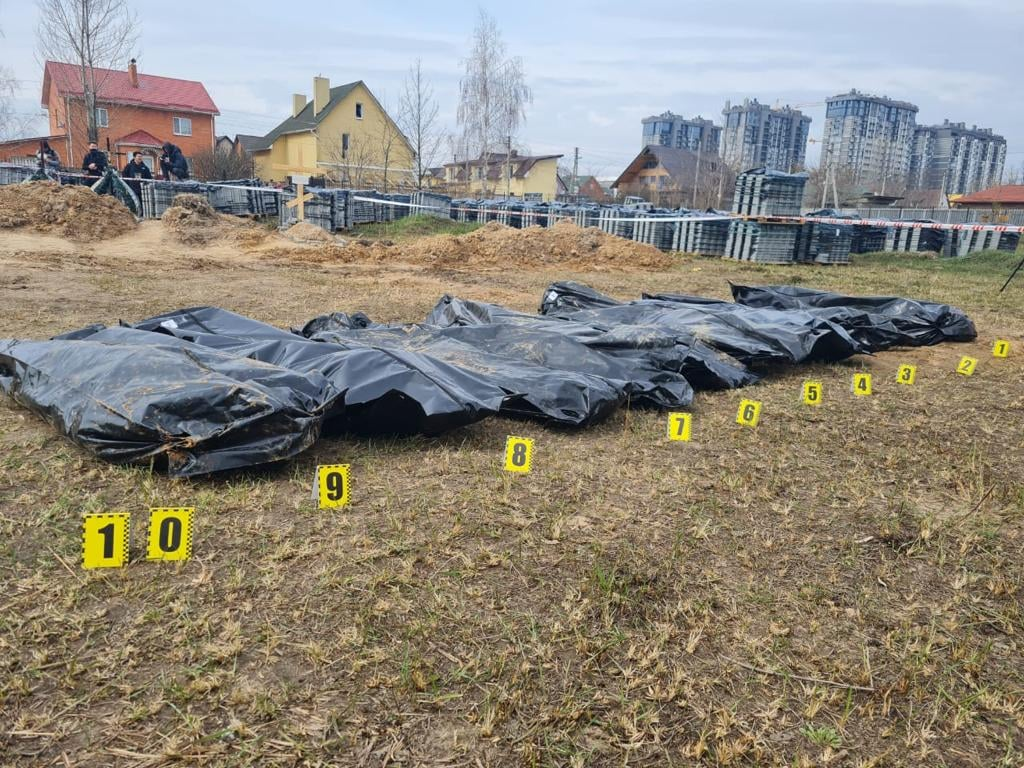
Dead bodies following the Bucha massacre by Russian troops

The Russian military and authorities have been responsible for deliberate attacks against civilian targets (including strikes on hospitals and on the energy grid), massacres of civilians, abduction and torture of civilians, sexual violence, forced deportation of civilians, and torture and murder of Ukrainian prisoners of war. They have also carried out indiscriminate attacks in densely populated areas, including with cluster bombs, in one instance killing 61 people in the Kramatorsk railway station attack. According to Kyrylo Budanov, the chief of Ukrainian intelligence, Russia, before the start of the invasion, had created 'execution lists' of Ukrainian teachers, journalists, scientists, writers, priests, and politicians and was preparing for a genocide of Ukrainians; the plans included locations of mass graves and mobile crematoria.

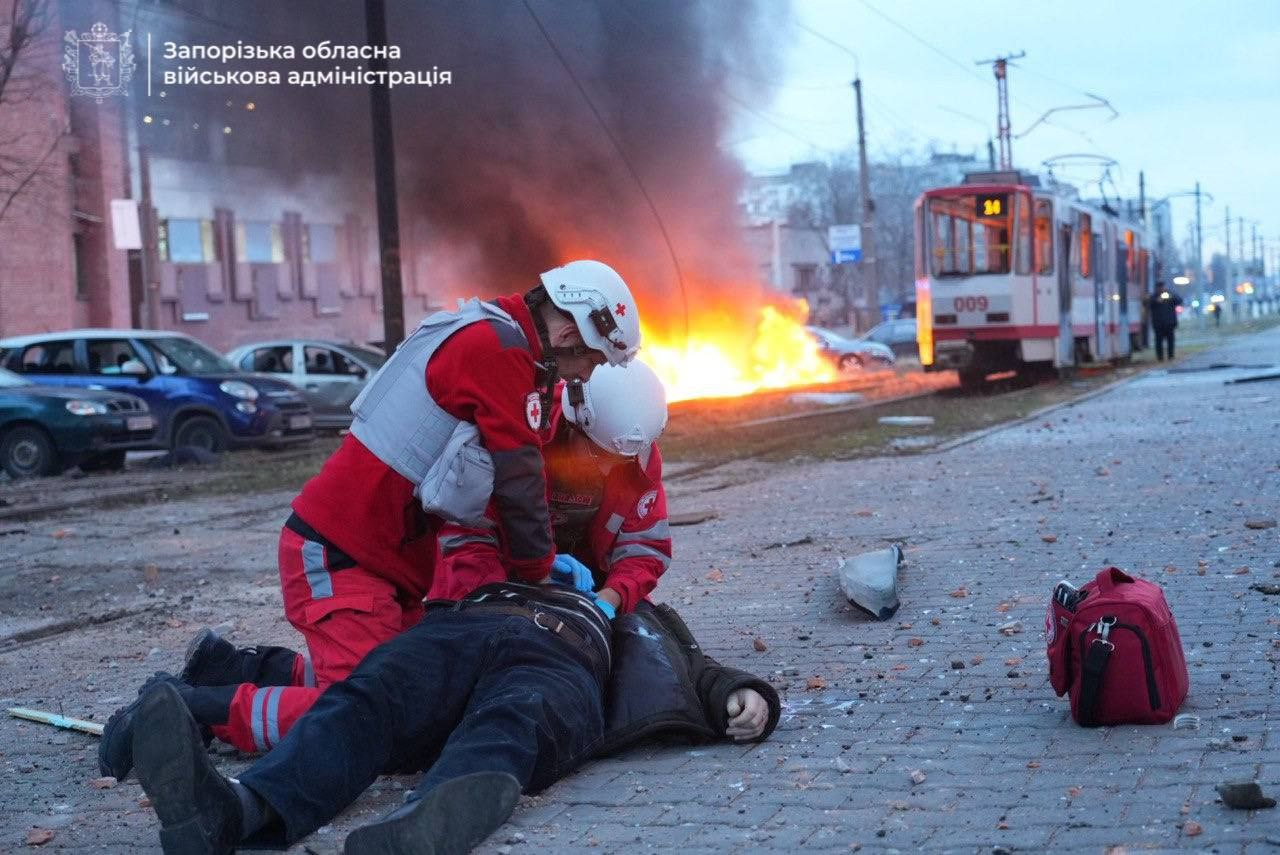
Aftermath of a Russian airstrike on Zaporizhzhia on 8 January 2025, which killed 13 people and wounded many more

According to the United Nations' Human Rights Office (OHCHR), by December 2023, about 78% of confirmed civilian casualties had been killed in Ukrainian-held territory. Over 12,300 civilians have been killed since the invasion began. Russia has deliberately and repeatedly attacked Ukrainian civilians with FPV drones, including first responders, such as in the Kherson terror campaign dubbed the "human safari." In October 2025, the UN concluded that the Russian military was systematically attacking Ukrainian civilians and civilian targets with drones along a 300-kilometre stretch of the Dnipro River to drive Ukrainians out of the region. The report said that these are war crimes and crimes against humanity.

The UN Human Rights Office reports that Russia is committing severe human rights violations in occupied Ukraine, including arbitrary detentions; enforced disappearances; torture; crackdown on protests and freedom of speech; enforced Russification; indoctrination of children, and suppression of Ukrainian language and culture. The UN also found that Russian authorities were systematically deporting Ukrainian civilians from occupied provinces, which is a crime against humanity. Ukrainians have been coerced into taking Russian passports and becoming Russian citizens. Those who refuse are denied healthcare and other rights, and can be imprisoned as a "foreign citizen." Ukrainian men who take Russian citizenship are drafted to fight against Ukraine.

Russian forces have reportedly used banned chemical weapons, usually tear gas grenades. In April 2024, a Daily Telegraph investigation concluded that "Russian troops are carrying out a systematic campaign of illegal chemical attacks against Ukrainian soldiers".

In January 2026, the UN reported that 2025 had been the deadliest year for Ukrainian civilians since 2022, with 2,514 deaths and 12,142 injuries being verified during the year, a 31% increase compared to 2024. The report said that a "massive increase" of Russian long-range weapons was causing increased harm in urban centres.

=== Prisoners of war ===
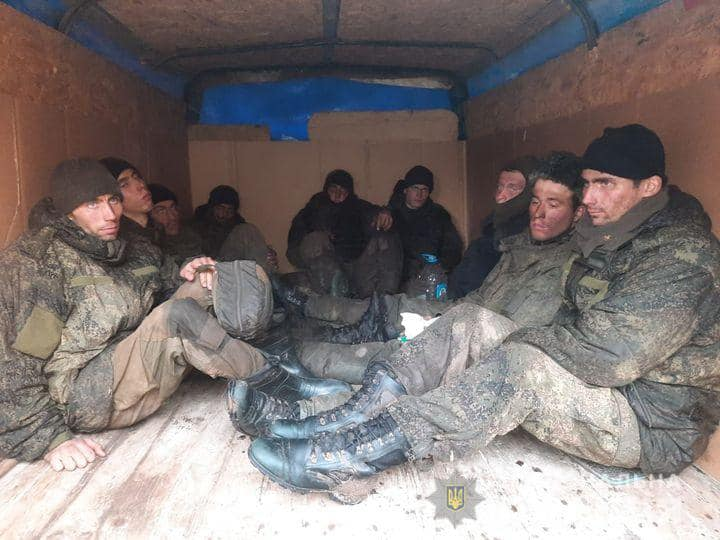
Russian soldiers captured during the Battle of Sumy

An August 2022 report by the Humanitarian Research Lab of the Yale School of Public Health identified 21 filtration camps for Ukrainian "civilians, POWs [prisoners of war], and other personnel" in the vicinity of the Donetsk oblast. Imaging of one camp, Olenivka prison, found two sites of disturbed earth consistent with "potential graves." Kaveh Khoshnood, a professor at the Yale School of Public Health, said: "Incommunicado detention of civilians is more than a violation of international humanitarian law—it represents a threat to the public health of those currently in the custody of Russia and its proxies." Conditions described by freed prisoners include exposure, insufficient access to sanitation, food, and water; cramped conditions; electrical shocks; and assault.

An OHCHR report released in November 2022 documented abuses on both sides, based on interviews with prisoners. In March 2023, UN human rights commissioner Volker Türk reported that more than 90% of the Ukrainian POWs interviewed by his office said they had been tortured or ill-treated in penitentiary facilities, which Russia, despite several requests, did not give UN staff access to.

In April 2023, several videos circulated on different websites purportedly showing Russian soldiers beheading Ukrainian soldiers.

In March 2024, the UN issued a report saying Russia may have executed more than 30 recently captured Ukrainian POWs over the winter. The UN Human Rights Office verified three incidents in which Russian servicemen executed seven Ukrainian servicemen. According to the same report, 39 of 60 released Ukrainian POWs said that they had been subjected to sexual violence during their internment.

In October 2024, the EEAS described an increasing frequency of Russian executions of Ukrainian prisoners, with at least 177 prisoners dying in Russian captivity since the beginning of the war. The statement included the OHCHR's confirmation of systematic use of different methods of torture used by Russians against Ukrainian prisoners.

The Ukrainian Armed Forces have been accused of executions and abuses of Russian POWs, but the number of allegations has been significantly lower.

=== Abduction of Ukrainian children ===
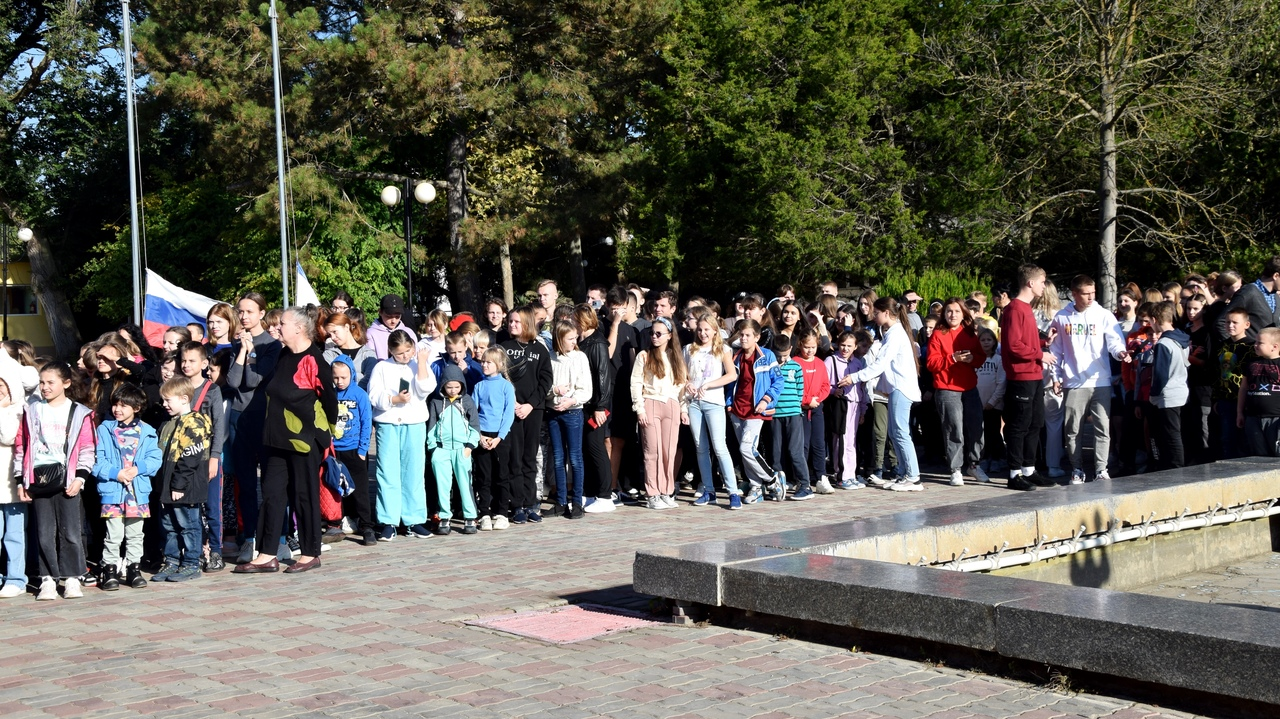
Ukrainian children from Kherson and Zaporizhzhia oblasts at Yevpatoria, Russian-occupied Crimea, October 2022

In June 2024, an investigation by the Financial Times identified four Ukrainian children on a Russian government-linked adoption website who had been abducted from state care homes. The children's Ukrainian background was not mentioned. One child was shown with a new Russian name and an age that differed from their Ukrainian documents, while another was shown using a Russian version of their Ukrainian name. 17 other matches identified by the Financial Times on the adoption website were confirmed as Ukrainian children in a New York Times investigation. Ukrainian authorities estimate that nearly 20,000 Ukrainian children have been forcibly taken from occupied territories to Russia since the full-scale invasion began. Wayne Jordash, president of humanitarian law firm Global Rights Compliance, described forcibly transferring or deporting children as war crimes, adding that when done as part of a widespread or systematic attack on a civilian population, Russia is also committing crimes against humanity.

A March 2025 report published by the ISW suggests that the mass transfer of Ukrainian children to Russia had been an established component of Russia's war plans prior to the invasion. It references Russian governmental documents that predate the invasion, which outlined plans to move Ukrainian orphans in occupied Ukraine to Russia, described as 'humanitarian evacuations.' Since the invasion, tens to hundreds of thousands of Ukrainian children have been deported to Russia, where they have been housed in camps, placed with adoptive families, and provided with new Russian identities, including new names, falsified birth certificates, and other state documentation. The report claims that Russia intends to convert the abductees into 'the next generation of Russians' while 'depriving [Ukraine] of its multi-generation potential.' Referencing Article 2 of the Genocide Convention, the author notes that 'international law explicitly forbids the forcible transfer of children from one group to another group for the purpose of destroying, in whole or in part, a national or ethnic group and considers these violations as constituent acts of genocide.'

In August 2025, Mykola Kuleba, the head of a Ukrainian NGO, said that Russian occupation authorities in Ukraine had created an online "catalog" of Ukrainian children up for adoption sorted by physical traits, denouncing the practice as child trafficking.

=== International arrest warrants ===
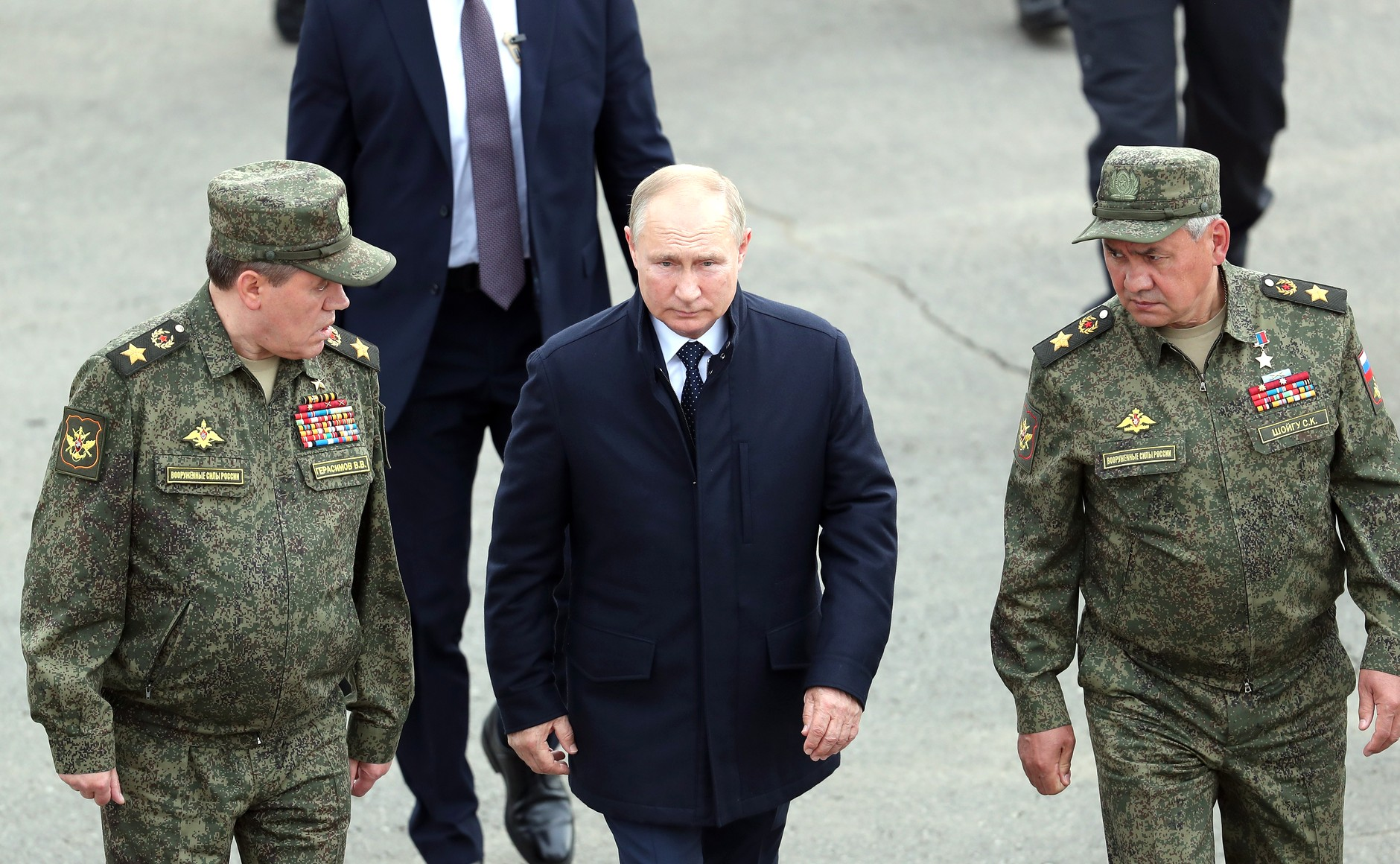
Three of the indicted individuals (left to right): Valery Gerasimov, Vladimir Putin and Sergei Shoigu

The International Criminal Court (ICC) opened an investigation into possible crimes against humanity, genocide, and war crimes committed in Ukraine. On 17 March 2023, the ICC issued a warrant for Putin's arrest, charging him with individual criminal responsibility in the abduction of children forcibly deported to Russia. It was the first time that the ICC had issued an arrest warrant for the head of state of a permanent member of the United Nations Security Council (the world's five principal nuclear powers). Moscow has denied any involvement in war crimes, a response Vittorio Bufacchi of University College Cork says "has bordered on the farcical", and its contention that the images coming out of Bucha were fabricated is "a disingenuous response born by delusional hubris, post-truth on overdrive, (that) does not merit being taken seriously." Even the usually fractured United States Senate came together to call Putin a war criminal.

One of several efforts to document Russian war crimes concerns its repeated bombardment of markets and bread lines, destruction of basic infrastructure, and attacks on exports and supply convoys in a country where deliberate starvation of Ukrainians by Soviets still looms large in public memory. Forcible deportation of populations, such as took place in Mariupol, is another area of focus.

In March 2024, the ICC issued arrest warrants for military officials Sergey Kobylash, Viktor Sokolov, Sergei Shoigu, and Valery Gerasimov. In May 2026, a special tribunal was formalized by 36 countries to prosecute Putin for the crime of aggression against Ukraine.

== Impacts ==
=== Humanitarian impact ===
The invasion contributed to the 2022 food crises. As of February 2025, 3.7 million Ukrainians were internally displaced and 6.9 million were refugees.

Russian attacks on civilians, causing mass civilian casualties and displacement, have been characterised as genocide and democide. In September 2023, a UN-mandated investigative body reported that Russian occupiers had tortured Ukrainians to death and forced families to listen as they raped women. The commission previously found that violations committed by Russian forces in Ukraine may constitute crimes against humanity.

By August 2024, the WHO had recorded 1,940 attacks against Ukrainian healthcare and reported widespread double-tap attacks. In 2023, Physicians for Human Rights described Russian attacks on Ukraine's healthcare system as having a "reasonable basis" to be considered war crimes, and potentially constitute crimes against humanity.

==== Cultural heritage ====
As of August 2025, UNESCO has verified damage to 508 Ukrainian cultural sites, including 151 religious sites, 34 museums, 33 monuments, and 18 libraries. In 2022, the European Parliament labelled Russia's destruction of Ukrainian cultural property a war crime. Ukraine's Minister of Culture Oleksandr Tkachenko called it cultural genocide.

The documentary film 20 Days in Mariupol won the Oscar for best documentary in 2024.

=== Refugee crisis ===
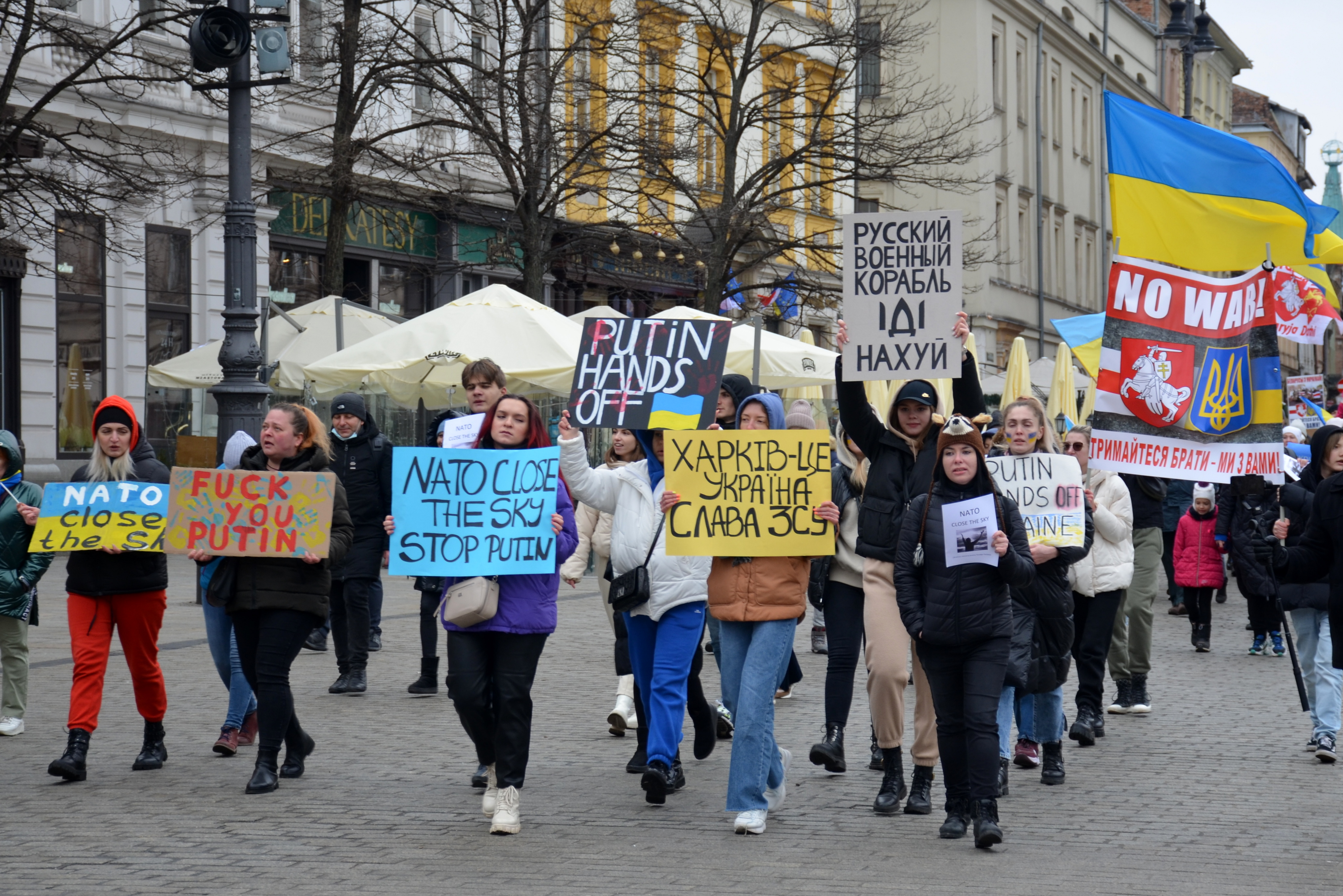
Ukrainian refugees in Kraków protesting against the war, 6 March 2022

The war has caused the largest refugee and humanitarian crisis in Europe since World War II. In the first week of the invasion, the UN reported over a million refugees had fled Ukraine; this reached over eight million by February 2023. In May 2022, following an influx of military equipment into Ukraine, a significant number of refugees sought to return to regions relatively isolated from the front in southeastern Ukraine. By 3 May, another 8 million people were displaced inside Ukraine.

Most refugees were women, children, elderly, or disabled. Most male Ukrainian nationals aged 18 to 60 were denied exit from Ukraine as part of mandatory conscription, unless they were responsible for the financial support of three or more children, were single fathers, or were the parent/guardian of children with disabilities. Many Ukrainian men, including teenagers, opted to remain in Ukraine voluntarily to join the resistance.

According to the UN High Commission for Refugees as of May 2022, there were 3,315,711 refugees in Poland, 901,696 in Romania, 594,664 in Hungary, 461,742 in Moldova, 415,402 in Slovakia, and 27,308 in Belarus, while Russia reported it had received over 800,104 refugees. By July 2022, over 390,000 Ukrainian refugees had arrived in the Czech Republic. Turkey registered more than 58,000 Ukrainian refugees as of March 2022. The EU invoked the Temporary Protection Directive for the first time, granting Ukrainian refugees the right to live and work in the EU for up to three years. Britain has accepted 146,379 refugees, as well as extending the ability to remain in the UK for three years. Flight from war affected especially the southern and eastern regions and especially educated women of childbearing age and their children. With an estimate of more than 20% of refugees not returning, study author Maryna Tverdostup concluded that long-term shrinking will significantly impair reconstruction.

According to the OSCE, Russia has engaged in "massive deportation" of over 1.3 million Ukrainian civilians, potentially constituting crimes against humanity. The OSCE and Ukraine have accused Russia of forcibly moving civilians to filtration camps in Russian-held territory and then into Russia. Ukrainian sources have compared this policy to Soviet-era population transfers and Russian actions in the Chechen War of Independence. For instance, as of April 2022, Russia claimed to have evacuated about 121,000 Mariupol residents to Russia. RIA Novosti and Ukrainian officials said that thousands were dispatched to centres in cities in Russia and Russian-occupied Ukraine, from which people were sent to economically depressed regions of Russia. (Note: Most likely, new cities meant new industrial cities in Siberia, the construction plans of which were announced by Shoigu in the fall of 2021.)

=== Environmental impact ===
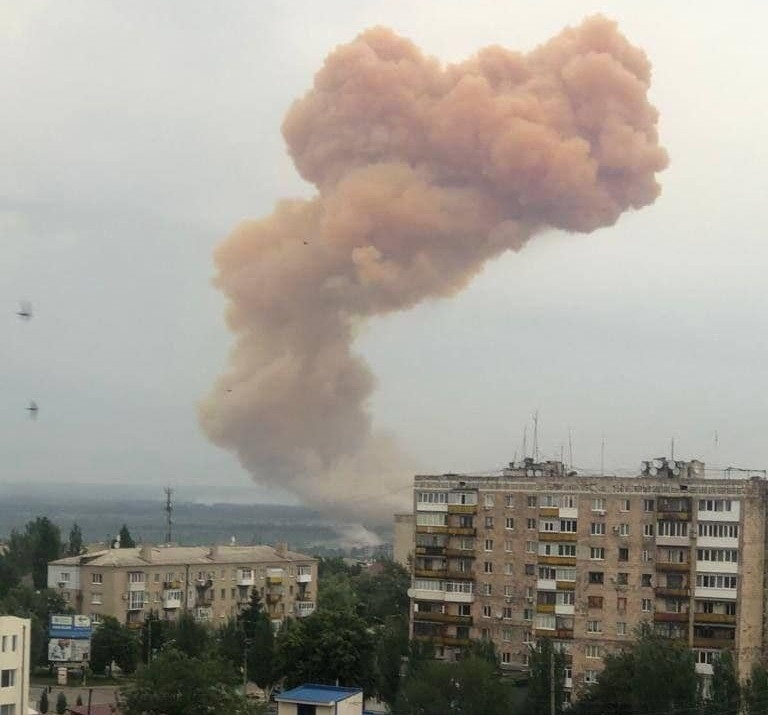
An explosion due to the shelling of a tank of nitric acid during the battle of Sievierodonetsk, 31 May 2022

Based on a preliminary assessment, the war has inflicted $51 billion in environmental damage in Ukraine; according to a report by the Yale School of the Environment, 623,000 tonnes (1.4 billion pounds) of petrochemicals have burnt as a result of shelling, while nearly 1,500 tonnes (3.2 million pounds) of pollutants have leaked into bodies of water. Hazardous chemicals have contaminated around 28 hectares (70 acres) of soil and likely made agricultural activities temporarily impossible. Around 30% of Ukraine's land is littered with explosives, and more than 2.4 million hectares (5.9 million acres) of forest have been damaged.

According to peace organisation PAX, Russia's "deliberate targeting of industrial and energy infrastructure" has caused "severe" pollution, and explosive weapons have left "millions of tonnes" of contaminated debris in cities and towns. In June 2023, the Kakhovka Dam, under Russian occupation, was damaged, causing flooding and triggering warnings of an "ecological disaster".

The Ukrainian government, international observers, and journalists have described the damage as ecocide. The Ukrainian government is investigating more crimes against the environment and ecocide (a crime in Ukraine). Zelenskyy has met with prominent European figures (Heidi Hautala, Margot Wallstrom, Mary Robinson, and Greta Thunberg) to discuss the environmental damage and how to prosecute it.

According to an investigation by NGL Media published in April 2024, Russia has completely destroyed over 60,000 hectares (150,000 acres) of Ukrainian forests. The investigation stated that long-term ecological consequences may include lowering of the groundwater level, reduction of biodiversity, worsening of air quality, fire outbreaks, and rivers and ponds drying up.

The war in Ukraine has severely disrupted global climate policy and increased CO_{2} emissions. The effects have been strongly felt in Asia, Europe, and the US.

==== Nuclear risk ====
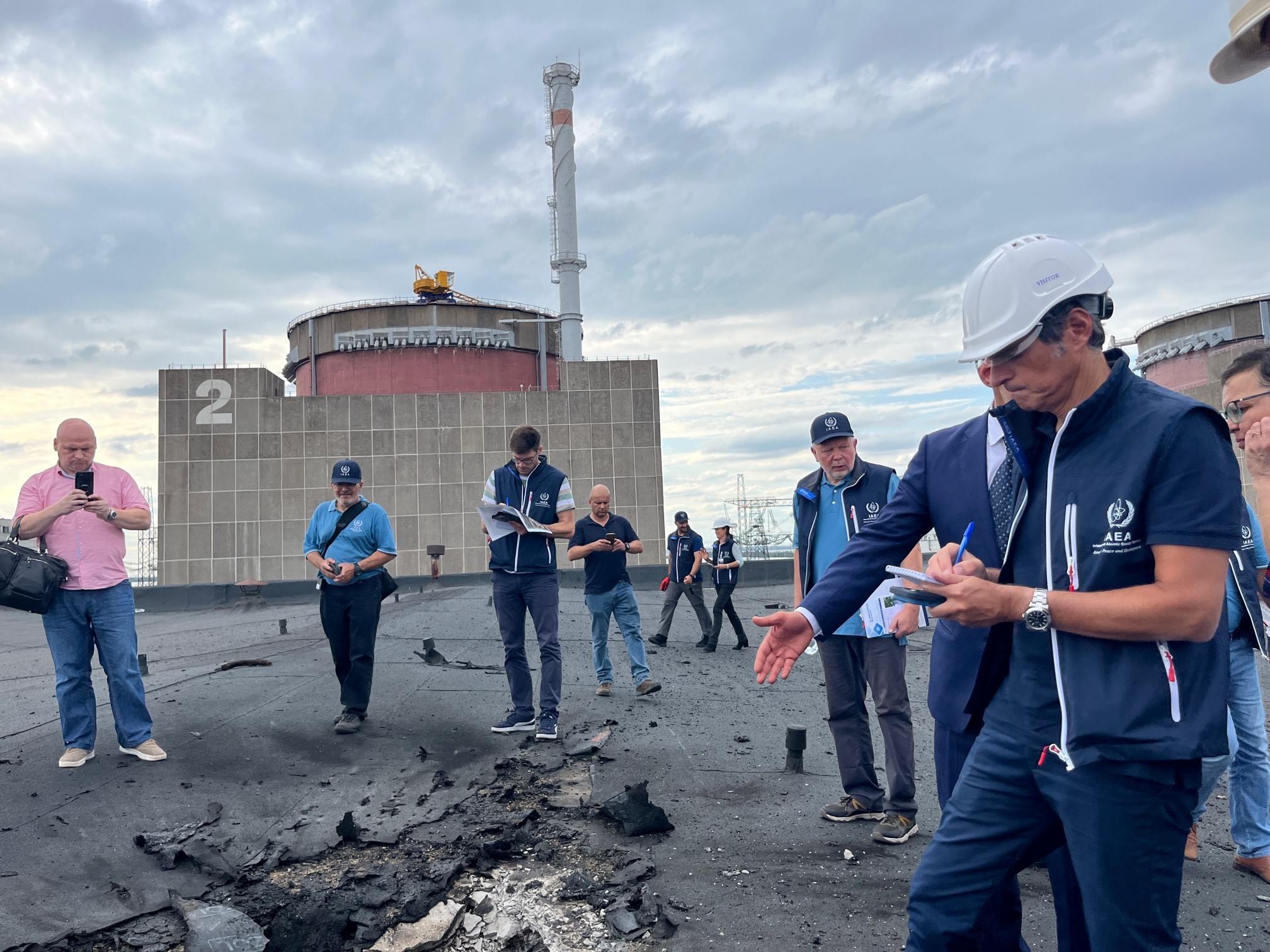
IAEA inspectors recording damage at Zaporizhzhia NPP

The invasion had an impact on Ukraine's nuclear power plants. Russian forces captured Chernobyl on the first day, leading to a huge spike in radiation levels due to disturbed radioactive soil in the Red Forest. At least one Russian soldier was reported to have died from radiation exposure. Russia also captured the Zaporizhzhia Nuclear Power Plant, the largest in Europe, which has since been at risk and damaged by shelling. In August 2022, Zelenskyy described the situation as "Russian nuclear terror." The International Atomic Energy Agency said it was the first time a military conflict occurred amid nuclear plants, and it called for a demilitarised zone around Zaporizhzhia NPP.

=== Economic impact ===
Viewed in context, the price of oil has been affected internationally at the times of the COVID-19 pandemic, the 2022 Russo-Ukrainian war and the 2026 Iran war.

==== Ukraine ====
Ukrainian Minister of Economic Development and Trade Yulia Svyrydenko announced that for 2022 Ukraine had a 30% loss in gross domestic product (GDP). The International Monetary Fund predicted that Ukraine's GDP would decrease between 10% and 35%; the European Bank for Reconstruction and Development predicted a 20% decrease. The Ukrainian statistics service said that the GDP of Ukraine in 2023 grew by 5.3%. By 2026 the World Bank estimated the cost of rebuilding Ukraine at US$588 billion.

Ukraine began issuing war bonds on 1 March 2022, and the following day the Ukrainian government announced that they had raised 6.14 billion hryvnias. In May 2022 the European Commission banned grain sales in Bulgaria, Poland, Hungary, Romania and Slovakia, except if they were transiting through those countries; the ban was lifted in September 2023.

The war has caused a major humanitarian crisis in Ukraine: the United Nations Development Programme calculated in March 2022 that a prolonged conflict would cause 30% of the Ukrainian population to fall below the poverty line, while 62% would be at risk of falling into poverty within a year.

Ukraine is home to substantial mineral, fossil-fuel, and agricultural resources, the capture of which analysts believe was a potential Russian motivation. Joint exploitation of Ukrainian mineral resources was subsequently the subject of the Ukraine–United States Mineral Resources Agreement.

==== Russia ====
The US government estimated that Russia's economic losses from the war and Western sanctions would be around $1.3 trillion by 2025, and Russia's direct financial spending on the invasion is estimated at $250 billion (as of late 2024). Other estimates put the direct cost of the war to Russia at over US$450 billion. The international sanctions led Russia to become heavily economically and technologically dependent on China.

The Russian Ministry of Economic Development said that for 2022 the GDP contracted by 2.1% and for 2023 Russia's government said the GDP grew by 3.6%. In April 2024, it was reported that Russia was planning tax increases to help finance the war. In January 2025, it was reported that, since early 2022, Russia had used a two-prong strategy to finance the war. In addition to the official Russian government defence budget—direct financial expenditure for the war was estimated at US$250 billion through June 2024 for military spending through normal channels, with the military budget rising to over 20% of annual GDP—an additional off-budget financing mechanism was employed with over US$200 billion of debt funding obtained from preferential bank loans to defence contractors and war-related businesses, compelled by the Russian government.

A report in April 2025 by the Stockholm Institute of Transition Economics noted that official Russian statistics are unreliable. The report argued that Russian fiscal stimulus has kept the economy afloat so far but that it is on an unsustainable trajectory. In August 2025, VEB, one of the largest Russian state banks, assessed that the Russian economy had started slipping into recession. In April 2026, Putin said Russia's GDP shrank by a combined 1.8% in January and February; according to Fortune, Russian officials warned Putin earlier in the year about a possible financial crisis due to "spiraling" inflation.

A price cap was placed on Russian oil by the G7 in December 2022. The US banned all imports of Russian oil in March 2022. The EU placed an embargo on oil products from Russia in February 2023. Other countries that embargoed Russian oil included Canada, the United Kingdom, Australia, and New Zealand.

== Peace efforts ==
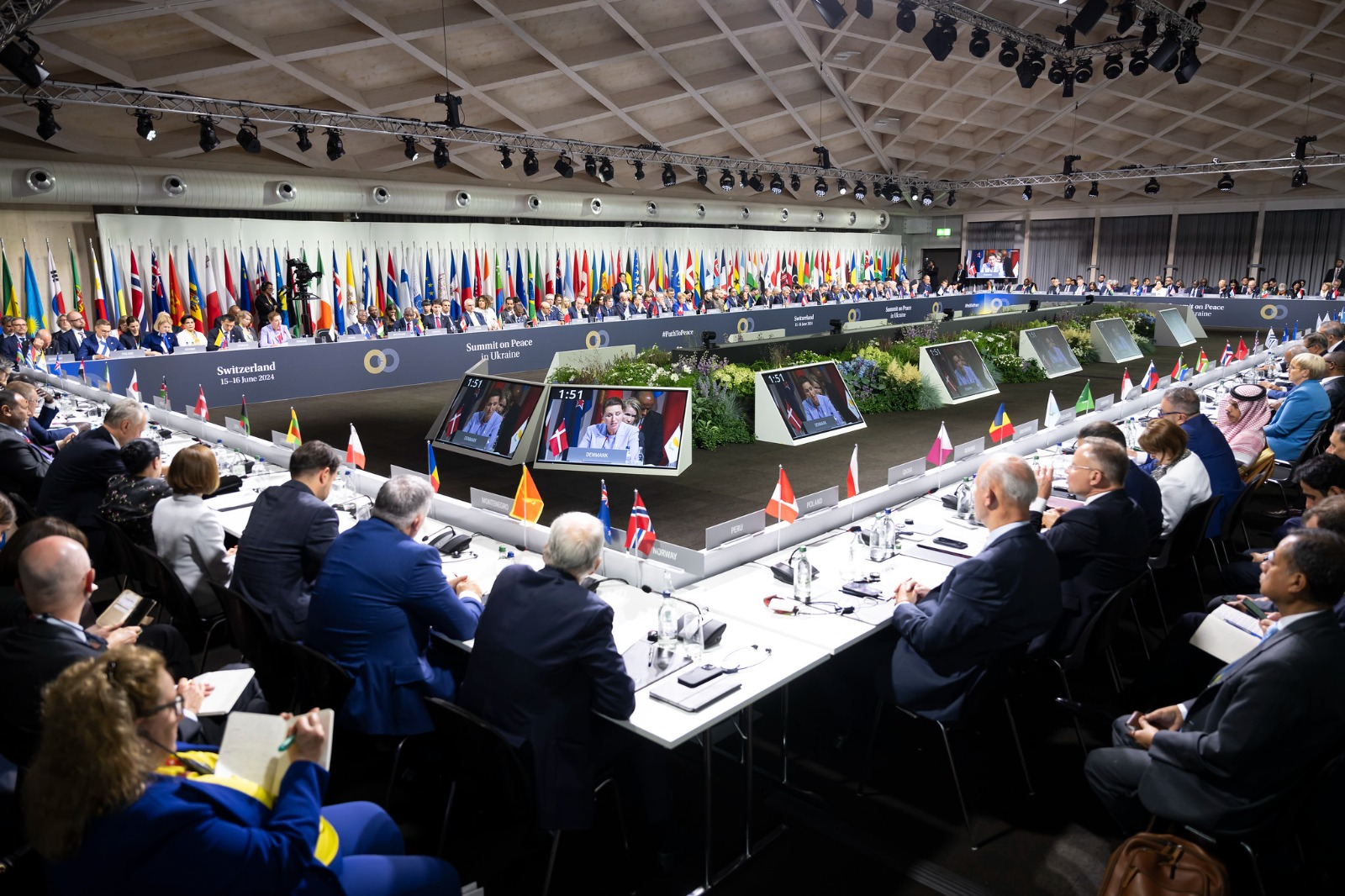
Attendees at the June 2024 Ukraine peace summit

Peace negotiations between Russia and Ukraine took place on 28 February, 3 March, and 7 March 2022 in Belarus. Further talks were held on 10 March and 14 March in Turkey. Peace negotiations in Istanbul, Turkey, began on 29 March 2022 and ended without agreement.

Putin has demanded international recognition of the annexed provinces (pictured) as Russian, despite only controlling parts of them.

Since 2024, Ukraine's main peace terms are that Russia withdraw its troops; that Ukrainian prisoners be released; Russian leaders be prosecuted for war crimes; and Ukraine be given security guarantees. Russia's main terms are that Russia must keep all the land it occupies, that it be given all of the provinces that it claims but does not fully control, that Ukraine end plans to join NATO, and that sanctions against Russia be lifted. According to Western analysts, allowing Russia to keep the land it seized would "reward the aggressor while punishing the victim" and set a dangerous precedent. They predicted this would encourage Russia "to continue its imperialist campaign of expansionism," and embolden other expansionist regimes.

After Donald Trump became US president in 2025, there was a major shift in US policy. The Trump administration began negotiations with Russia and separately with Ukraine. In February 2025, the US twice sided with Russia in UN resolutions, opposing a European-drafted resolution condemning Russia's actions and supporting the territorial integrity of Ukraine and then drafting and voting for a UN Security Council resolution calling for the end of the conflict but containing no criticism of Russia.

Since March 2025, Ukraine has accepted a proposal for a 30-day unconditional ceasefire, which is supported by the US and European allies. Russia has rejected calls for a ceasefire. In November 2025, Trump adopted a 28-point peace plan, interpreted as broadly pro-Russian, and, according to The Insider, at its core a recycled Russian document substantially written by Kirill Dmitriev, a Kremlin operative. Ukraine, European allies and the US then produced revised versions. These were rejected by the Russians.

== International reactions ==
UN General Assembly Resolution ES-11/1 vote on 2 March 2022 condemning the invasion of Ukraine and demanding a complete withdrawal of Russian troops In favour (141) Against (5) Abstained (35) Absent (12) Non-member

The invasion received widespread international condemnation from governments and intergovernmental organisations. In March 2022 (ES-11/1) and February 2023 (ES-11/6), 141 member states of the UN General Assembly voted for a resolution that Russia should immediately withdraw. Seven, including Russia, opposed. Political reactions to the invasion included new sanctions on Russia, which triggered widespread effects on the Russian and world economies. As of July 2025, the EU had adopted 18 packages of sanctions against Russia and Belarus. Sanctions forced Russia to reorient its oil exports, rely more on LNG (which was not subject to EU sanctions), and shift its coal exports from Europe to Asia. Most European countries cancelled nuclear cooperation with Russia.

Over 70 countries and the EU delivered humanitarian aid to Ukraine, and nearly 50 countries plus the EU provided military aid. Economic sanctions included bans on Russian aircraft using EU airspace, certain Russian banks from the SWIFT payments system, and certain Russian media outlets. Reactions to the invasion have included peace efforts and the examination of the invasion's legality.

Demonstrations were held worldwide. Calls for a boycott of Russian goods spread on social media, while hackers attacked Russian websites. Anti-Russian sentiment against Russians living abroad surged. In March 2022, Russian president Putin introduced prison sentences of up to 15 years for publishing "fake news" about Russian military operations, intended to suppress any criticism related to the war.

Some countries, particularly in the Global South, saw public support for Russia, due in part to distrust of US foreign policy. According to the Economist Intelligence Unit, in 2023, 31% of the world's population lives in countries that are leaning towards or supportive of Russia, 30.7% live in neutral countries, and 36.2% live in countries that are against Russia in some way. Several parliaments passed resolutions declaring Russia to be a state sponsor of terrorism. By October 2022, Latvia, Lithuania, and Estonia had declared Russia a terrorist state. In August 2023, Iceland became the first European country to close its embassy in Russia as a result of the invasion.

The invasion prompted Ukraine, Finland, and Sweden to apply for NATO membership. Finland became a member in 2023, and Sweden in 2024.

== See also ==
- 2020s in military history
- Democracy in Europe
- Elections in Russia
- Elections in Ukraine
- List of armed conflicts between Russia and Ukraine
- List of conflicts in Europe
- List of conflicts in territory of the former Soviet Union
- List of interstate wars since 1945 – Post-1945 military conflicts over territory
- List of invasions in the 21st century
- List of ongoing armed conflicts
- List of residential strikes during the Russian invasion (May 2022)
- List of wars: 2020–present
- Red lines in the Russo-Ukrainian war – Veiled threats of engagement
- Russian emigration during the Russo-Ukrainian war (2022–present)

== Bibliography ==
- D'Anieri, Paul (31 October 2019). Ukraine and Russia: From Civilized Divorce to Uncivil War (1st ed.). Cambridge University Press. ISBN 978-1-108-48609-5 – via Google Books.
- Wallensteen, Peter (2023). Understanding Conflict Resolution. Los Angeles: SAGE. ISBN 978-1-5296-1320-9. OCLC 1370602224.
- G. Jones, Seth; McCabe, Riley (3 June 2025). "Russia's Battlefield Woes in Ukraine". CSIS.
