= Special forces =

Military units trained to conduct special operations

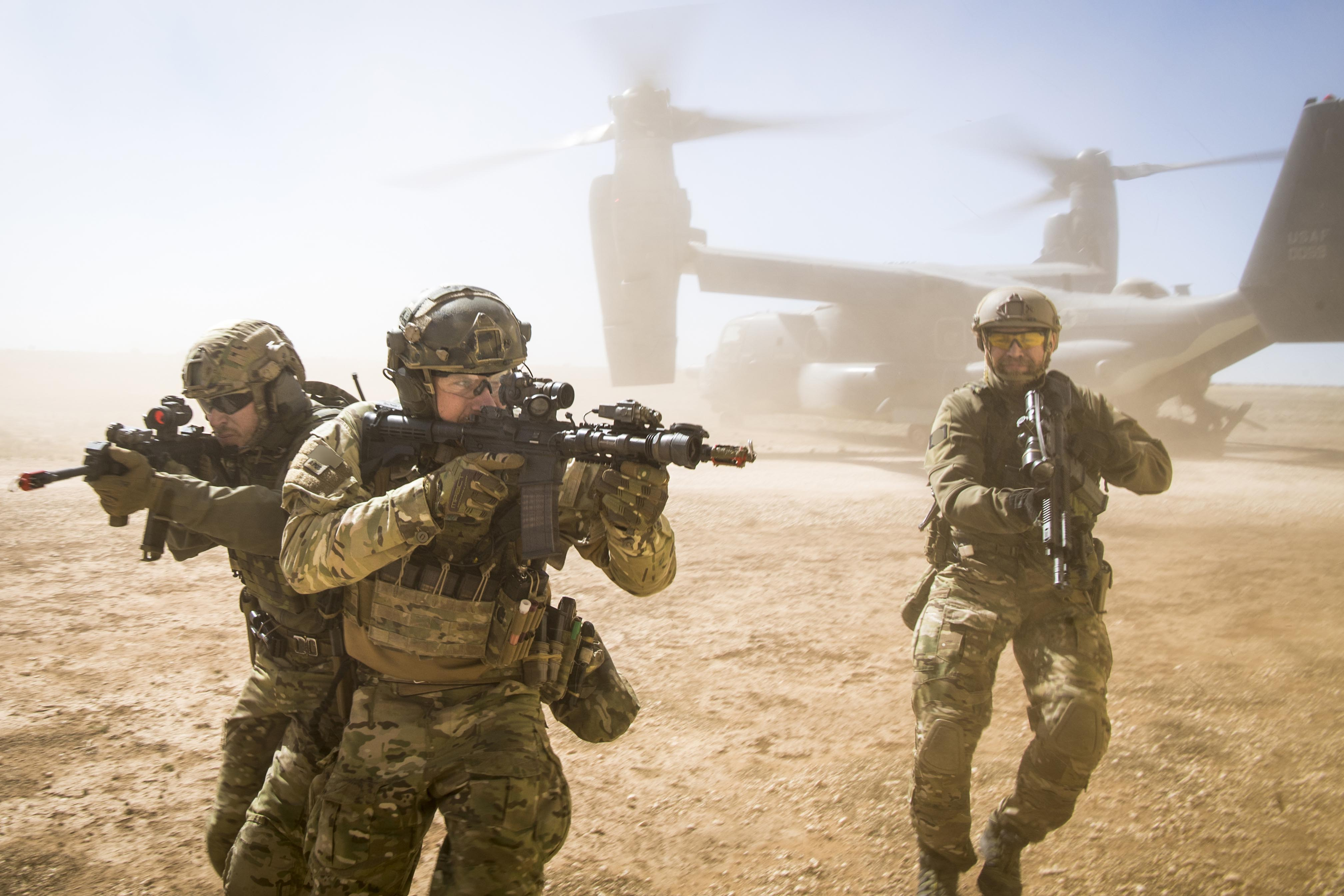
An American special forces team moves together out of a U.S. Air Force CV-22 Osprey aircraft on February 26, 2018

Special forces or special operations forces (SOF) are military units trained to conduct special operations. NATO has defined special operations as "military activities conducted by specially designated, organized, selected, trained and equipped forces using unconventional techniques and modes of employment".

Special forces emerged in the early 20th century, with a significant growth in the field during World War II, when "every major army involved in the fighting" created formations devoted to special operations behind enemy lines. Depending on the country, special forces may perform functions including airborne operations, counterinsurgency, counterterrorism, foreign internal defense, covert ops, direct action, hostage rescue, high-value targets/manhunt, intelligence operations, mobility operations, and unconventional warfare.

In Russian-speaking countries, special forces of any country are typically called spetsnaz, an acronym for "special purpose". In the United States, the term special forces often refers specifically to the U.S. Army Special Forces, while the term special operations forces is used more broadly for these types of units.

== Capabilities ==
Special forces capabilities include the following:

- Special reconnaissance and surveillance in hostile environments
- Foreign internal defense: Training and development of other states' military and security forces
- Offensive action
- Support to counterinsurgency through population engagement and support
- Counterterrorism operations
- Sabotage and demolition
- Hostage rescue

Other capabilities can include close personal protection; waterborne operations involving combat diving/combat swimming, maritime boarding and amphibious missions; as well as support of air force operations.

== History ==
=== Early period ===
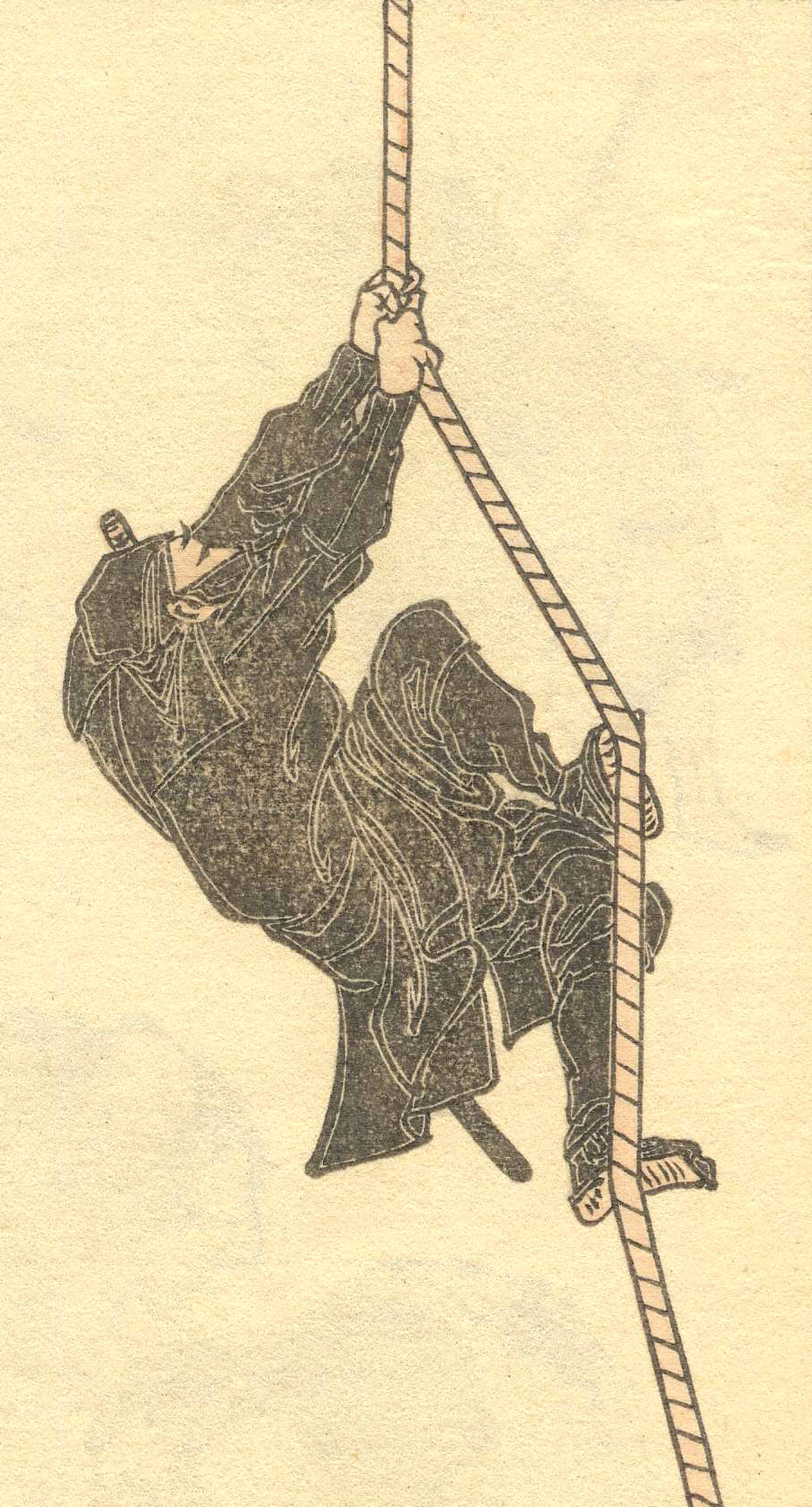
Japanese drawing of the archetypical ninja, from a series of sketches (Hokusai manga) by Hokusai.

Special forces have played an important role throughout the history of warfare, whenever the aim was to achieve disruption by "hit and run" and sabotage, rather than more traditional conventional combat. Other significant roles lay in reconnaissance, providing essential intelligence from near or among the enemy and increasingly in combating irregular forces, their infrastructure and activities.

Chinese strategist Jiang Ziya, in his Six Secret Teachings, described recruiting talented and motivated men into specialized elite units with functions such as commanding heights and making rapid long-distance advances. Elite Han troops known as jue chang (蹶張) were composed of strong crossbowmen capable of shooting and drawing powerful crossbows by the hands-and-feet method with a recorded draw-weight in excess of 340 kg/750 lb. These troops were a highly specialized, physically elite corps that operated heavy crossbows that could penetrate armor in the army of the Han dynasty. Hamilcar Barca in Sicily (249 BC) had specialized troops trained to launch several offensives per day. In the late Roman or early Byzantine period, Roman fleets used small, fast, camouflaged ships crewed by selected men for scouting and commando missions. In the Middle Ages, special forces trained to conduct special operations were employed in several occasions. An example of this were the special forces of Gerald the Fearless, a Portuguese warrior and folk hero of the Reconquista. Muslim forces also had naval special operations units, including one that used camouflaged ships to gather intelligence and launch raids and another of soldiers who could pass for Crusaders who would use ruses to board enemy ships and then capture and destroy them. In Japan, ninjas were used for reconnaissance, espionage and as assassins, bodyguards or fortress guards, or otherwise fought alongside conventional soldiers. During the Napoleonic Wars, rifle regiments and sapper units were formed that held specialised roles in reconnaissance and skirmishing and were not committed to the formal battle lines.

=== First specialized units ===
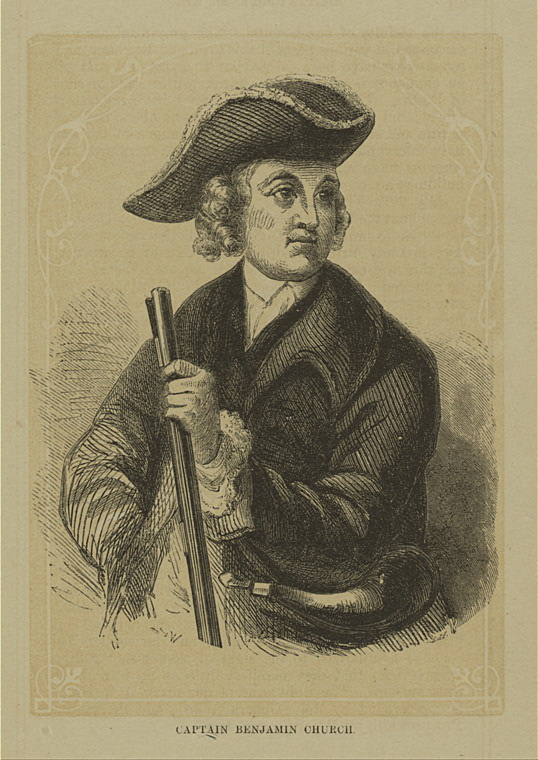
Colonel Benjamin Church (1639–1718) from the Plymouth Colony, father of Unconventional warfare, American Ranging, and Rangers

Between the 17th and 18th centuries, there were wars between American colonists and Native American tribes. In Colonial America specialized Rangers formed and first mentioned by Capt. John Smith, in 1622. Learning frontier skills from friendly Native Americans the Rangers helped carry out offensive strikes "frontier combat" against hostile Natives. Thus Ranger companies were formed to provide reconnaissance, intelligence, light infantry, and scouting. Colonel Benjamin Church (c. 1639–1718) was the captain of the first Ranger force in America (1676). Many Colonial officers would take the philosophies of Benjamin Church's ranging and form their own Ranger units.

Several Ranger companies were established in the American colonies, including Knowlton's Rangers, an elite corps of Rangers who supplied reconnaissance and espionage for George Washington's Continental Army. Daniel Morgan, was known as leader of The Corps of Rangers for the Continental Army. Rogers' Rangers on Roger's Island, in modern-day Fort Edward, New York, is regarded as the "spiritual home" of the United States Special Operations Forces, specifically the United States Army Rangers. These early American light infantry battalions were trained under Robert Rogers' 28 "Rules of Ranging", which is considered the first known manual of modern asymmetric warfare tactics used in modern special operations.

Various military Ranger units such as the United States Mounted Rangers, United States Rangers, Loudoun Rangers, 43rd Virginia Rangers, and Texas Military Rangers continued throughout the 19th-20th century until the modern formation of the Army Ranger Battalions in WWII.

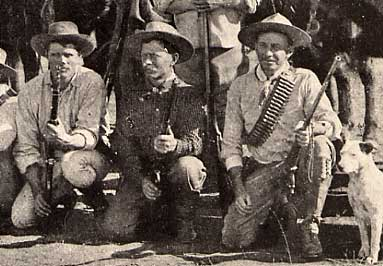
British Army scouts in South Africa (1893): Frederick Russell Burnham (middle); Hon. Maurice Gifford (right)

The British Indian Army deployed two special forces during their border wars: the Corps of Guides formed in 1846 and the Gurkha Scouts (a force that was formed in the 1890s and was first used as a detached unit during the 1897–1898 Tirah Campaign).

During the Second Boer War (1899–1902) the British Army felt the need for more specialised units. Scouting units such as the Lovat Scouts, a Scottish Highland regiment made up of exceptional woodsmen outfitted in ghillie suits and well practised in the arts of marksmanship, field craft, and military tactics filled this role. This unit was formed in 1900 by Lord Lovat and early on reported to an American, Major Frederick Russell Burnham, the Chief of Scouts under Lord Roberts. After the war, Lovat's Scouts went on to formally become the British Army's first sniper unit. Additionally, the Bushveldt Carbineers, formed in 1901, can be seen as an early unconventional warfare unit.

The Luna Sharpshooters, also known as the "Marksmen of Death" (Spanish: Tiradores de la Muerte), was an elite unit formed on 1899 by General Antonio Luna to serve under the Philippine Revolutionary Army. They became famous for fighting fiercer than the regular Filipino army soldiers. Most of the members of this unit came from the old Spanish Army Filipino members which fought during the Philippine Revolution.

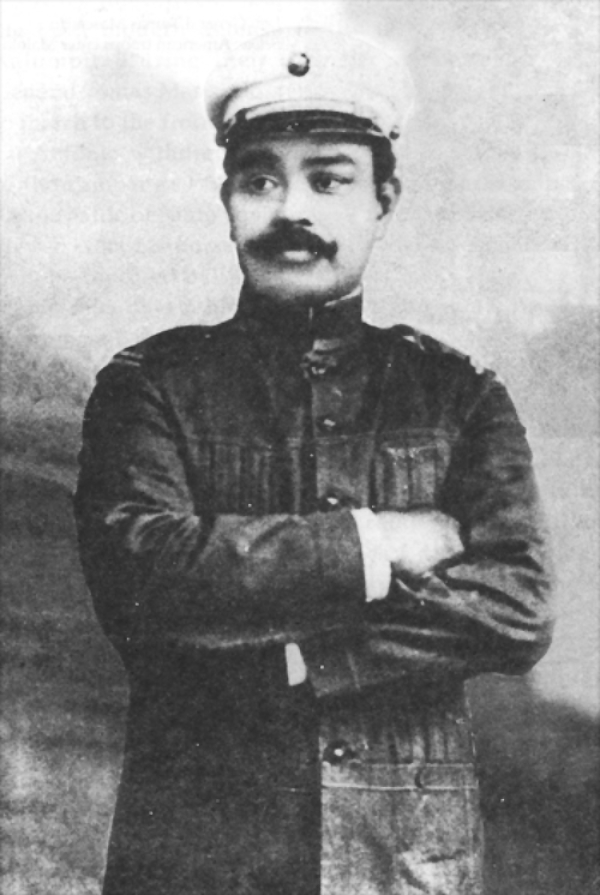
General Antonio Luna of the Philippine Revolutionary Army, the founder of Tiradores dela Muerte

The sharpshooters became famous for their fierce fighting and proved their worth by being the usual spearheading unit in every major battle in the Philippine–American War. In the Battle of Paye on December 19, 1899, Bonifacio Mariano, a sharpshooter under the command of General Licerio Gerónimo, killed General Henry Ware Lawton of the United States Army, making the latter the highest ranking casualty during the course of the war.

=== World War I ===
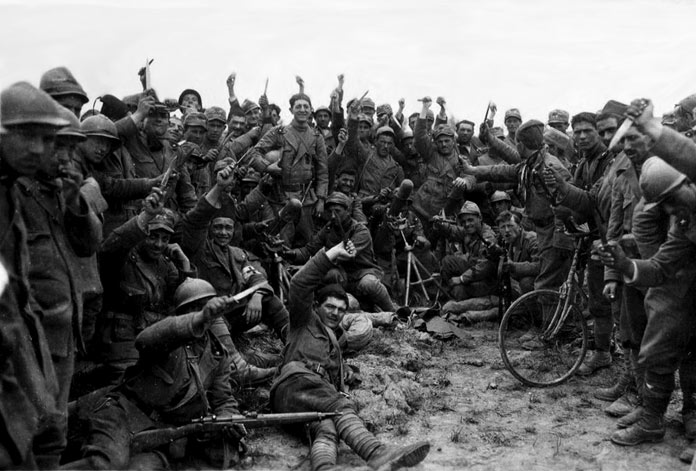
Members of the Italian Arditi corps, 1918, brandishing daggers.

The German Stormtroopers and the Italian Arditi were the first modern shock troops. They were both elite assault units trained to a much higher level than that of average troops and tasked to carry out daring attacks and bold raids against enemy defenses. Unlike Stormtroopers, Arditi were not units within infantry divisions, but were considered a separate combat arm.

=== Interwar period ===
==== Chaco war ====
The Macheteros de Jara was an auxiliary cavalry regiment that was organized since August 15, 1932, before the Battle of Boquerón began. The regiment was recruited from former outlaws from Paraguay who fought against Bolivian officers and soldiers.

The 50th Infantry Regiment (Cuchilleros de la Muerte) was a Bolivian infantry regiment that fought in the Chaco War. Nicknamed the Knives of Death (Spanish: Cuchillos de la Muerte), the regiment relied almost exclusively on the use of blade weapons, particularly bayonets.

=== World War II ===
==== British ====
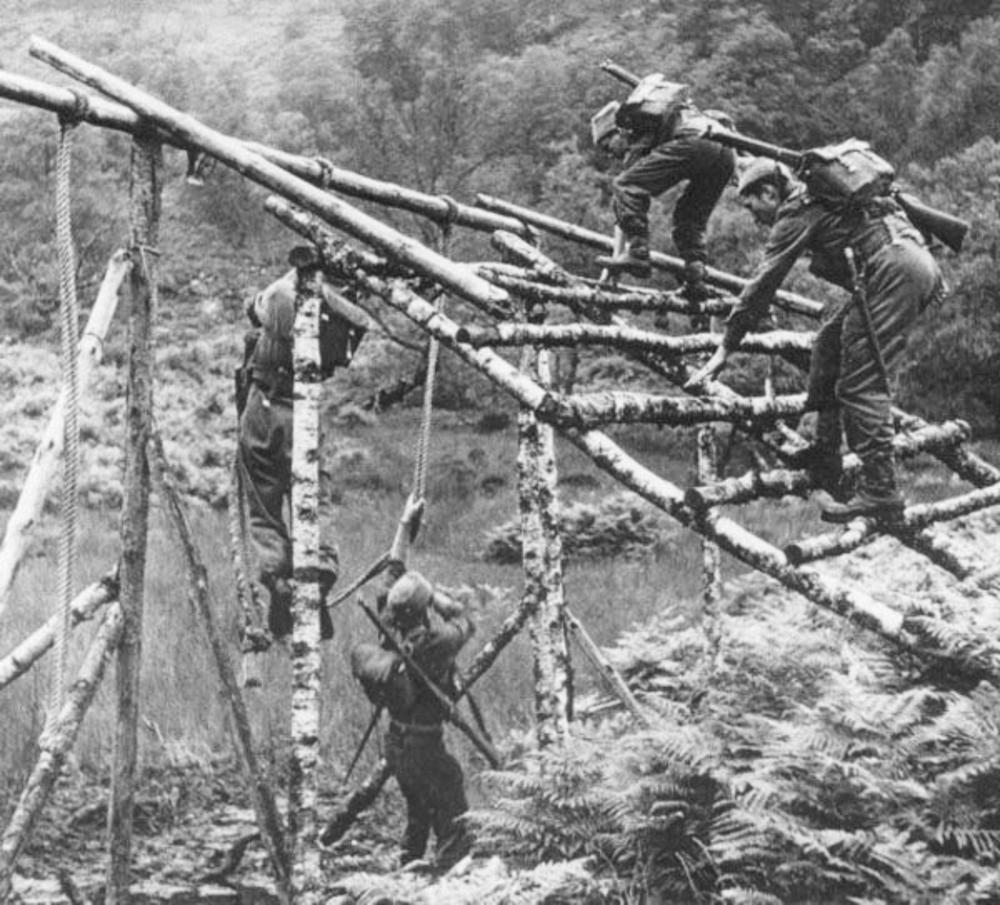
The British Commandos were the prototype for the modern special forces. Volunteers had to undergo an arduous training course.

Modern special forces emerged during the Second World War. In 1940, the British Commandos were formed following Winston Churchill's call for "specially trained troops of the hunter class, who can develop a reign of terror down the enemy coast." A staff officer, Lieutenant Colonel Dudley Clarke, had already submitted such a proposal to General Sir John Dill, the Chief of the Imperial General Staff. Dill, aware of Churchill's intentions, approved Clarke's proposal and on 23 June 1940, the first Commando raid took place.

By the autumn of 1940 more than 2,000 men had volunteered and in November 1940 these new units were organised into a Special Service Brigade consisting of four battalions under the command of Brigadier J. C. Haydon. The Special Service Brigade was quickly expanded to 12 units which became known as Commandos. Each Commando had a lieutenant colonel as the commanding officer and numbered around 450 men (divided into 75-man troops that were further divided into 15-man sections).

In December 1940 a Middle East Commando depot was formed with the responsibility of training and supplying reinforcements for the Commando units in that theatre. In February 1942 the Commando training depot at Achnacarry in the Scottish Highlands was established by Brigadier Charles Haydon. Under the command of Lieutenant Colonel Charles Vaughan, the Commando depot was responsible for training complete units and individual replacements. The training regime was for the time innovative and physically demanding, and far in advance of normal British Army training. The depot staff were all hand picked, with the ability to outperform any of the volunteers.

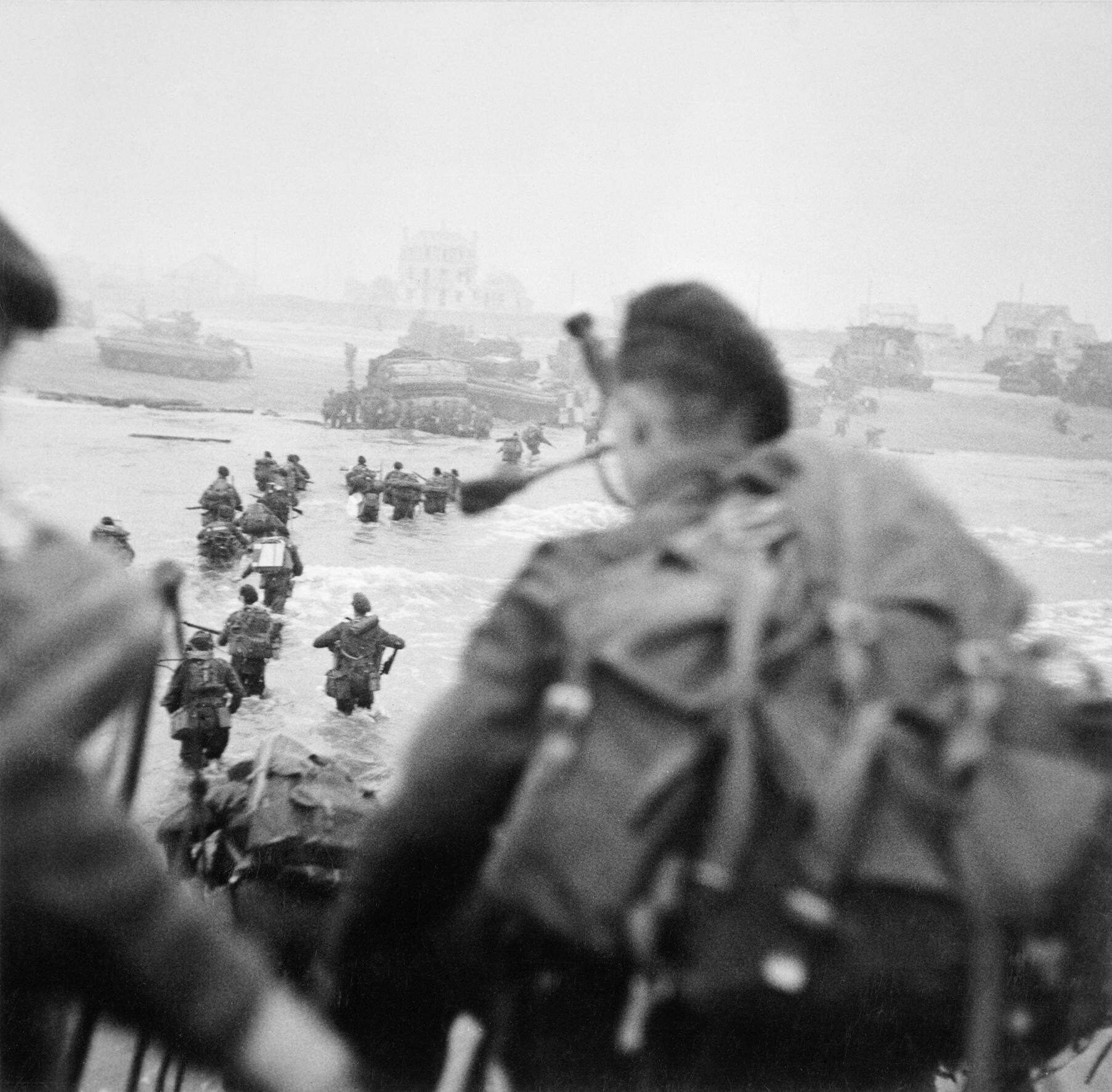
British Commandos wearing the green beret and carrying the Bergen rucksack during the Normandy landings

Training and assessment started immediately on arrival, with the volunteers having to complete an 8-mile (13 km) march with all their equipment from the Spean Bridge railway station to the commando depot. Exercises were conducted using live ammunition and explosives to make training as realistic as possible. Physical fitness was a prerequisite, with cross country runs and boxing matches to improve fitness. Speed and endurance marches were conducted up and down the nearby mountain ranges and over assault courses that included a zip-line over Loch Arkaig, all while carrying arms and full equipment. Training continued by day and night with river crossings, mountain climbing, weapons training, unarmed combat, map reading, and small boat operations on the syllabus.

Reaching a wartime strength of over 30 individual units and four assault brigades, the Commandos served in all theatres of war from the Arctic Circle to Europe and from the Mediterranean and Middle East to South-East Asia. Their operations ranged from small groups of men landing from the sea or by parachute to a brigade of assault troops spearheading the Allied invasions of Europe and Asia. The first modern special forces units were established by men who had served with the Commandos, including the Parachute Regiment, Special Air Service, and Special Boat Service. The No. 10 (Inter-Allied) Commando organised by British of volunteers from occupied Europe led to French Commandos Marine, Dutch Korps Commandotroepen, Belgian Paracommando Brigade.

==== Special Air Service (SAS) ====
The first modern special forces unit was the Special Air Service (SAS), formed in July 1941 from an unorthodox idea and plan by Lieutenant David Stirling. In June 1940 he volunteered for the No. 8 (Guards) Commando (later named "Layforce"). After Layforce was disbanded, Stirling remained convinced that due to the mechanized nature of war a small team of highly trained soldiers with the advantage of surprise could exact greater damage to the enemy's ability to fight than an entire platoon. His idea was for small teams of parachute trained soldiers to operate behind enemy lines to gain intelligence, destroy enemy aircraft, and attack their supply and reinforcement routes. Following a meeting with the C-in-C Middle East, General Claude Auchinleck, his plan was endorsed by the Army High Command.

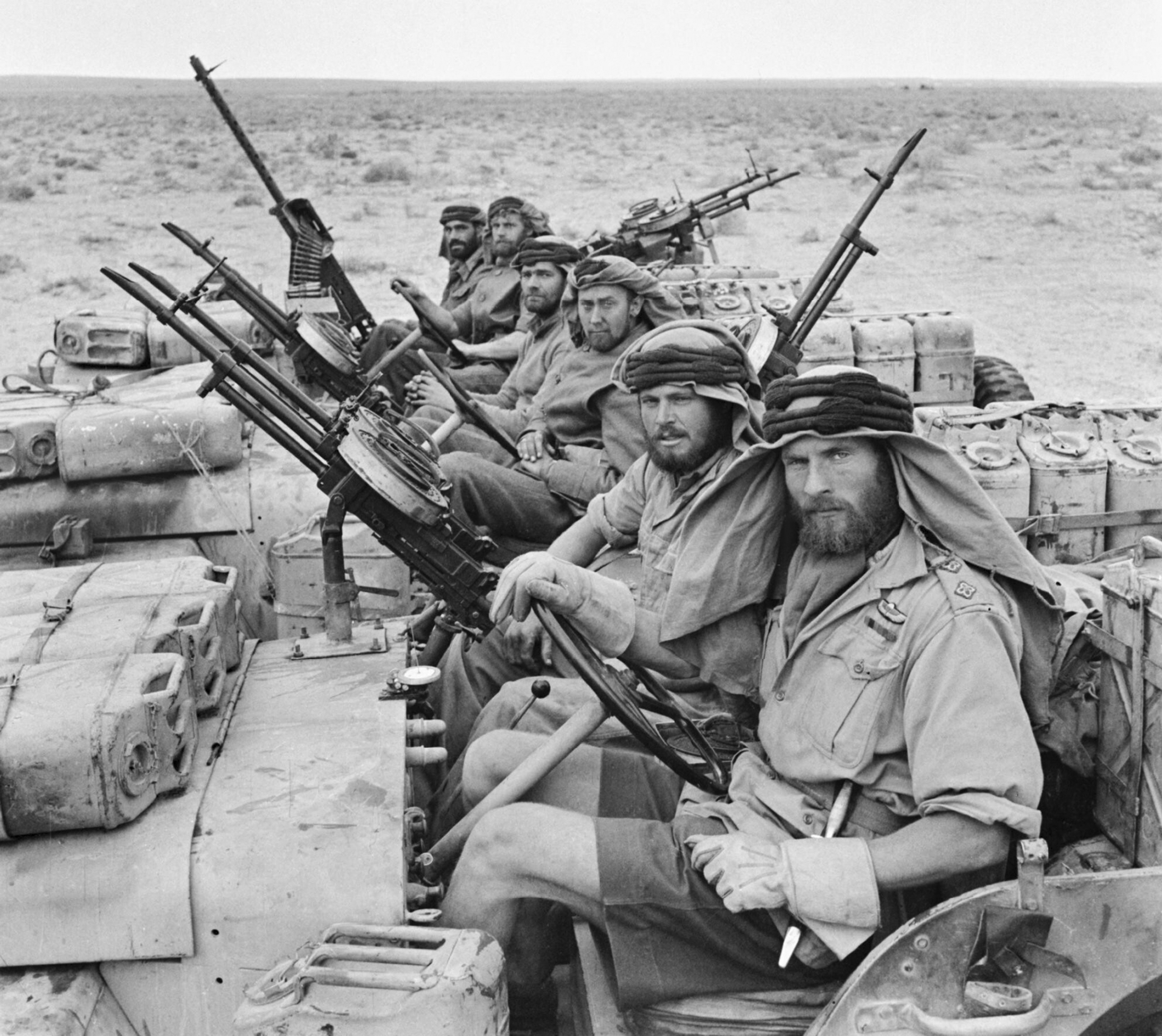
British SAS in North Africa (1943), in jeeps with mounted heavy machine guns

The force initially consisted of five officers and 60 other ranks. Following extensive training at Kabrit camp, by the River Nile, L Detachment, SAS Brigade, undertook its first operations in the Western Desert. Stirling's vision was eventually vindicated after a series of successful operations. In 1942, the SAS attacked Bouerat. Transported by the Long Range Desert Group (which carried out deep penetration, covert reconnaissance patrols, intelligence missions and attacks behind the enemy lines from 1940), they caused severe damage to the harbour, petrol tanks and storage facilities. This was followed up in March by a raid on Benghazi harbour with limited success but they did damage to 15 aircraft at Al-Berka. The June 1942 Crete airfield raids at Heraklion, Kasteli, Tympaki and Maleme significant damage was caused, and raids at Fuka and Mersa Matruh airfields destroyed 30 aircraft.

==== Chindits ====
In the Burma Campaign, the Chindits, whose long-range penetration groups were trained to operate from bases deep behind Japanese lines, contained commandos (King's Regiment (Liverpool), 142 Commando Company) and Gurkhas. Their jungle expertise, which would play an important part in many British special forces operations post-war, was learned at a great cost in lives in the jungles of Burma fighting the Japanese.

===== The Company of Chosen Immortals =====
Immediately after the German occupation of Greece in April–May 1941, the Greek government fled to Egypt and started to form military units in exile. Air Force Lt. Colonel G. Alexandris suggested the creation of an Army unit along the lines of the British SAS. In August 1942 the Company of Chosen Immortals (Greek: Λόχος Επιλέκτων Αθανάτων) was formed under Cavalry Major Antonios Stefanakis in Palestine, with 200 men. In 1942, the unit was renamed Sacred Band. In close cooperation with the commander of the British SAS Regiment, Lt. Colonel David Stirling, the company moved to the SAS base at Qabrit in Egypt to begin its training in its new role. The special forces unit fought alongside the SAS in the Western Desert and the Aegean.

==== Poland ====
During the start of World War II "September campaign," the Polish Government did not sign the capitulation, but moved to Paris and then to London. In an attempt to achieve its aims the government in exile gave orders to the Polish resistance and formed a special military unit in Britain with the soldiers called Cichociemni ("silent and unseen") paratroopers to be deployed into Poland. The Cichociemni were trained similar to the British Special Forces, with the curricula differing according to each soldier's specialization. Their task, on deployment to Poland, was to sustain the structures of the Polish state, training the members of the Resistance in fighting the German occupant. This included taking part in the Warsaw Uprising.

==== Australian ====
Following advice from the British, Australia began raising special forces. The first units were independent companies, which began training at Wilson's Promontory in Victoria in early 1941 under the tutelage of British instructors. With an establishment of 17 officers and 256 men, the independent companies were trained as "stay-behind" forces, a role that they later played against the Japanese in the South West Pacific Area during 1942–43, most notably fighting a guerrilla campaign in Timor, as well as actions in New Guinea. In all, a total of eight independent companies were raised before they were re-organised in mid-1943 into commando squadrons and placed under the command of the divisional cavalry regiments that were re-designated as cavalry commando regiments. As a part of this structure, a total of 11 commando squadrons were raised.

They continued to act independently and were often assigned at brigade level during the later stages of the war, taking part in the fighting in New Guinea, Bougainville and Borneo, where they were employed largely in long-range reconnaissance and flank-protection roles. In addition to these units, the Australians also raised the Z Special Unit and M Special Unit. M Special Unit largely had an intelligence-gathering role, while Z Special Force undertook direct-action missions. One of its most notable actions came with Operation Jaywick, which sank several Japanese ships in Singapore Harbour in 1943. A second raid on Singapore in 1944, known as Operation Rimau, was unsuccessful.

==== Soviet ====
The Soviet Union developed and expanded special forces – notably the GRU's Spetsnaz and the NKVD's Osnaz – in the period of World War II; such units included (for example) naval, army reconnaissance and parachute troops.

==== United States ====
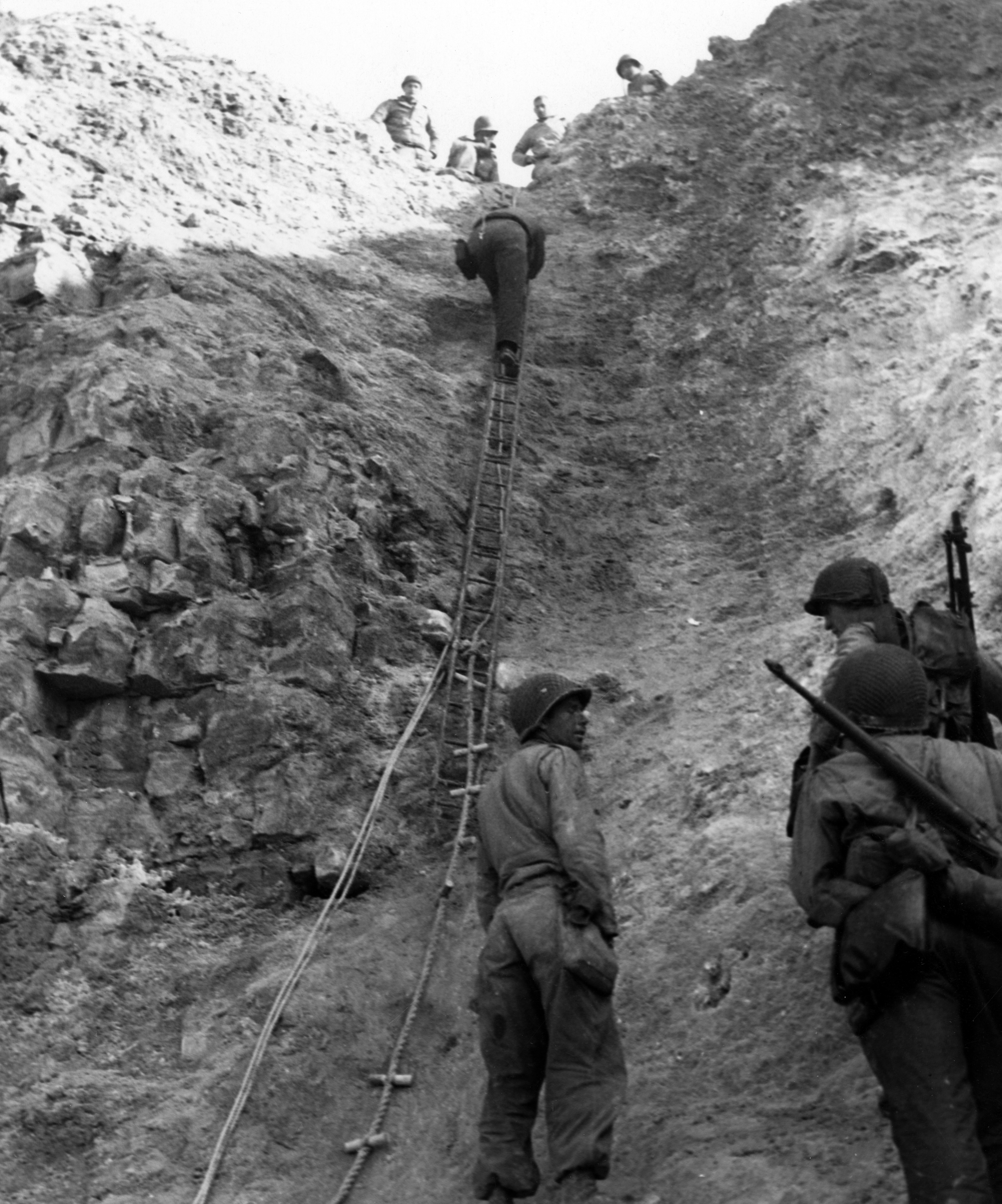
United States Army Rangers at D-Day, Pointe du Hoc

==== Office of Strategic Services ====
The United States formed the Office of Strategic Services (OSS) during World War II under the Medal of Honor recipient William J. Donovan. This organization was the predecessor of the Central Intelligence Agency (CIA) and was responsible for both intelligence and special forces missions. The CIA's elite Special Activities Division is the direct descendant of the OSS.

==== Marine Raiders ====
On February 16, 1942, the U.S. Marine Corps activated a battalion of Marines with the specific purpose of securing beach heads, and other special operations. The battalion became the first modern special operations force of the U.S. The battalion became known as Marine Raiders due to Admiral Chester Nimitz's request for "raiders" in the Pacific front of the war.

==== United States Army Rangers ====
The history of the United States Army Rangers specialist soldier dates back to the 17th through 19th century from military units such as United States Mounted Rangers, United States Rangers and Texas Rangers. In WWII mid-1942, Major-General Lucian Truscott of the U.S. Army, a General Staff submitted a proposal to General George Marshall conceived under the guidance of then Army Chief of Staff, General George C. Marshall, that selectively trained Ranger soldiers were recruited for the newly established special operations Army Ranger Battalion.

==== 1st Special Service Force ====
The United States and Canada formed the 1st Special Service Force as a sabotage ski brigade for operations in Norway. Later known as the "Devil's Brigade" (and called "The Black Devils" by mystified German soldiers), the First Special Service Force was dispatched to the occupied Aleutian Islands, Italy and Southern France.

==== Merrill's Marauders and Alamo Scouts ====
Merrill's Marauders were modeled on the Chindits and took part in similar operations in Burma. In late November 1943, the Alamo Scouts (Sixth Army Special Reconnaissance Unit) were formed to conduct reconnaissance and raider work in the Southwest Pacific Theater under the personal command of then Lt. General Walter Krueger, Commanding General, Sixth U.S. Army. Krueger envisioned that the Alamo Scouts, consisting of small teams of highly trained volunteers, would operate deep behind enemy lines to provide intelligence-gathering and tactical reconnaissance in advance of Sixth U.S. Army landing operations.

==== Special Forces Tab ====
In 1983, nearly 40 years after the end of World War II, the US Army created the Special Forces Tab. It was later decided that personnel with at least 120 days' wartime service prior to 1955 in certain units, including the Devil's Brigade, the Alamo Scouts and the OSS Operational Groups, would receive the Tab for their services in World War II, placing them all in the lineage of today's U.S. and Canadian (via Devil's Brigade) Special Forces.

==== Axis powers ====
The Axis powers did not adopt the use of special forces on the same scale as the British.

===== German =====
The German army's Brandenburger Regiment was founded as a special forces unit used by the Abwehr for infiltration and long distance reconnaissance in Fall Weiss of 1939 and the Fall Gelb and Barbarossa campaigns of 1940 and 1941.

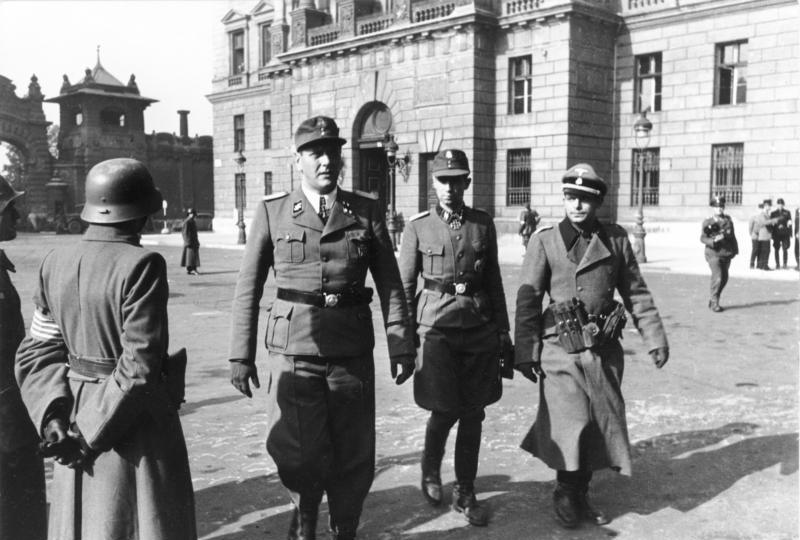
Otto Skorzeny (left) and the former Brandenburger Adrian von Fölkersam (middle), 1944

Later during the war the 502nd SS Jäger Battalion, commanded by Otto Skorzeny, sowed disorder behind the Allied lines by mis-directing convoys away from the front lines. A handful of his men were captured by the Americans and spread a rumor that Skorzeny was leading a raid on Paris to kill or capture General Dwight Eisenhower. Although this was untrue, Eisenhower was confined to his headquarters for several days and Skorzeny was labelled "the most dangerous man in Europe".

===== Italian =====
In Italy, the Decima Flottiglia MAS was responsible for the sinking and damage of considerable British tonnage in the Mediterranean. Also there were other Italian special forces like A.D.R.A. (Arditi Distruttori Regia Aeronautica). This regiment was used in raids on Allied airbases and railways in North Africa in 1943. In one mission they destroyed 25 B-17 Flying Fortress bombers.

===== Japanese =====
The Imperial Japanese Army first deployed army paratroops in combat during the Battle of Palembang, on Sumatra in the Netherlands East Indies, on 14 February 1942. The operation was well-planned, with 425 men of the 1st Parachute Raiding Regiment seizing Palembang airfield, while the paratroopers of the 2nd Parachute Raiding Regiment seized the town and its important oil refinery. Paratroops were subsequently deployed in the Burma campaign. The 1st Glider Tank Troop was formed in 1943, with four Type 95 Ha-Go light tanks. The paratroop brigades were organized into the Teishin Shudan as the first division-level raiding unit, at the main Japanese airborne base, Karasehara Airfield, Kyūshū, Japan.

However, as with similar airborne units created by the Allies and other Axis powers, the Japanese paratroops suffered from a disproportionately high casualty rate, and the loss of men who required such extensive and expensive training limited their operations to only the most critical ones. Two regiments of Teishin Shudan were formed into the 1st Raiding Group, commanded by Major General Rikichi Tsukada under the control of the Southern Expeditionary Army Group, during the Philippines campaign. Although structured as a division, its capabilities were much lower, as its six regiments had manpower equivalent to a standard infantry battalion, and it lacked any form of artillery, and had to rely on other units for logistical support. Its men were no longer parachute-trained, but relied on aircraft for transport.

Some 750 men from the 2nd Raiding Brigade, of this group were assigned to attack American air bases on Luzon and Leyte on the night of 6 December 1944. They were flown in Ki-57 transports, but most of the aircraft were shot down. Some 300 commandos managed to land in the Burauen area on Leyte. The force destroyed some planes and inflicted numerous casualties, before they were annihilated.

===== Finnish =====
During World War II, the Finnish Army and Border Guard organized sissi forces into a long-range reconnaissance patrol (kaukopartio) units. These were open only to volunteers and operated far behind enemy lines in small teams. They conducted both intelligence-gathering missions and raids on e.g. enemy supply depots or other strategic targets. They were generally highly effective. For example, during the Battle of Ilomantsi, Soviet supply lines were harassed to the point that the Soviet artillery was unable to exploit its massive numerical advantage over Finnish artillery. Their operations were also classified as secret because of the political sensitivity of such operations. Only authorized military historians could publish on their operations; individual soldiers were required to take the secrets to the grave. A famous LRRP commander was Lauri Törni, who later joined the U.S. Army to train U.S. personnel in special operations.

=== Bangladesh Liberation War (1971) ===
In June 1971, during the Bangladesh Liberation War, the World Bank sent a mission to observe the situation in East Pakistan. The media cell of Pakistan's government was circulating the news that the situation in East Pakistan was stable and normal. Khaled Mosharraf, a sector commander of Mukti Bahini, planned to deploy a special commando team. The task assigned to the team was to carry out commando operations and to terrorize Dhaka. The major objective of this team was to prove that the situation was not actually normal. Moreover, Pakistan, at that time, was expecting economic aid from World Bank, which was assumed to be spent to buy arms. The plan was to make World Bank Mission understand the true situation of East Pakistan and to stop sanctioning the aid. Khaled, along with A. T. M. Haider, another sector commander, formed the Crack Platoon. Initially, the number of commandos in the platoon was 17, trained in Melaghar Camp. From Melaghar, commandos of Crack Platoon headed for Dhaka on 4 June 1971 and launched a guerrilla operation on 5 June. Later, the number of commandos increased, the platoon split and deployed in different areas surrounding Dhaka city. The basic objectives of the Crack Platoon were to demonstrate the strength of Mukti Bahini, terrorising Pakistan Army and their collaborators. Another major objective was proving to the international community that the situation in East Pakistan was not normal. That commando team also aimed at inspiring the people of Dhaka, who were frequently victims of killing and torture. The Crack Platoon successfully fulfilled these objectives. The World Bank mission, in its report, clearly described the hazardous situation prevailing in East Pakistan and urged ending the military regime in East Pakistan. The Crack Platoon carried out several successful and important operations. The power supply in Dhaka was devastated which caused severe problems for the Pakistan Army and the military administration in Dhaka.

=== Modern special forces ===
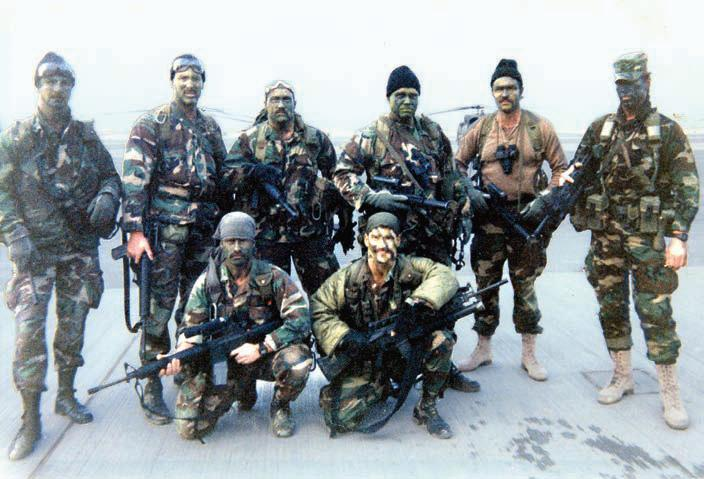
ODA 525 team picture taken shortly before infiltration in Iraq, February 1991

Stemming from Resolution 598, Operation Prime Chance was the first deployment of U.S. Special Operations Command (USSOCOM) troops, which were a product of the Reagan administration under Secretary of Defense Caspar Weinberger. Admiral William H. McRaven, formerly the ninth commanding officer of USSOCOM (2011–2014), described two approaches to special forces operations in the 2012 posture statement to the U.S. Senate Committee on Armed Services: "the direct approach is characterized by technologically enabled small-unit precision lethality, focused intelligence, and inter-agency cooperation integrated on a digitally-networked battlefield", whereas the "indirect approach includes empowering host nation forces, providing appropriate assistance to humanitarian agencies, and engaging key populations." Elements of national power must be deployed in concert without over-reliance on a single capability, such as special forces, that leaves the entire force unprepared and hollow across the spectrum of military operations.

Throughout the latter half of the 20th century and into the 21st century, special forces have come to higher prominence, as governments have found objectives can sometimes be better achieved by a small team of anonymous specialists than a larger and much more politically controversial conventional deployment. In both Kosovo and Afghanistan, special forces were used to co-ordinate activities between local guerrilla fighters and air power.

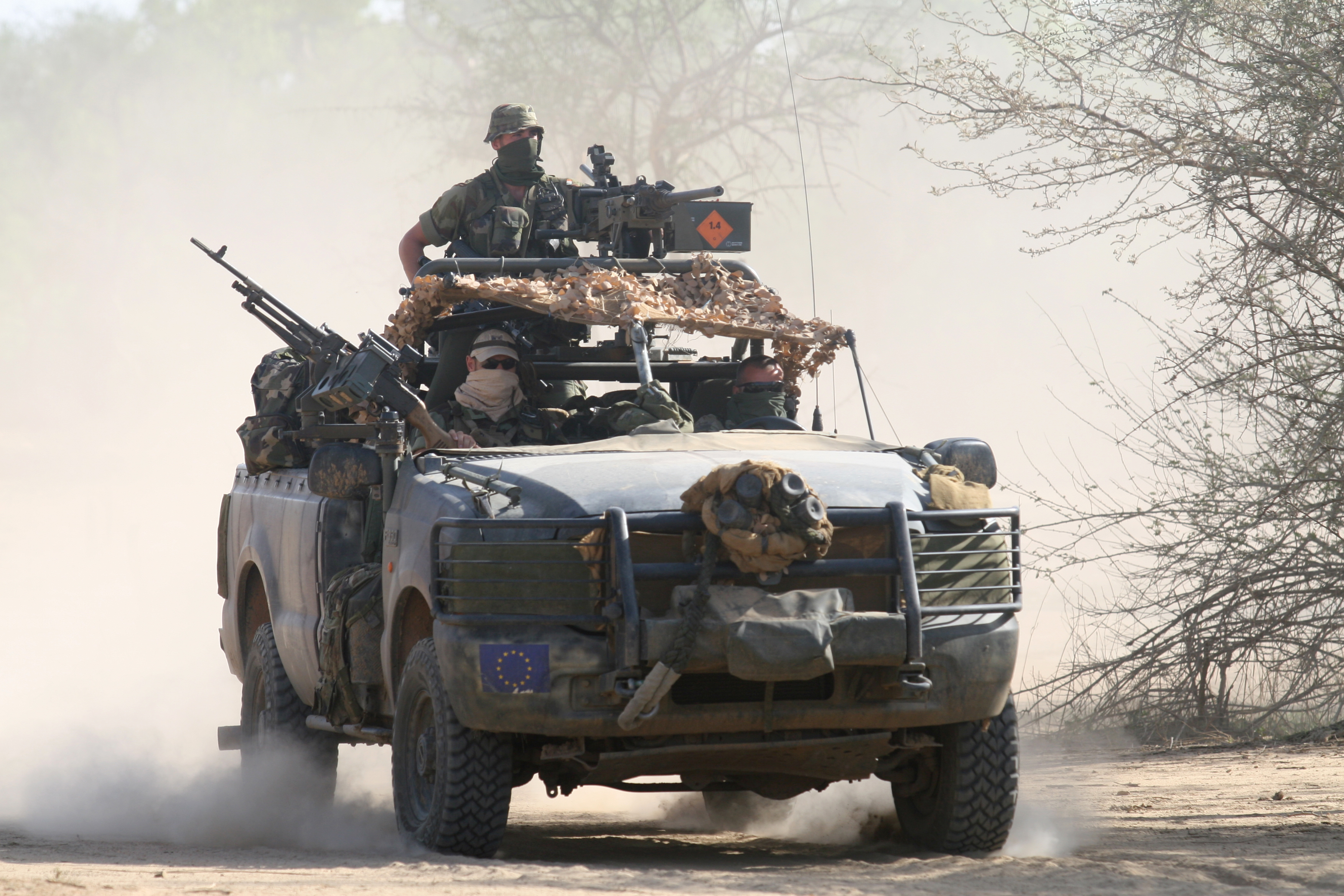
Irish Army Ranger Wing operators during patrol in Chad, 2008

Typically, guerrilla fighters would engage enemy soldiers and tanks causing them to move, where they could be seen and attacked from the air.

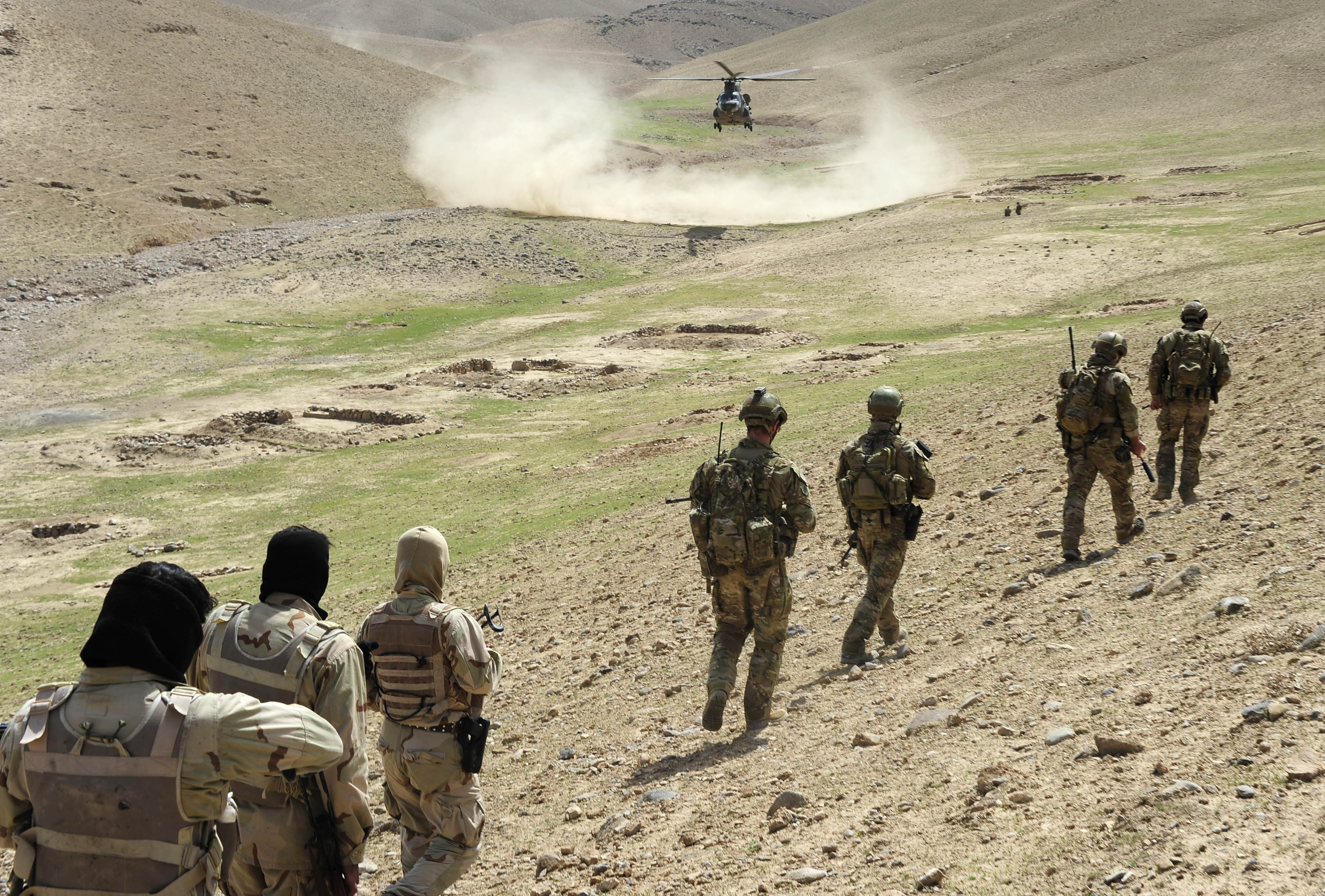
Australian special forces walking with Afghan National Army to a waiting U.S. Army Chinook helicopter in 2012

Special forces have been used in both wartime and peacetime military operations such as the Laotian Civil War, Bangladesh Liberation War-1971, Vietnam War, Portuguese Colonial War, South African Border War, Falklands War, The Troubles in Northern Ireland, the Jaffna University Helidrop, the first and second Gulf Wars, Afghanistan, Croatia, Kosovo, Bosnia, the first and second Chechen Wars, the Iranian Embassy siege (London), the Air France Flight 8969 (Marseille), Operation Defensive Shield, Operation Khukri, the Moscow theater hostage crisis, Operation Orchard, the Japanese Embassy hostage crisis (Lima), in Sri Lanka against the LTTE, the raid on Osama Bin Laden's compound in Pakistan, the 2016 Indian Line of Control strike the 2015 Indian counter-insurgency operation in Myanmar and the Barisha Raid in Syria of 2019.

The U.S. invasion of Afghanistan involved special forces from several coalition nations, who played a major role in removing the Taliban from power in 2001–2002. Special forces have continued to play a role in combating the Taliban in subsequent operations.

As gender restrictions are being removed in parts of the world, women are applying for special forces units selections and in 2014 the Norwegian Special Operation Forces established an all female unit Jegertroppen (English: Ranger Platoon).

== See also ==
- List of military special forces units
- Commando
- Airborne forces
- Long Range Reconnaissance Patrol
- Frogman
- List of military diving units
- Police Tactical Unit
