= Penal military unit =

Military formation consisting of convicts mobilized for military service

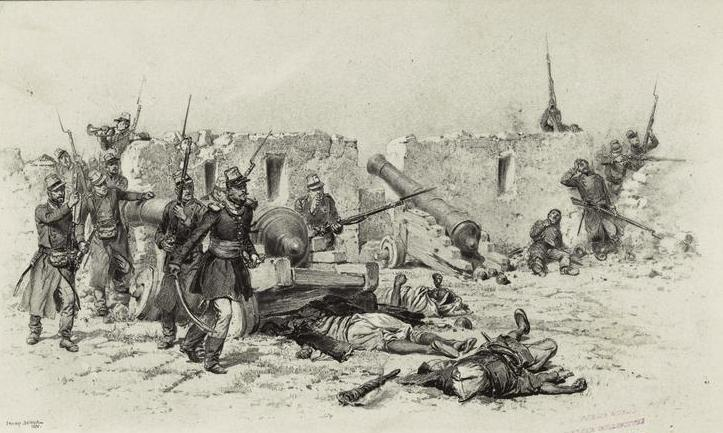
The Battalions of Light Infantry of Africa, a French Army penal military unit, depicted in battle during the French conquest of Algeria in 1833

A penal military unit, also known as a penal formation, disciplinary unit, or just penal unit (usually named for their formation and size, such as penal battalion for battalions, penal regiment for regiments, penal company for companies, etc.), is a military formation consisting of convicts mobilized for military service. Such formations may consist of military prisoners convicted under military law, civilian prisoners convicted in civilian courts, prisoners of war who have chosen to side with their captors, or a combination of these groups.

Service in penal military units is generally considered a form of punishment, discipline, or penal labour, used in lieu of, or offered as an alternative to, imprisonment or capital punishment. Penal units have historically been used as disposable cannon fodder, treated poorly or with little regard and used in compromising or dangerous situations (commonly suicide missions such as demining or forlorn hope advance parties), as march battalions that maintain replacement personnel as reserves, or kept in the rear for military operations other than war or menial labour relating to the war effort, guarded and overseen by regular military units, military police, or barrier troops to ensure they do not attempt to escape, retreat, or mutiny. However, this is not always the case: some penal units are treated the same as regular units and, depending on military organization, a dedicated penal unit may not exist at all, with convicts instead being placed in a regular unit. Rewards and incentives for convicts to serve in a penal unit vary—often expungement, commutation, stay of execution, or a pardon—though penal units used as punishment typically lack those by nature.

The first known penal military units were recorded in imperial China. Since then, several nations and armed forces across history and the world have also fielded penal units of varying sizes with varying roles. Penal units are extremely rare in the modern day, with most militaries relying instead on volunteers and conscripts for military personnel, and convicts and criminals—typically only accepted into military service out of necessity—usually being placed into regular units. The hiring of prisoners for combat and military service, often in exchange for freedom, is a common trope in modern fiction and popular culture, with narratives centering around penal units appearing in films, television, novels, and video games.

== History ==
One of the earliest examples of penal military units was established, were written in the Chinese annals Records of the Grand Historian and Book of Han. During the Han–Dayuan War, unhappy with the failure of General Li Guangli in an earlier expedition in 104 BC, Emperor Wu of Han promised amnesty and rewards to criminals, prisoners and bandits (赦囚徒捍寇盜) and dispatched a 60,000-strong army consisting of "bad boys" (惡少年) to attack the Greco-Bactrian kingdom of Dayuan in 102 BC.

Dedicated penal units were first envisioned during the Napoleonic era of warfare, as large armies formed of conscripts often suffered from disciplinary problems. Soldiers who refused to face the enemy were seen as detrimental to the cohesion of the army and as a disgrace to the nation. The formation of penal battalions was seen as a way of disciplining an army and keeping soldiers in line. In addition, many nations conscripted criminals into penal battalions in lieu of imprisoning or executing them during wartime to better utilize national manpower. Such military units were treated with little regard by the regular army and were often placed in compromising situations, such as being used in forlorn hope assaults. The French Empire in particular was notable for employing penal military units during the wars of the coalition, especially during the later years of the conflicts as manpower became limited. The Régiment pénal de l'Île de Ré, formed in 1811 and composed almost entirely of criminals and other societal undesirables, would see action during the later years of the Napoleonic Wars.

The disbandment of conscripted armies and end of large scale warfare following the Napoleonic era led to the decline of the penal battalion system in continental Europe. However, the system continued in overseas colonies, again with the French as the primary employers of penal battalions. The Battalions of Light Infantry of Africa (Bats d'Af) was formed by order of Louis Philippe I in 1832 for the purpose of expanding the French colonial empire. The Battalions fought in the French conquest of Algeria and during the Crimean War. The French also employed the compagnies d'exclus ("companies of the excluded"), military units which were stationed at Aîn-Sefra in Southern Algeria. In contrast to the Bats d'Af, the compagnies d'exclus were outright penal units consisting of convicts condemned to five years or more of hard labor and judged unworthy to carry weapons.

The various Italian unification conflicts saw the Redshirts recruiting convicts and revolutionaries from prisons into penal regiments known as Battaglioni degli imprigionati ("Battalions of the Imprisoned" or "Prisoners Battalion".)

Prior to the early 1900s, the Portuguese Empire relied largely on military convicts to augment the regular and indigenous troops employed to provide garrisons for its overseas colonies.

During World War I, the British Armed Forces were mobilized for military service. Courts offered defendants the option of enlisting to avoid imprisonment, while young offenders in borstals and adult prisoners were granted early release for their service. Though government officials publicly claimed criminals were unfit for service, and prisoners were viewed as lacking "the sense of duty that encouraged other men to enlist", the recruitment of prisoners was a military necessity, and prisoners were reportedly sought out for their violent nature and to ease the cost of the prison system in wartime.

The period of military rearmament preceding World War II caused renewed interest in the concept of penal military units. In May 1935 the German Wehrmacht instituted a new policy under German conscription law that stated soldiers who were deemed disruptive to military discipline but were otherwise "worthy of service" would be sent to military penal units. Criminals were also conscripted into penal units in exchange for lighter sentences or as a form of stay of execution. These units, referred to as "special departments" or the generic term Strafbataillon, were overseen by the German military police. Prior to World War II, there were nine Strafbataillone within the Wehrmacht. The primary role of a Strafbataillon was to provide front line support. As the war progressed, the size of Strafbataillon companies dramatically increased in size due to changes in German military policy. Under such policies, any soldier who had a death sentence (for retreat) commuted was automatically reassigned to penal units, greatly increasing the number of soldiers available to the Strafbataillon.

The effectiveness of Strafbataillone were mixed. The combination of criminals, political prisoners, and undisciplined soldiers that made up a Strafbataillon often required harsh measures to be imposed for unit cohesion to be maintained. Strafbataillone were often ordered to undertake high risk missions on the front line, with soldiers being coached to regain their lost honor by fighting. Certain penal military units, such as the 36th Waffen Grenadier Division of the SS, gained a reputation as being brutal towards civilian populations and prisoners of war, and were employed as anti-partisan troops due to the fear they inspired. Other units, most notably the 999th Light Afrika Division, suffered from poor morale and saw soldiers desert the Wehrmacht to join resistance groups.

Following Operation Barbarossa and the entry of the Soviet Union into World War II, the Red Army began to seriously consider the implementation of penal military units. These efforts resulted in the creation of Shtrafbat, penal military units composed of sentenced soldiers, political prisoners, and others deemed to be expendable. A large number of Red Army soldiers who retreated without orders during the initial German invasion were reorganized into rudimentary penal units, the precursors to dedicated Shtrafbat. The Shtrafbat were greatly increased in number by Joseph Stalin in July 1942 via Order No. 227 (Директива Ставки ВГК №227). Order No. 227 was a desperate effort to re-instill discipline after the panicked routs of the first year of combat with Germany. The order—popularized as the "Not one step back!" (Ни шагу назад!, Ni shagu nazad!) Order—introduced severe punishments, including summary execution, for unauthorized retreats.

During the Chinese Civil War, between 1945 and 1949, the National Revolutionary Army (NRA) was known to have fielded penal battalions. Made up of deserters and those accused of cowardice, these penal battalions were given dangerous tasks such as scouting ahead of the main forces to check for ambushes, crossing rivers and torrents to see whether they were fordable, and traversing unmapped minefields.

In the United States, the United States Armed Forces historically fielded penal units and permitted the enlistment of prisoners. During the American Civil War, the Union permitted Galvanized Yankees, Confederate prisoners of war who swore allegiance to the Union, into their ranks in penal units from 1862 to around 1866. During World War II, prisoners were permitted to provide to the war effort, and in 1942, it was reported that several prisoners had offered to enlist in the military to fight in the war, with some even receiving training ahead of enlistment, though no penal units are known to have been formed in the U.S. military.

U.S. courts offered defendants the choice between enlistment and prison during both world wars and the Korean War until at least the Vietnam War; reportedly, this was how R. Lee Ermey, a U.S. Marine Corps staff sergeant and drill instructor known for his acting role in the 1987 film Full Metal Jacket, enlisted as a 17-year-old delinquent in 1961. However, convicts were not placed in separate penal units, and the practice was entirely up to the judge with the military having the option to reject the defendant. Presently, all branches of the U.S. military forbid the acceptance of convicts, both after sentencing and as an alternative to imprisonment (except the U.S. Navy, which does not have specific prohibitions but still strongly discourages it as a protocol), and do not maintain any penal formations, though ex-convicts with felony priors are still permitted with a proper felony waiver. In 2021, the Florida Legislature proposed a bill that would formally permit first-time offenders 25-years-old or younger to enlist instead of facing imprisonment, though it did not pass.

In the modern day, the practice of fielding penal military units has largely stopped, with most militaries discouraging or outright prohibiting the acceptance of convicts, though some militaries accept ex-convicts provided they fulfill certain requirements, such as having a proper waiver. For example, a U.S. military recruiter told The Daily Beast in 2018 that recruitment candidates can have "one non-violent felony as an adult", and that "some of the best and most capable candidates we get require a waiver". However, though rare, the practice of accepting convicts into armed forces has continued or been made permissible in some jurisdictions and situations. During the Russian invasion of Ukraine, for instance, the Armed Forces of Ukraine permitted the recruitment of Ukrainian prisoners with prior combat experience, and Russian private military company Wagner Group began hiring Russian inmates to fill their ranks.

== By country ==
=== Belgium ===
- Special Forestry Platoon – A Belgian Army non-combat penal platoon composed of Flemish soldiers who had some relationship with the Flemish Movement during World War I. Formed in 1918, the unit conducted woodchopping in Orne, Normandy, France as a form of penal labour until several months after the end of the war.

=== Bolivia ===
- 50th Infantry Regiment – A Bolivian Army penal regiment composed of convicted soldiers and police officers that served in the Chaco War.

=== Finland ===
- Erillinen pataljoona 21 ("Separate Battalion 21") – A Finnish Army penal battalion founded in August 1941, from volunteering prisoners and leftists in administrative detention, that fought in the Continuation War (the Finnish-Soviet front of WWII 1941-1944). Commanded by Major Nikke Pärmi, the distinguishing mark of Er.P 21 was the black V sewn into the sleeve of their uniform; these gave them the nicknames of "Pärmi's Devils" and "Black Arrow".

=== France ===
- Régiment pénal de l'Île de Ré ("French Penal Regiment of Île de Ré") – One of five regional penal units forming part of the French Army in the early 1810s. Formed in 1811, the unit was stationed on Île de Ré, and was disbanded in 1814 during the First Restoration.
- Battalions of Light Infantry of Africa (Bataillons d'Infanterie Légère d'Afrique) – Penal battalions serving in French North Africa, composed of men with prison records who still had to complete their military service, and serving soldiers with serious disciplinary problems. Formed in 1832, this corps was disbanded in 1972.
- Bataillon d'Infanterie légère d'Outre-Mer ("Overseas Light Infantry Battalion") – A penal battalion consisting of German prisoners of war and French collaborationists after World War II. Formed in 1948 for service in the French colonies, the unit attracted few members and was subject to a campaign by the French Communist Party before it was disbanded in 1949.
- Disciplinary Company of the Foreign Regiments in the Far East (Compagnie disciplinaire en Extrême-Orient) – A penal company of the French Foreign Legion in the Far East, consisting of Legionnaires who had committed serious offenses. Formed in 1946 and attached to the 2nd Foreign Infantry Regiment, the company depended on the battalions implanted in French Indochina. After French Indochina's dissolution following the 1954 Geneva Conference, the company was disbanded in August 1954.

=== Germany ===
- Strafbataillon ("Penal Battalion") – A generic term for penal units in the Wehrmacht, fielded between 1942 and 1945. These units were poorly armed and often undertook what were essentially suicide missions.
- 999th Light Afrika Division – A Wehrmacht penal division stationed in Tunisia, originating from the 999th Africa Brigade in 1942. The unit consisted of individuals who held, or were perceived to hold, anti-fascist beliefs. The unit suffered heavy casualties in the North African campaign, and members were reportedly so unwilling to fight for Germany that they quickly surrendered their positions to Allied troops when confronted. After the unit transferred to Axis-occupied Greece, several members defected or began conducting anti-Nazi activities. The unit was disbanded in 1943.
- Dirlewanger Brigade – A Waffen-SS penal unit consisting of convicted criminals and military who were not expected to survive their service. Formed in 1940 as an experimental sharpshooter consisted of convicted poachers, it later were deployed for counterinsurgency where it became notorious even among the Waffen-SS for the sheer depravity of its war crimes, being responsible for several mass murders in Eastern Europe.

=== Italy ===
- Cacciatori Franchi ("Free Hunters") – The penal unit of the Royal Sardinian Army. Established around 1741, the unit existed until 1878, when disciplinary companies were established.
- Battaglione di Rigore ("Penalty Battalion") – The penal unit of the Italian Social Republic military.
- Battaglioni degli Imprigionati ("Battalions of the Imprisoned") – Penal battalions of the Redshirts in the Wars of Italian Unification, composed of prisoners and revolutionaries.

=== Paraguay ===
- Macheteros de Jara - An auxiliary cavalry regiment that was created on 15 August 1932. Members of the regiment consisted of former outlaws.

=== Russia ===
- Storm-Z – a group of penal military units established in April 2023, during the Russian invasion of Ukraine
- Storm-V – a group of penal military units established in June 2023, during the Russian invasion of Ukraine

=== South Korea ===
- Unit 684 – A black operations unit of the Republic of Korea Air Force, consisting largely of petty criminals. Formed in 1968 in response to the Blue House raid, wherein Unit 124 of the Korean People's Army Special Operation Force attempted to assassinate South Korean President Park Chung Hee, Unit 684 received extremely harsh training on the island of Silmido in anticipation for a retaliatory operation to assassinate North Korean General Secretary Kim Il Sung. However, warming relations by 1971 led to the mission's cancellation and the unit's dissolution; the members of Unit 684 promptly launched a violent escape attempt, culminating in a standoff that led to the deaths of most of the unit and the capture and execution of the remaining survivors.

=== Soviet Union ===
- Shtrafbat – Penal battalions of the Red Army and NKVD, composed of sentenced soldiers, political prisoners, and others deemed to be expendable, fighting on the Eastern Front of World War II. Established in 1942 by Joseph Stalin in Order No. 227, over 422,000 prisoners were placed into shtrafbats until their disestablishment following victory in Europe in May 1945, by which point very few had survived.

=== Ukraine ===
- Kharakternyky Battalion – Nicknamed "The Magicians" and "Characterniks" the battalion was formed after the Verkhovna Rada passed Registered draft law No. 11079 which allowed for the mobilization of convicts into the Ukrainian Army.
- Shkval Battalion – Formed after the Verkhovna Rada passed Registered draft law No. 11079 which allowed for the mobilization of convicts into the Ukrainian Army. Unlike other Ukrainian penal units, it is a series of units rather than a single formation.
- Prisoners' Battalion – The battalion was formed after the Verkhovna Rada passed Registered draft law No. 11079 which allowed for the mobilization of convicts into the Ukrainian Army. It is attached to the 92nd Assault Brigade.

=== United States ===
- Galvanized Yankees – A term used to refer to Confederate States Army and Confederate States Navy former personnel and prisoners of war who, after their capture, swore allegiance to the Union and enlisted in the Union Army and Union Navy during the American Civil War. The practice of enlisting Confederate prisoners to Union forces began around 1862 and lasted until 1866. A similar practice was conducted by the Confederate States of America, but not to the same extent.

== In popular culture ==
- The Dirty Dozen – A 1967 film about the titular fictional American penal unit, composed of military prisoners trained as commandos for a suicide mission ahead of the Normandy landings during World War II. The film was a commercial and critical success, and was followed by several television film sequels in the 1980s: The Dirty Dozen: Next Mission, The Dirty Dozen: The Deadly Mission, and The Dirty Dozen: The Fatal Mission.
- Silmido – A 2003 film dramatizing the story of Unit 684. The film is credited with having increased public awareness of Unit 684's story, though some aspects of the film are fictionalized due to numerous details of the actual story remaining classified.
- Battlefield: Bad Company and Battlefield: Bad Company 2 – Video games with single player campaigns focused on the fictitious "B" Company of the 222nd Army battalion, referred to as "Bad Company," which is composed of troublemaking soldiers.
- Ace Combat 7: Skies Unknown – A 2019 combat flight simulation video game, part of which follows "Spare Squadron", a penal squadron of the fictional Osean Federation's air force that is considered disposable and used to test enemy combat drone defenses, overseen by a prison warden serving as their commander and airborne early warning and control operator.
- Suicide Squad – A fantastical version of the concept within the DC Comics universe, featuring reformed former supervillains sent on high-risk suicidal missions by A.R.G.U.S. Director Amanda Waller for the US government.
- Steel Division II – A 2019 strategy video game which includes Shtrafniki as a playable unit.

== See also ==
- Military prison
