= Strafbataillon =

Military penal unit of the Wehrmacht

- Strafbattalion military prisoner badge
- Active: 1942–1945
- Disbanded: 8 May 1945
- Country: Nazi Germany
- Branch: German Army
- Type: Penal military unit
- Role: Forward observer Mine-clearing line charge Raid; Suicide mission

Strafbataillon (lit. 'penal battalion') is the generic term for penal units that were created from prisoners during the Second World War in all branches of the Wehrmacht. Soldiers, criminals and civilians sentenced to those units were generally poorly armed and required to undertake dangerous high-casualty missions. The Strafbataillon were operated and administered by the Feldgendarmerie, the German military police.

By 1943, the course of the war had turned against Nazi Germany. Military losses and the need to maintain discipline by example made the German High Command order that further punishment units should be formed from the thousands of Wehrmacht military prisoners that were held in its military prisons. The Strafbataillon, which were under the control of the Feldgendarmerie, were then used to conduct dangerous operations (sometimes akin to suicide missions) for the Heer, such as clearing minefields, assaulting difficult objectives and defending positions against overwhelming attacking forces. They were also made to do hard manual labor in frontline locations, building and repairing military infrastructure and defenses.

Prisoners who survived their missions would be deemed "fit to fight" and returned to the field with the "rights" of a combat soldier. Although most Strafbataillon personnel were used on the Eastern Front, some were sent to the Ardennes, on the Western Front during the last major German offensive, in December 1944.

== Formation ==
The Strafbataillon were developed from the Sonderabteilungen (English: special departments) that existed in pre-war Nazi Germany. Initially, Nazi policy was to rebuild the armed forces by keeping "potential troublemakers" away from the troops and removing any "destructive elements" from military service. But on 21 May 1935, Adolf Hitler decreed that under the new Nazi Defence Act, any conscript who was deemed "unfit for military service because of subversive activity" would be arrested. However, soldiers who were deemed disruptive to military discipline, but were otherwise "worthy of service", would be sent to military Sonderabteilungen.

Those units were designed to change attitudes toward state and national policy while instilling a sense of duty, honor and purpose. Those goals were to be achieved through harsh discipline and punishments, extensive indoctrination programs, and restrictions on home leave. Troops who conformed were eventually transferred to regular units. However, those who continued to show indiscipline or opposed the military were transferred to Sachsenhausen concentration camp. Before World War II, there were nine Sonderabteilungen within the Wehrmacht in Nazi Germany. According to estimates, between 3000 and 6000 Wehrmacht personnel passed through those special departments. A total of 320 "incorrigible rogues" were transported to concentration camps.

However, with the outbreak of war in 1939, the Sonderabteilungen were disbanded. They were replaced with the Feld-Sonder Battalion (English: Special Field Battalion) under the control of the Feldgendarmerie. However, as the war continued, the need for more military personnel grew accordingly. Military tribunals were directed by the OKW to send incarcerated members of the Wehrmacht, as well as "subversives", to Bewährungsbataillone (English: probation battalions) at the front.

== Bewährungsbataillon 500 ==
The 500th Probation Battalion was created by a secret Führer directive in December 1940. The order stated that any first-time convicted soldier could return to his unit after he had served a portion of his sentence in "a special probation corps before the enemy". However, recidivist criminals and hardcore elements in the German prison system were not allowed to join those units. Beginning in April 1941, convicted soldiers – even those sentenced to death – who had shown exceptional bravery or meritorious service, were allowed to rejoin their original units. However, those in probation units were expected to undertake dangerous operations at the front. Refusal entailed execution of the original sentence. Those who did refuse were labeled "criminal entities" and sent to the harsh moorland labor camps in Emsland in Lower Saxony. There was a strong incentive to join Bewährungsbataillon because convicted soldiers lost both their honor and citizen rights. The only way to get those rights back was probation in Bewährungsbataillon 500.

During World War II, more than 27,000 soldiers served a probation period in a Bewährungsbataillon unit. They were monitored and commanded by selected officers, NCOs, and assigned enlisted men, who made up a quarter of the total strength. Although battle losses were high, the desire to win the right to leave probation meant combat morale was high. Major operations conducted by Bewährungsbataillone on the Eastern Front included Kamianka, Ukraine, as well as at Gruzino and Sinyavino, near Leningrad.

== Bewährungstruppe 999 ==
In October 1942, the 999th Light Afrika Division was formed from civilian criminals and prison inmates who had been deemed "unfit for military service". They were encouraged to volunteer on the promise that all past crimes would be wiped out by exemplary bravery in combat. However, anyone who refused to join the Bewährungstruppe (English: probation troop) would stay in prison without rights to parole, or be sent to a concentration camp.

A third of the 28,000 troops who joined the division were political prisoners from Baumholder and Heuberg. The 999th Light Afrika Division initially fought in North Africa and later in the Soviet Union. Some units were also used as garrison troops in Greece and in the fight against partisans in the Balkans. Several hundred soldiers from the division deserted to the Allies. In September 1944, some troops from the 999th, including Falk Harnack and Gerhard Reinhardt, took active part in armed resistance with the Greek Liberation Army (ELAS).

== Final years ==
In the final years of the war, order within all branches of the Wehrmacht was upheld by a specially-formed military police, the Feldjägerkorps. These military police units, which had seniority over all other Feldgendarmerie, were formed from combat-decorated officers and NCOs. Possessing the direct authority from the OKW, they had the power to maintain control and discipline throughout all the German armed forces including the SS. The Feldjägerkorps had the authority in the field to summarily execute officers or enlisted men for any breach of military discipline, order or duty. By September 1944, all soldiers and recruits who received a sentence of deferred execution in a drumhead court-martial were sent directly to Strafbataillons. Numbers rapidly increased as the war drew to a close in May 1945

== In popular culture ==
Danish writer, Sven Hassel, uses the Strafbataillon in many of his novels about the Wehrmacht on the Eastern Front.

The fictional unit of disgraced German paratroopers, who are sent to kidnap British Prime Minister Winston Churchill in The Eagle Has Landed, by Jack Higgins, are also recruited from a Wehrmacht penal unit.

In the German TV miniseries Generation War, Wilhelm, who deserts from the Wehrmacht, is sentenced to serve in Bewährungsbataillon 500.

In the 1993 German war film Stalingrad, several members of a platoon (including the platoon commander) are sentenced to serve in a penal battalion. They are reinstated to their former unit and ranks after successfully holding off a Soviet attack.

The critically acclaimed Soviet war drama film Come and See has parts which depict Holocaust warcrimes by Nazi troops, including penal units.

== See also ==
- Geheime Feldpolizei, the Wehrmacht's secret police service
- 500th SS Parachute Battalion (SS-Fallschirmjägerbataillon 500) was the parachute unit of the Waffen-SS employed in dangerous actions behind enemy lines. It was decided to extend enlistment to those in the SS disciplinary units which were formed from officers, non-commissioned officers and soldiers who had problems with military law. An order of the SS-FHA (the SS High Command) fixed a percentage of 50% for the unit coming from volunteers of Waffen-SS units, the rest from volunteers from the disciplinary units.
- SS-Sonderkommando Dirlewanger – A notorious unit better known as the Dirlewanger Brigade, led by Oskar Dirlewanger. Its cadre was initially formed from military prisoners and POWs but also had a high number of criminals (including rapists, child molesters, murderers, political prisoners and those that had been committed to asylums for the criminally insane). On 15 February 1945, it was upgraded into 36th Waffen Grenadier Division of the SS and Dirlewanger was replaced by its tactical commander, Brigadeführer Fritz Schmedes.
- Shtrafbat, prisoner battalions run by the NKVD in World War II
