= Shtrafbat =

Soviet penal battalions of World War II (Eastern Front)

Shtrafbats (Russian: штрафбат, штрафной батальон) were Soviet penal battalions that fought on the Eastern Front in World War II.

The shtrafbats were greatly increased in number by Joseph Stalin in July 1942 via Order No. 227 (Директива Ставки ВГК № 227). Order No. 227 was a desperate effort to re-instill discipline after the panicked routs of the first year of combat with Germany. The order—popularized as the "Not one step back!" (Ни шагу назад!, Ni shagu nazad!) Order—introduced severe punishments, including summary execution, for unauthorized retreats.

In his order, Stalin also mentioned Hitler's successful use of penal battalions (also known as Strafbataillon) as a means to ensure obedience among regular Wehrmacht units.

== Organization ==
Pursuant to Order No. 227, the first penal battalions were originally authorized a strength of 800 men; penal companies were also authorized, consisting of between 150 and 200 men per company. In addition to the battalions already serving with Armies, other battalions, subordinated to Fronts (the equivalent of Army Groups), were introduced. The first penal battalion deployed under the new policy was sent to the Stalingrad Front on August 22, 1942, shortly before German troops reached the Volga river. It consisted of 929 disgraced officers convicted under Order No. 227 who had been demoted to the lowest enlisted rank and assigned to the penal battalion. After three days of assaults against the Germans, only 300 remained alive.

The order entitled 'Status of Penal Units of the Army' (Положение о штрафных батальонах действующей армии) of November 26, 1942, by Georgy Zhukov (then a Deputy Commander-in-Chief), formally standardized Soviet penal units. Penal battalions or shtrafbats were set at 360 men per battalion, and were commanded by mid-range and senior Red Army officers and political officers (politruks). Penal companies (штрафная рота, 100 to 150 per unit) were commanded by sergeants (NCOs) and privates.

Penal units consisted of two types of personnel: permanent and temporary. Permanent personnel were staff officers, company commanders, platoon leaders, political officers, and other junior commanders. Temporary personnel were the shtrafniki (punishees) who were sent to the unit for their crimes or wrongdoings in order to redeem themselves with their service.

In some penal units like the 8th Separate Penal (Officer) Battalion, platoons sometimes had up to 50 men, companies comprised 300 men, and the battalion could be as big as 850 men; which implies that a penal battalion was sometimes larger than a regular rifle battalion of the Red Army. Note that on paper, the battalion was to be commanded by a Colonel with two deputies, a chief of staff, and a political officer. The companies were to be commanded by Majors and their platoons by Captains. This is probably because in this instance, the shtrafniki consisted of former officers of the Red Army.

The total number of people convicted to penal units from September 1942 to May 1945 was 422,700.

== Categories ==
Men ordinarily subject to penal military unit service included:

- Those convicted of desertion or cowardice under Order No. 227. While cowardice under fire was sometimes punished with instant execution, soldiers or officers in rear areas suspected of having a "reluctance to fight" could (and frequently were) summarily stripped of rank and reassigned to a shtrafbat under Order 227.
- Soviet Gulag labor camp inmates.

=== Infantry battalions ===
Penal battalion service in infantry roles was the most common use of shtrafniki, and viewed by many Soviet prisoners as tantamount to a death sentence. The term of service in infantry penal battalions and companies was from one to three months (the maximum term was usually applied to those qualifying for the death penalty, the standard punishment for Order No. 227). Standard rates of conversion of imprisonment terms into penal battalion terms existed. Convicts sentenced to infantry units were eligible for commutation of sentence and assignment to a Red Army line unit if they either suffered a combat injury (the crime was considered to be "cleansed in blood") or had accomplished extremely heroic deeds in combat. They could also theoretically receive military decorations for outstanding service and if released were considered fully rehabilitated, though those suspected of political disloyalties remained marked men and often continued to be persecuted after the war's end.

Different commanders had different attitudes when releasing the shtrafniks from the unit and returning them to their regular units. 65th Army commander General Pavel Batov only rehabilitated shtrafniks who were killed or wounded in action and used the remaining shtrafniks until the end. General Alexander Gorbatov released all shtrafniks who had bravely fought in a battle, regardless of whether they were wounded or not.

=== Air force ===
Pilots or gunners serving in air force penal squadrons (at one point known as корректировочная авиационная эскадрилья (corrective aviation squadrons)) were at a marked disadvantage in obtaining the remission of sentence via a combat injury since the nature of air combat usually meant that any injury was fatal. Pilots received no credit for missions flown, and were normally kept in service until they were killed in action. Former Soviet Air Force pilot Artyom Afinogenov recalled the use of air force penal squadrons near Stalingrad:

Penal squadron pilots were sent to the most dangerous places, first of all, to Volga bridge crossings, where the future of Stalingrad was decided, to air fields and enemy tank concentrations. So it was only penal squadrons that were sent to attack these targets, yet these operational flights were not taken into consideration. You keep flying missions and killing Germans, yet it is held that nothing happens, so nothing goes on your record. To be released from penal service you have to be wounded in fighting. But when a military pilot is flying a mission, the first wound he receives may very often be the last one.

The death rate among gunners serving in penal squadrons was exceptionally high. While prisoners assigned as gunners could theoretically clear their sentences after surviving ten missions, like the infantry they were frequently transferred to penal mine-clearing units before reaching this total.

== Combat service ==
Pursuant to Order No. 227, any attempt to retreat without orders, or even a failure to advance was punished by barrier troops ('zagraditel'nye otriady') or "anti-retreat" detachments of the Soviet counterintelligence organization known as SMERSH (Smert shpionam), Russian for "Death to spies". Blocking detachments positioned at the rear would use heavy-handed discouragement towards retreat, but the most likely way that a soldier or officer would interact with a barrier troop was not through being cut down by a Maxim, but through arrest and drumhead court martial. As a result, with nowhere else to go, the penal battalions usually advanced in a frenzy, running forwards until they were killed by enemy minefields, artillery, or heavy machine-gun fire. If the men survived and occupied their objective, they were rounded up and used again in the next assault. In some cases, shtrafniks performed their duty very well even though there were no barrier troops blocking the unit's rear.

The battalions were headed by staffs or ordinary soldiers and officers. While out of the line, discipline was enforced by an armed guard company, backstopped by NKVD or SMERSH detachments. Staff and guards were highly paid and got special pension benefits for their unpleasant and sometimes dangerous work. During the war, Soviet penal units were widely employed. Some units achieved considerable fame.

The simultaneous formation of penal units and ancillary rearguard blocking troops in Order No. 227 has occasionally led to a modern misconception that penal units were rearguarded by regular units of the Red Army. Although the practice of using regular army troops as a rearguard or blocking force was briefly implemented, it was soon discovered that the rearguard did not always carry out their orders with regards to penal unit personnel who retreated or fled from the Germans. Consequently, until the end of the war, the task of preventing unauthorized withdrawal of penal unit personnel from the battlefield was handled by the anti-retreat SMERSH detachments of the Soviet Red Army.

== See also ==
- Barrier troops, used by the Red Army to prevent panic or unauthorized withdrawal by front line soldiers.
- Strafbattalion, the prisoner battalions in the German Wehrmacht during World War II.
- Russian penal military units, similar prisoner battalions established in modern Russia during the invasion of Ukraine
- Ukrainian penal military units similar prisoner battalions established in by Ukraine during the Russian Invasion of Ukraine

== Bibliography ==
- Conquest, Robert, Kolyma: The Arctic Death Camps, Methuen Press, (1978) ISBN 978-0-670-41499-4
- Hatch, Gardner N., American Ex-prisoners of War: Non Solum Armis, Turner Publishing Company, (1988), ISBN 978-1-56311-624-7
- Krivosheev, G.F. Soviet Casualties and Combat Losses in the Twentieth Century, London, Greenhill Books, 1997, ISBN 978-1-85367-280-4, available online (in Russian) .
- Lebed, Alexander (Gen.), My Life and My Country, Regnery Publishing (1997) ISBN 978-0-89526-422-0
- Manazeev, Igor, A 'Penal' Corps on the Kalinin Front, Journal of Slavic Military Studies, Vol. 15, Issue 3, September 2002 OCLC 201968754
- Mawdsley, Evan, The Stalin Years: The Soviet Union 1929–1953, Manchester University Press (2003), ISBN 978-0-7190-6377-0
- Pyl'cyn, Aleksandr, Penalty Strike: The Memoirs of a Red Army Penal Company Commander, 1943–45, Stackpole Books (2006), ISBN 978-0-8117-3599-5
- Suvorov, Viktor, Inside the Soviet Army, Hamish Hamilton (1982), ISBN 0-241-10889-6
- Tolstoy, Nikolai, Stalin's Secret War, New York: Holt, Rinehart & Winston (1981), ISBN 0-03-047266-0
