= Stop-loss policy =

US military service extension policy

In the United States military, stop-loss is the involuntary extension of a service member's active duty service under the enlistment contract in order to retain them beyond their initial end of term of service (ETS) date and up to their contractually agreed end of active obligated service (EAOS). It is separate from the cessation of a permanent change of station (PCS) move for a member still in military service (a process known as stop-move). Stop-loss was used immediately before and during the 1990–91 Persian Gulf War. Since then, it has been used during deployments to Somalia, Haiti, Bosnia, Kosovo and after the September 11 attacks and the subsequent war on terror.

The policy has been legally challenged several times. However, federal courts have consistently found that military service members contractually agree that their term of service may be involuntarily extended until the end of their obligated service.

== Definition ==
Stop-loss was created by the United States Congress after the Vietnam War. Its use is founded on Title 10, United States Code, Section 12305(a) which states in part: "... the President may suspend any provision of law relating to promotion, retirement, or separation applicable to any member of the armed forces who the President determines is essential to the national security of the United States" and Paragraph 10(c) of DD Form 4/1 (The Armed Forces Enlistment Contract) which states: "In the event of war, my enlistment in the Armed Forces continues until six (6) months after the war ends, unless the enlistment is ended sooner by the President of the United States."

During enlistment in any branch of the U.S. Armed Forces, all service members are required to sign an initial contract with an eight-year service obligation. The enlistment contract for a person going on active duty generally stipulates an initial period of active duty from two to six years, followed by service in a reserve component of the Armed Forces of the United States for the remainder of the eight-year obligation. Service members whose ETS, retirement, or end of service obligation date falls during a deployment may be involuntarily extended until the end of their unit's deployment.

== Controversy ==
The controversy regarding stop-loss focuses mainly on the aspect involving "involuntary extension" of a service member's initial active duty service obligation. For service members opposed to involuntary extension, it represents implementation of a desultory clause in their contract which alters their expectation of an end of term of service date. It also exposes them to the risk of an additional or prolonged combat deployment. For opponents, "involuntary extension" is contrary to the notion of voluntary service and undermines popular support for the conflict.

In a campaign speech in 2004, then-presidential candidate John Kerry described stop-loss as a "backdoor draft." The use of stop-loss has been criticized by activists and some politicians as an abuse of the spirit of the law, on the basis that Congress has not formally declared war.

During August 2007, Iraq Veterans Against the War, an activist organization of former and current service members, announced a national "Stop the Stop-Loss" campaign at a press conference where they were holding a week-long vigil in a tower erected on the National Mall in Washington, D.C. Other anti stop-loss vigils occurred in Bellingham, Washington, and Colorado Springs, Colorado.

On March 10 and 11, 2008, a group of college students from the organization Our Spring Break, supported by Code Pink and Iraq Veterans Against the War, as well as several other organizations, issued symbolic stop-loss "orders" to every member of both the United States House of Representatives and the United States Senate in protest of both the practice of stop-lossing, and of the Iraq War. On March 12, 2008, the students "enforced" the orders by blocking off the exits to the parking garages of the Rayburn House Office Building and the Hart Senate Office Building.

=== Legal challenges ===
The first time a court decision mentioned the Pentagon's stop-loss policy was a 1991 decision in the case of Craig L. Sherman. Sherman was a sergeant in the U.S. Air Force under an enlistment contract that explicitly limited his active duty service to four years. But, in 1990, at the commencement of Operation Desert Storm, President George H.W. Bush issued Executive Order 12722, declaring a national emergency, and Executive Order 12728, which delegated to the Secretary of Defense, who could redelegate further, the President's authority under 10 U.S.C. § 673c, authorizing the President to suspend any provision of law relating to military retirement or separation of anyone determined to be essential. It was pursuant to this provision and executive order that Craig was, after some confusion, ordered to Saudi Arabia. He filed a petition for habeas corpus, based on 50 App. U.S.C. § 454(c)(1), which forbids involuntary extensions of enlistments unless Congress (not merely the President) declares war or a national emergency. The Court noted that Craig was relying on 50 App. U.S.C. § 454(c)(1), while the government was relying on 10 U.S.C. § 673c, the two provisions apparently in conflict. The Court sided with the government, primarily on the ground that 10 U.S.C. 673c was enacted more recently than 50 App. U.S.C. §454(c)(1), based on the presumptions that Congress was aware of the earlier law when it enacted the later law, and that the later law effectively amended or repealed the earlier law notwithstanding the sections were in different locations in the codification. Further, the Court was reluctant, when the provisions were in evident conflict, to impair the President's ability to respond to a matter of national security.

The first legal challenge to the contemporary stop-loss policy came in August 2004, with a lawsuit by David Qualls, a National Guardsman in California. Qualls argued the military breached his enlistment contract by involuntarily extending his term of service. However, his arguments were rejected by Judge Royce C. Lamberth and the case was dismissed. Qualls' case was not appealed.

In October 2004, a "John Doe" lawsuit was filed by an anonymous National Guardsman facing stop-loss, challenging the validity of the law that authorized it. This suit was dismissed at trial and the court's findings were upheld by the Ninth U.S. Circuit Court of Appeals. The Ninth Circuit also rejected a similar appeal in Santiago v. Rumsfeld in May 2005.

=== Government response ===
Former Secretary of Defense Robert Gates, as one of his first acts in his position (he assumed the office December 18, 2006), penned a memo compelling commanders to "minimize" the stop-lossing of soldiers.

The United States Army states that enlisted soldiers facing stop-loss can now voluntarily separate by request, under provision 3–12, but only after they complete an involuntary deployment of 12–15 months and 90 days stabilization time (time allowed to "out-process" from the military) can they apply.

This refers to an Army policy dated September 5, 2002. It allowed enlisted soldiers under stop-loss to voluntarily separate on the first anniversary of their original expiration of service or ETS date (under twelve-month stop-loss); officers and warrant officers, not retirement eligible, to apply to leave one year from the end of their original service obligation date; officers and warrant officers without a service obligation to request separation 12 months after they were first affected by stop-loss; and retirement-eligible soldiers to apply for retirement one year from their original retirement eligibility date (defined as 20 years active federal service) or one year from when stop-loss took effect if the soldier was retirement eligible on the effective date of stop-loss.

Despite Secretary Gates's order, by April 2008 use of stop-loss had increased by 43%. Soldiers affected by stop-loss were then serving, on average, an extra 6.6 months, and sergeants through sergeants first class made up 45% of these soldiers. From 2002 through April 2008, 58,300 soldiers were affected by stop-loss, or about 1% of active duty, Reserve, and National Guard troops.

In March 2009, Gates ordered a deep reduction in the number of personnel affected by the stop loss policy, announcing a goal "to reduce that number by 50 percent by June 2010 and to bring it down to scores or less by March 2011."

== In the media ==
In the 2005 "Witches of Mass Destruction" episode of American television series Boston Legal, Alan Shore represents a client suing the US military for the loss of her brother, who had to stay in Iraq beyond the time specified in his National Guard service contract due to the stop-loss program.

A film titled Stop-Loss, released March 2008, details the fictional story of a soldier (played by actor Ryan Phillippe) who goes absent without leave from the military after being notified he is being stop-lossed.

In the September 2008 season 2 premiere of the Canadian television series The Border, three fictional American soldiers desert to Canada by swimming the Niagara River, using stop-loss as their legal basis for refugee status.

In the 2010 episode "Moving the Chains" of the American television series House, a patient confesses to Gregory House that he has been served with a stop-loss order after completing his enlistment service.

In 2015, stop-loss was used as a plot device in an episode of The Last Ship. When 16 men wanted to get off the ship, one enlisted member's contracted enlistment was already three weeks overdue. If he had not been allowed to jump ship, he would have considered himself to have been stop-lossed.

== See also ==
- Conscription in the United States
- Felony waiver
- Individual augmentee policy: term used by the Department of Defense for their program of selecting Air Force and Navy Personnel and deploying them to a combat zone.
- Ready Reserve
