= Barrier troops =

Military unit tasked to prevent retreat of allied forces

Barrier troops, blocking units, or anti-retreat forces are military units that are located in the rear or on the front line (behind the main forces) to maintain military discipline, prevent the flight of servicemen from the battlefield, capture spies, saboteurs and deserters, and return troops who flee from the battlefield or lag behind their units. Barrier troops differ from military police, as barrier troops exert their effect through physical presence near specific allied units, as a preventative measure against retreat and other actions, whereas military police apprehend and control those who have already done so, typically in a wider area.

== Combat effectiveness ==
Research has found that barrier troops can prevent some soldiers from fleeing the battlefield, but comes with substantial adverse effects (such as higher casualties and reduced initiative) that make it bad for combat effectiveness on the whole. According to Jason Lyall, barrier troops are more likely to be used by the militaries of states that discriminate against the ethnic groups that comprise the state's military.

== Confederate States Army ==
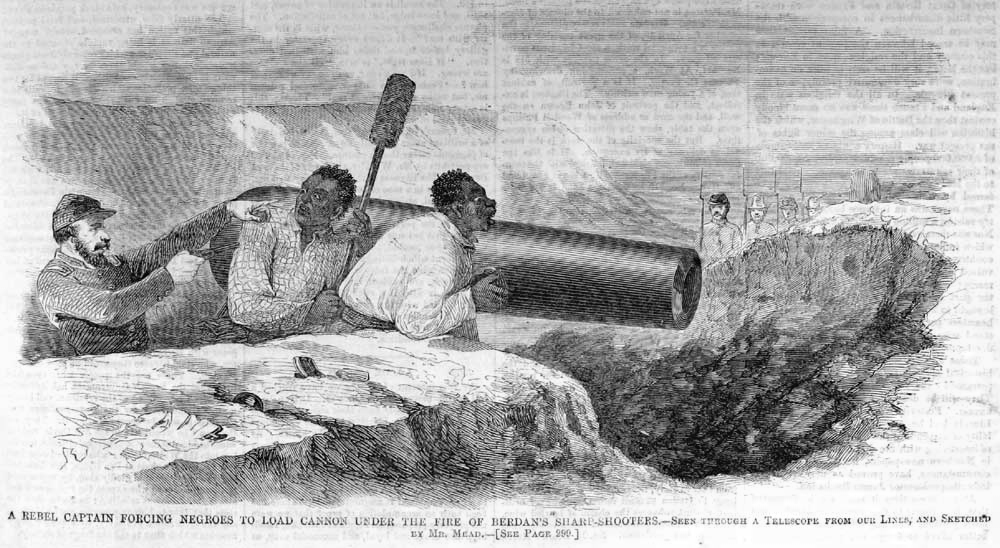
An 1862 illustration of a Confederate officer forcing slaves at gunpoint to fire a cannon at Union soldiers during a battle.

During the American Civil War, some Confederates were reported to have forced their African American slaves to fire upon Union soldiers while holding them at gunpoint. According to John Parker, a slave who was forced by the Confederates to fight Union soldiers at the First Battle of Bull Run, "Our masters tried all they could to make us fight... They promised to give us our freedom and money besides, but none of us believed them; we only fought because we had to". During the siege of Yorktown, Confederate artillery crews started to force black slaves at gunpoint to load artillery cannons. This was in response to the 1st United States Sharpshooters regiment which had inflicted heavy casualties on Confederate artillerymen during the siege. An officer of the regiment reported, "They forced their negroes to load their cannon. They shot them if they would not load the cannon, and we shot them if they did."

== Croatian Home Guard ==
During World War II, some Ustaše militia units were deployed on the flanks of suspect Croatian Home Guard units in order to prevent mass desertions during combat actions against the Yugoslav Partisans.

== National Revolutionary Army ==
During the Battle of Nanking of the Second Sino-Japanese War, a battalion in the 36th Division of the National Revolutionary Army (NRA) of China was stationed at the Yijiang Gate with orders to guard the gate and "let no one through". On 12 December 1937, the NRA collapsed in the face of an offensive by the Imperial Japanese Army (IJA), and various units attempted to retreat without orders through the gate. The battalion responded by opening fire and killing a large number of the retreating NRA units and fleeing civilians.

== Soviet Red Army ==
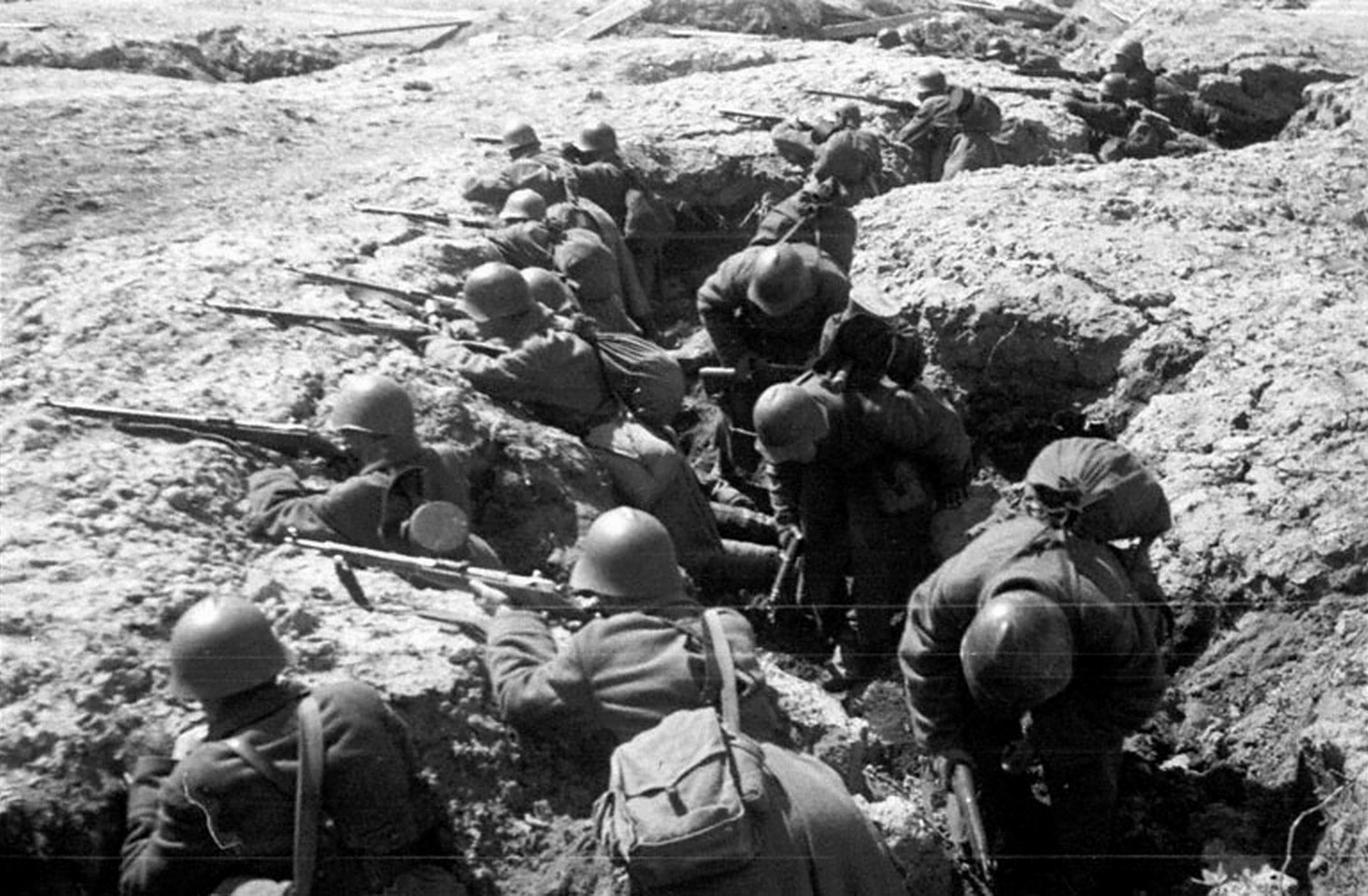
Soldiers of a blocking detachment firing from a trench at German troops on the Leningrad Front, June 1942

In the Red Army of the Russian SFSR and later the Soviet Union, the concept of barrier troops first arose in August 1918 with the formation of the заградительные отряды (zagraditelnye otriady), translated as "blocking troops" or "anti-retreat detachments" (Russian: заградотряды, заградительные отряды, отряды заграждения). The barrier troops comprised personnel drawn from the Cheka secret police punitive detachments or from regular Red Army infantry regiments.

The first use of the barrier troops by the Red Army occurred in the late summer and fall of 1918 in the Eastern front during the Russian Civil War, when People's Commissar of Military and Naval Affairs (War Commissar) Leon Trotsky of the Communist Bolshevik government authorized Mikhail Tukhachevsky, the commander of the 1st Army, to station blocking detachments behind unreliable Red Army infantry regiments in the 1st Red Army, with orders to shoot if front-line troops either deserted or retreated without permission.

In December 1918, Trotsky ordered that detachments of additional barrier troops be raised for attachment to each infantry formation in the Red Army. On 18 December he cabled:

How do things stand with the blocking units? As far as I am aware they have not been included in our establishment and it appears they have no personnel. It is absolutely essential that we have at least an embryonic network of blocking units and that we work out a procedure for bringing them up to strength and deploying them.

The barrier troops were also used to enforce Bolshevik control over food supplies in areas controlled by the Red Army as part of Lenin's war communism policies, a role which soon earned them the hatred of the Russian civilian population.

In 1919, 612 "hardcore" deserters of the total 837,000 draft dodgers and deserters were executed following Trotsky's measures. According to Figes, "a majority of deserters (most registered as "weak-willed") were handed back to the military authorities, and formed into units for transfer to one of the rear armies or directly to the front". Even those registered as "malicious" deserters were returned to the ranks when the demand for reinforcements became desperate". Figes also noted that the Red Army instituted amnesty weeks to prohibit punitive measures against desertion which encouraged the voluntary return of 98,000-132,000 deserters to the army.

The concept was re-introduced on a large scale during the Second World War. On 27 June 1941, in response to reports of unit disintegration in battle and desertion from the ranks in the Soviet Red Army, the 3rd Department (military counterintelligence of Soviet Army) of the People's Commissariat of Defense of the Soviet Union (NKO) issued a directive establishing mobile barrier forces composed of NKVD secret police personnel to operate on roads, railways, forests, etc. for the purpose of catching "deserters and suspicious persons". With the continued deterioration of the military situation in the face of the German offensive of 1941, NKVD detachments acquired a new mission: to prevent the unauthorized withdrawal of Red Army forces from the battle line. The first troops of this kind were formed in the Bryansk Front on 5 September 1941.

On 12 September 1941 Joseph Stalin issued the Stavka Directive No. 1919 (Директива Ставки ВГК №001919) concerning the creation of barrier troops in rifle divisions of the Southwestern Front, to suppress panic retreats. Each Red Army division was to have an anti-retreat detachment equipped with transport totaling one company for each regiment. Their primary goal was to maintain strict military discipline and to prevent disintegration of the front line by any means. These barrier troops were usually formed from ordinary military units and placed under NKVD command.

In 1942, after Stavka Directive No. 227 (Директива Ставки ВГК №227), issued on 28 July 1942, set up penal battalions, anti-retreat detachments were used to prevent withdrawal or desertion by penal units as well. Penal military unit personnel were always rearguarded by NKVD anti-retreat detachments, and not by regular Red Army infantry forces. As per Order No. 227, each Army should have had 3–5 barrier squads of up to 200 persons each.

A report to the Commissar General of State Security (NKVD chief) Lavrentiy Beria on 10 October 1941 noted that since the beginning of the war, NKVD anti-retreat troops had detained a total of 657,364 retreating, spies, traitors, instigators and deserting personnel, of which 25,878 were arrested (of which 10,201 were sentenced to death by court martial and the rest were returned to active duty).

At times, barrier troops were involved in battle operations along with regular soldiers, as noted by Aleksandr Vasilevsky in his directive N 157338 from 1 October 1942.

Order No. 227 also stipulated the capture or shooting of "cowards" and fleeing panicked troops at the rear of the blocking detachments, who in the first three months shot 1,000 penal troops and sent 24,993 more to penal battalions. By October 1942, the idea of regular blocking detachments was quietly dropped, and on 29 October 1944 Stalin officially ordered the disbanding of the units, although they continued to be utilized in a semi-official capacity until 1945.

=== Practice and results of use ===
According to an official letter addressed in October 1941 to Lavrentiy Beria, in the period between the beginning of Operation Barbarossa to early December 1941, NKVD detachments had detained 657,364 servicemen who had fallen behind their lines and fled from the front. Of these detainees, 25,878 were arrested, and the remaining 632,486 were formed in units and sent back to the front. Among those arrested included accused 1505 spies, 308 saboteurs, 2621 traitors, 2643 "cowards and alarmists", 3987 distributors of "provocative rumors", and 4371 others. 10,201 of them were shot, meaning approximately 1.5% of those arrested were sentenced by military tribunals to death.

Richard Overy mentions the total number of those sentenced to be shot during the war was 158,000.

For a thorough check of the Red Army soldiers who were in captivity or surrounded by the enemy, by the decision of the State Defense Committee No. 1069ss of 27 December 1941, army collection and forwarding points were established in each army and special camps of the NKVD were organized. In 1941–1942, 27 special camps were created, but in connection with the inspection and shipment of verified servicemen to the front, they were gradually eliminated (by the beginning of 1943, only 7 special camps were operating). According to Soviet official data, 177,081 former prisoners of war and surrounded men were sent to special camps in 1942. After checking by special departments of the NKVD, 150,521 people were transferred to the Red Army.

On 29 October 1944, Order No. 0349 of the People's Commissar for Defense I. V. Stalin, the barrage detachments were disbanded due to a significant change in the situation at the front. Personnel joined the rifle units.

== Spanish Republican Army ==
Throughout the Spanish Civil War, soldiers and officers of the Spanish Republican Army were executed for retreating without orders to do so. During the Battle of Seseña, Republican troops killed commanding officer Ildefonso Puigdendolas after he attempted to use barrier troops against his own men. On 24 July 1937 during the Battle of Brunete, 400 men of the 11th Division were shot after the division (according to the division's chief Soviet advisor) "lost its head and fled". During the Battle of the Ebro, Republican high command ordered their soldiers to resist against Nationalist counterattacks and not to retreat while executing any soldiers or officers who retreated.

== Syrian Arab Army ==
It has been reported that in the initial stages of the Syrian civil war, regular soldiers sent to subdue protesters were surrounded by an outer cordon manned by forces known to be loyal to the Assad regime, with orders to shoot those who refused their orders or attempted to flee.

== Russian Armed Forces ==
According to the UK Defense Ministry, barrier troops threatening to shoot their own retreating soldiers were introduced into the Russian army in late 2022 in order to compel offensives in the Russian invasion of Ukraine. Fedir Venislavsky, a member of the Ukrainian parliament's committee on national security and defence claimed that the Russian Ground Forces used Chechen personnel from the 141st Special Motorized Regiment as barrier troops to shoot deserters who tried to leave combat zones. In October 2022, Ukrainian intelligence published a purported phone call where a Russian soldier described both his task of killing inmates, recruited from prisons by the Wagner Group, if they were retreating, and how he would be killed by others if he himself retreated. In March 2023, international intelligence community InformNapalm shared intercepted conversations from Russian servicemen, suggesting ″barrage detachments″ or ″anti-retreat forces″ threatening the soldiers with death if they do not proceed with their offensive. In a video appeal to Russian President Vladimir Putin published on 25 March 2023, members of a unit tasked with assaulting Vuhledar claimed that their commanders were utilizing anti-retreat troops to force them to advance or risk being shot. In October 2023 member of Russian Duma Gennady Semigin openly praised the Kadyrovite units' role as barrier troops in Ukraine. In response, he faced widespread criticism and accusations that he implies Russian soldiers are cowardly.

In July 2025, CNN reported that Russian commanders were ordering subordinates to be tied up to trees and abandoned as a punishment for desertion, leaving them vulnerable to drones. The practice has been recorded by Ukrainian drones, as well as by Russian soldiers and then circulated on social media. In October 2025, TVP World reported on a Telegram post by the Defense Forces of Southern Ukraine, who claimed that a Russian soldier was killed by a grenade dropped from a Russian drone while attempting to surrender. In February 2026, the Ukrainian I Want to Live initiative reported that two Russian soldiers were targeted by Russian FPV drones as they were moving under drone escort toward Ukrainian positions after surrendering to the 24th Separate Mechanized Brigade, killing one of them while the other managed to reach the positions unharmed. According to I Want to Live, such incidents are not isolated and the Russian army actively promotes a concept of "heroic death", where attempting to surrender is treated as betrayal or weakness.

== In film ==
The 2001 film Enemy at the Gates shows Soviet Red Army commissars and barrier troops using a PM M1910 alongside their own small arms to gun down the few retreating survivors of a failed charge on a German position during the Battle of Stalingrad. The film misrepresents the role of blocking detachments in the Red Army. Although there was Order No. 227 (Russian: Директива Ставки ВГК №227) that became the rallying cry of "Not a step back!" (Russian: Ни шагу назад!, romanized: Ni shagu nazad!), machine gunners were not placed behind regular troops with orders to kill anyone who retreated, and they were used only for penal troops. As per Order No. 227, each detachment would have between three and five barrier squads per 200 personnel.

The 2011 South Korean film My Way also depicts Soviet blocking troops shooting retreating soldiers during a charge.

The 2020 Chinese film The Eight Hundred depicts Nationalist Soldiers shooting deserters during the Battle of Shanghai.
