= Order No. 227 =

1942 military command issued by Soviet Union leader Joseph Stalin

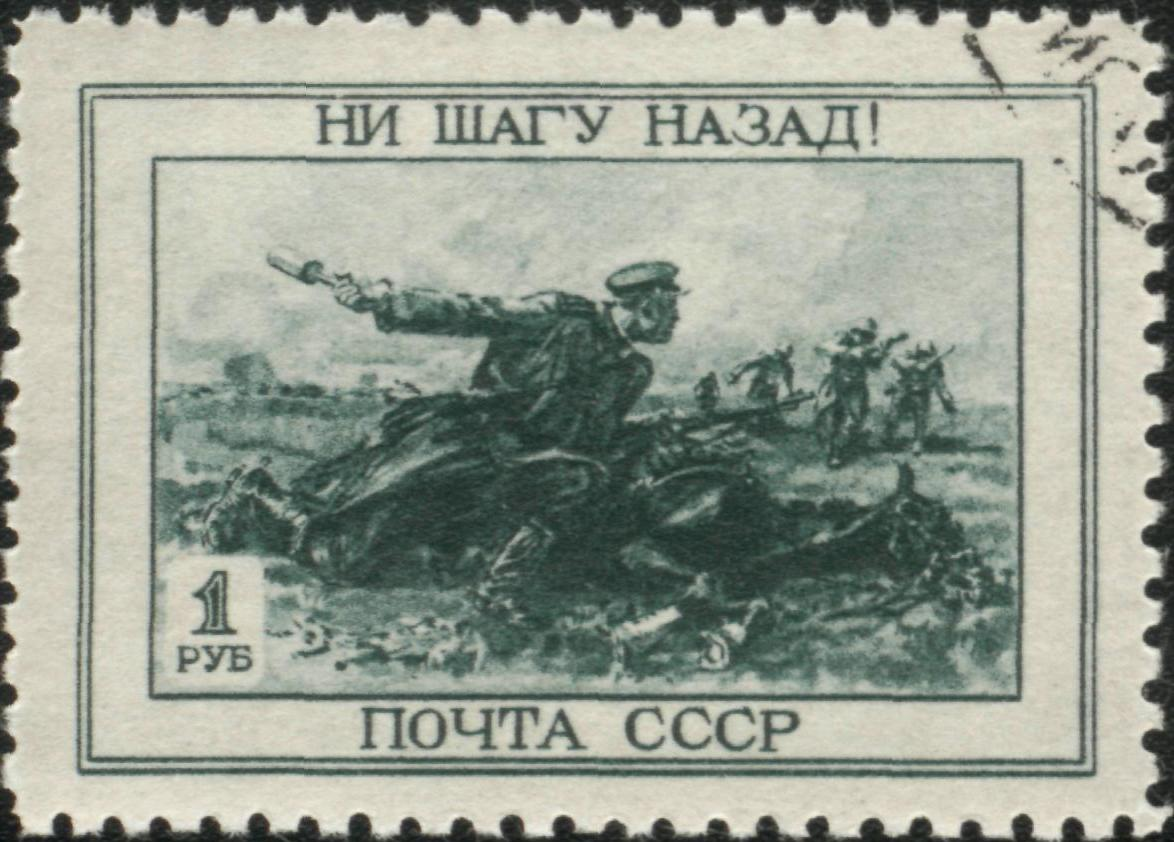
Soviet postage stamp of April 1945 depicting a politruk throwing a grenade with the phrase "Not a Step Back!".

Order No. 227 (Russian: Приказ № 227, romanized: Prikaz No. 227) was an order issued on 28 July 1942 by Joseph Stalin, who was acting as the People's Commissar of Defence. It is known for its line "Not a step back!" (Russian: Ни шагу назад!, romanized: Ni shagu nazad!), which became the primary slogan of the Soviet press in summer 1942.

Order No. 227 established that each front must create one to three penal battalions (Russian: штрафной батальон, romanized: shtrafnoy batalyon, lit. 'penalty battalion', commonly known as штрафбат, shtrafbat) of up to 800 middle-ranking commanders and high-ranking commanders accused of disciplinary problems, which were sent to the most dangerous sections of the front lines. From 1942 to 1945, a total of 422,700 Red Army personnel were sentenced to penal battalions as a result of courts-martial. The order also directed that each army must create "blocking detachments" at the rear that would shoot "panic-mongers and cowards". In the first three months, blocking detachments shot 1,000 penal troops and sent 24,000 to penal battalions. By October 1942, the idea of regular blocking detachments was unofficially dropped.

Intended to galvanise the morale of the hard-pressed Red Army and emphasize patriotism, it had a generally detrimental effect and was not consistently implemented by commanders who viewed diverting troops to create blocking detachments as a waste of manpower. On 29 October 1944, blocking detachments were officially disbanded by Stalin's order No. 349 citing the changed situation at the front.

== History ==
During the first part of the war on the Eastern Front, the Soviets suffered heavy losses along with mass retreat and desertion. Stalin released order No. 227 intending to re-establish discipline in the Red Army in the battle against the Wehrmacht and Waffen-SS:

Moscow, Nr. 227, July 28, 1942

The enemy throws new forces to the front without regard to heavy losses and penetrates deep into the Soviet Union, seizing new regions, destroying our cities and villages, and violating, plundering and killing the Soviet population. Combat goes on in region Voronezh, near Don, in the south, and at the gates of the Northern Caucasus. The German invaders penetrate toward Stalingrad, to Volga and want at any cost to trap Kuban and the Northern Caucasus, with their oil and grain. The enemy already has captured Voroshilovgrad, Starobelsk, Rossosh, Kupyansk, Valuyki, Novocherkassk, Rostov on Don, half Voronezh. Part of the troops of the Southern front, following the panic-mongers, have left Rostov and Novocherkassk without severe resistance and without orders from Moscow, covering their banners with shame.

The population of our country, who love and respect the Red Army, start to be discouraged in her and lose faith in the Red Army, and many curse the Red Army for leaving our people under the yoke of the German oppressors, and itself running east.

Some fools at the front calm themselves with talk that we can retreat further to the east, as we have a lot of territory, a lot of ground, a lot of population and that there will always be much bread for us. They want to justify the infamous behaviour at the front. But such talk is a falsehood, helpful only to our enemies.

Each commander, Red Army soldier and political commissar should understand that our means are not limitless. The territory of the Soviet state is not a desert, but people – workers, peasants, intelligentsia, our fathers, mothers, wives, brothers, children. The territory of the USSR which the enemy has captured and aims to capture is bread and other products for the army, metal and fuel for industry, factories, plants supplying the army with arms and ammunition, railways. After the loss of Ukraine, Belarus, Baltic republics, Donetzk, and other areas we have much less territory, much fewer people, bread, metal, plants and factories. We have lost more than 70 million people, more than 800 million pounds of bread annually and more than 10 million tons of metal annually. Now we do not have predominance over the Germans in human reserves, in reserves of bread. To retreat further – means to waste ourselves and to waste at the same time our Motherland.

Therefore it is necessary to eliminate talk that we have the capability endlessly to retreat, that we have a lot of territory, that our country is great and rich, that there is a large population, and that bread always will be abundant. Such talk is false and parasitic, it weakens us and benefits the enemy, if we do not stop retreating we will be without bread, without fuel, without metal, without raw material, without factories and plants, without railways.

This leads to the conclusion, it is time to finish retreating. Not one step back! Such should now be our main slogan.

It goes on to state that The Supreme General Headquarters of the Red Army commands:

1. Military councils of the fronts and first of all front commanders should:

a) Unconditionally eliminate retreat moods in the troops and with a firm hand bar propaganda that we can and should retreat further east, and that such retreat will cause no harm;
b) Unconditionally remove from their posts and send to the High Command for court-martial those army commanders who have allowed unauthorized troop withdrawals from occupied positions, without the order of the Front command.
c) Form within each Front from one up to three (depending on the situation) penal battalions (800 persons) where commanders and high commanders and appropriate commissars of all service arms who have been guilty of a breach of discipline due to cowardice or bewilderment will be sent, and put them on more difficult sectors of the front to give them an opportunity to redeem by blood their crimes against the Motherland.

2. Military councils of armies and first of all army commanders should;

a) Unconditionally remove from their offices, corps and army commanders and commissars who have accepted troop withdrawals from occupied positions without the order of the army command, and route them to the military councils of the fronts for court-martial;
b) Form within the limits of each army 3 to 5 well-armed defensive squads (up to 200 persons in each), and put them directly behind unstable divisions and require them in case of panic and scattered withdrawals of elements of the divisions to shoot in place panic-mongers and cowards and thus help the honest soldiers of the division execute their duty to the Motherland;
c) Form within the limits of each army up to ten (depending on the situation) penal companies (from 150 to 200 persons in each) where ordinary soldiers and low ranking commanders who have been guilty of a breach of discipline due to cowardice or bewilderment will be routed, and put them at difficult sectors of the army to give them an opportunity to redeem by blood their crimes against the Motherland.

3. Commanders and commissars of corps and divisions should;

a) Unconditionally remove from their posts commanders and commissars of regiments and battalions who have accepted unwarranted withdrawal of their troops without the order of the corps or division commander, take from them their orders and medals and route them to military councils of fronts for court martial;
b) Render all help and support to the defensive squads of the army in their business of strengthening order and discipline in the units.

This order is to be read in all companies, cavalry squadrons, batteries, squadrons, commands and headquarters.

The People’s commissioner of Defense

J. Stalin

== Effect ==
Marshal of the Soviet Union, Aleksandr Vasilevsky, wrote: "...Order N 227 is one of the most powerful documents of the war years due to its patriotic and emotional content... the document was motivated by rough and dark times... while reading it we were thinking to ourselves if we were doing everything it takes to win the battle."

Each front had to create penal companies for privates and NCOs. By the end of 1942, there were 24,993 troops serving in penal battalions, which increased to 177,694 in 1943. The number decreased over the next two years to 143,457 and 81,766 soldiers in 1944 and 1945, respectively. The total of Red Army personnel sentenced by courts-martial was 994,300, with 422,700 assigned to penal battalions and 436,600 imprisoned after sentencing. Not included are 212,400 deserters, who were not found and escaped the custody of the military districts.

In the first three months, blocking detachments shot 1,000 penal troops and sent 24,000 to penal battalions. According to an internal list of the NKVD from October 1942, 15,649 soldiers were picked up by the restricted forces who fled the front line on the Stalingrad Front from August 1, 1942, to October 15, 1942. Of these, 244 soldiers were imprisoned, 278 were shot, 218 were sent to penal companies, 42 to penal battalions and 14,833 to return to their units. By October 1942, the idea of regular blocking detachments was unofficially dropped.

Pages of Order No. 227

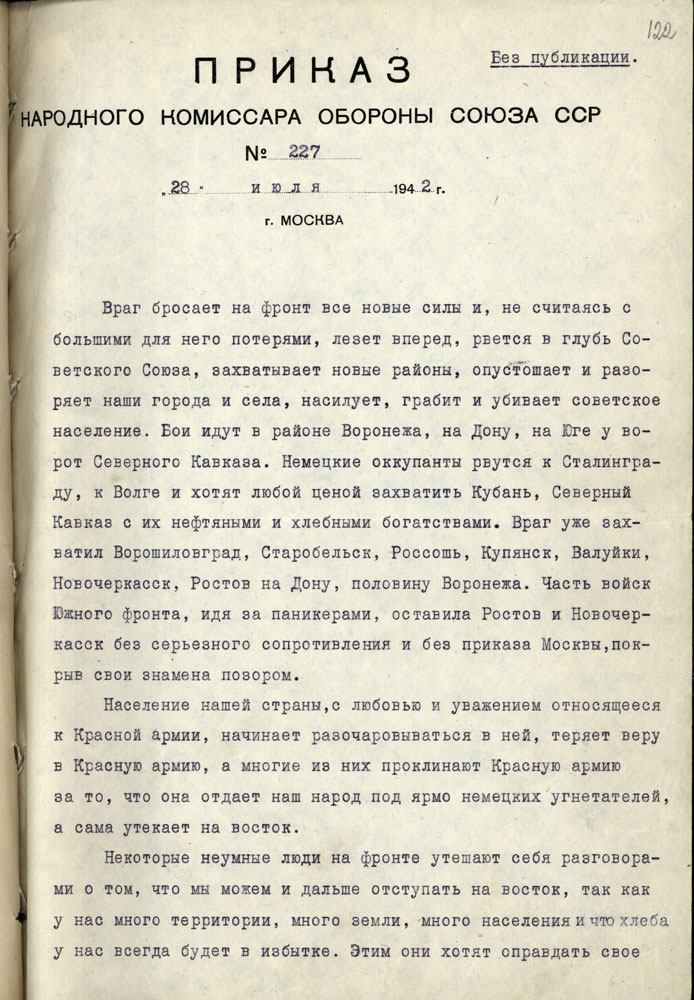
Page 1

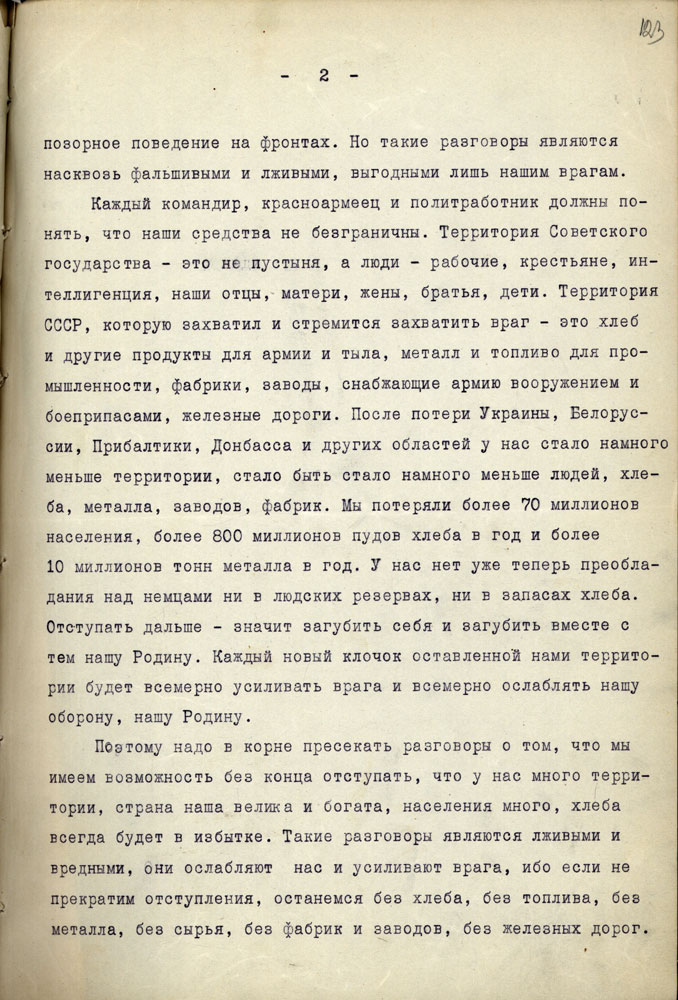
P. 2

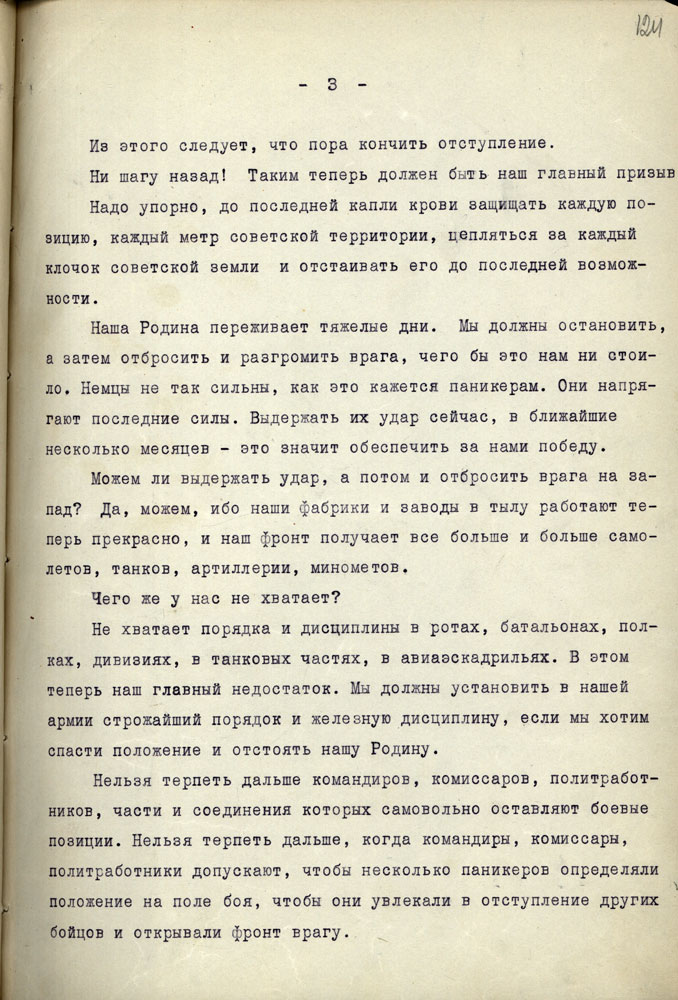
P. 3

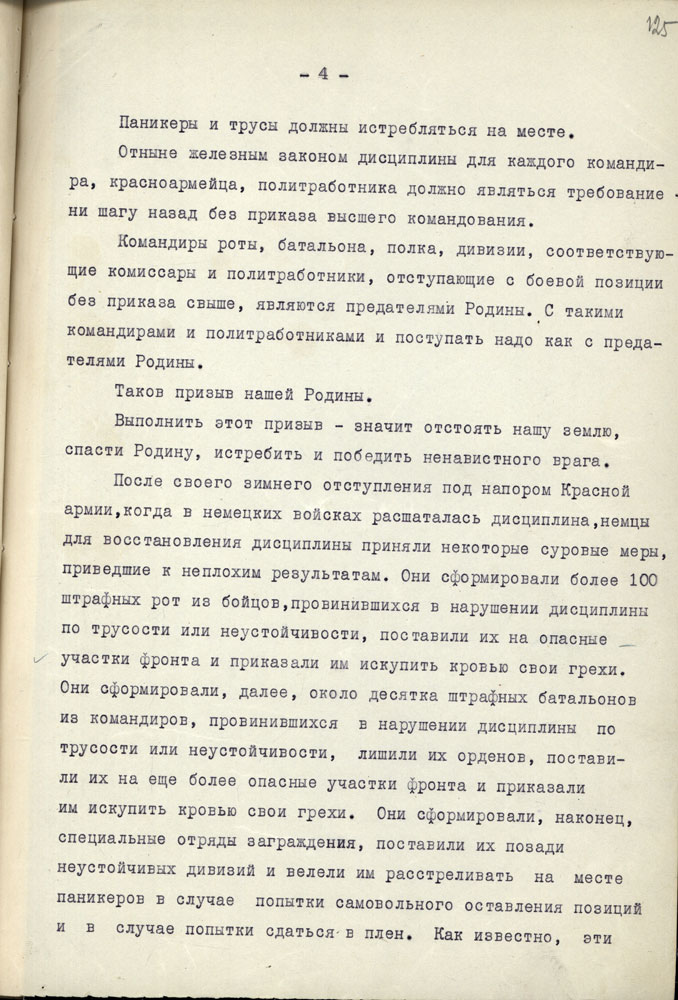
P. 4

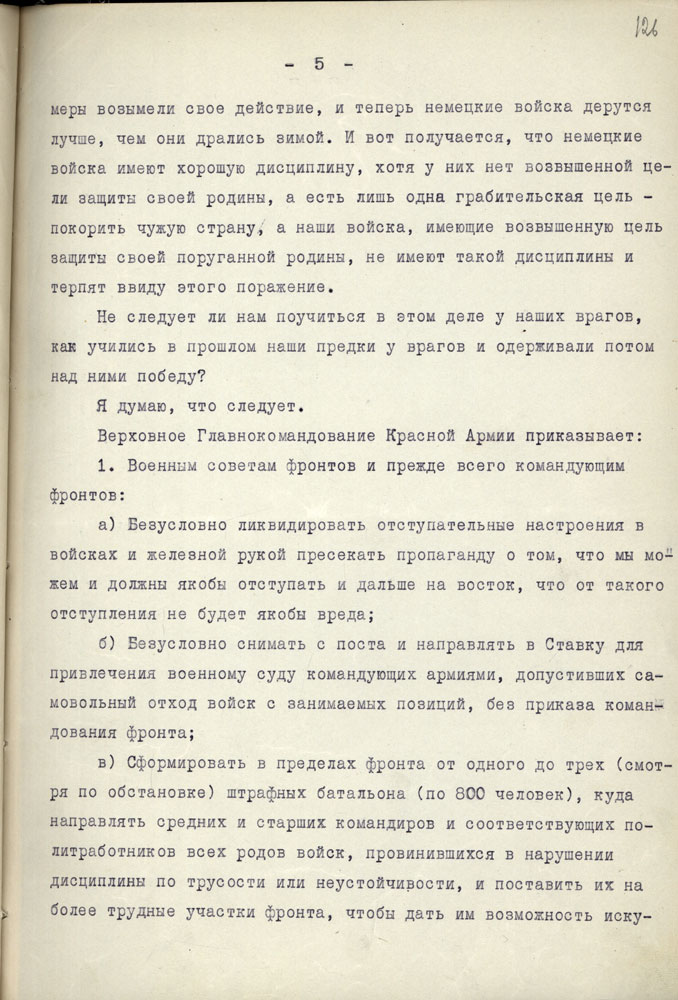
P. 5

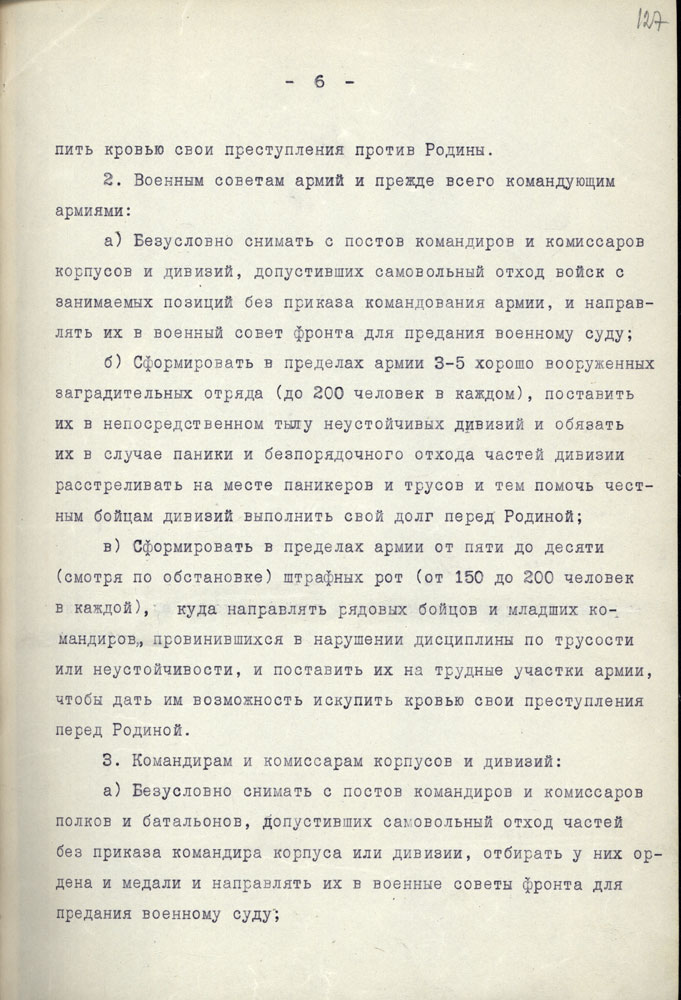
P. 6

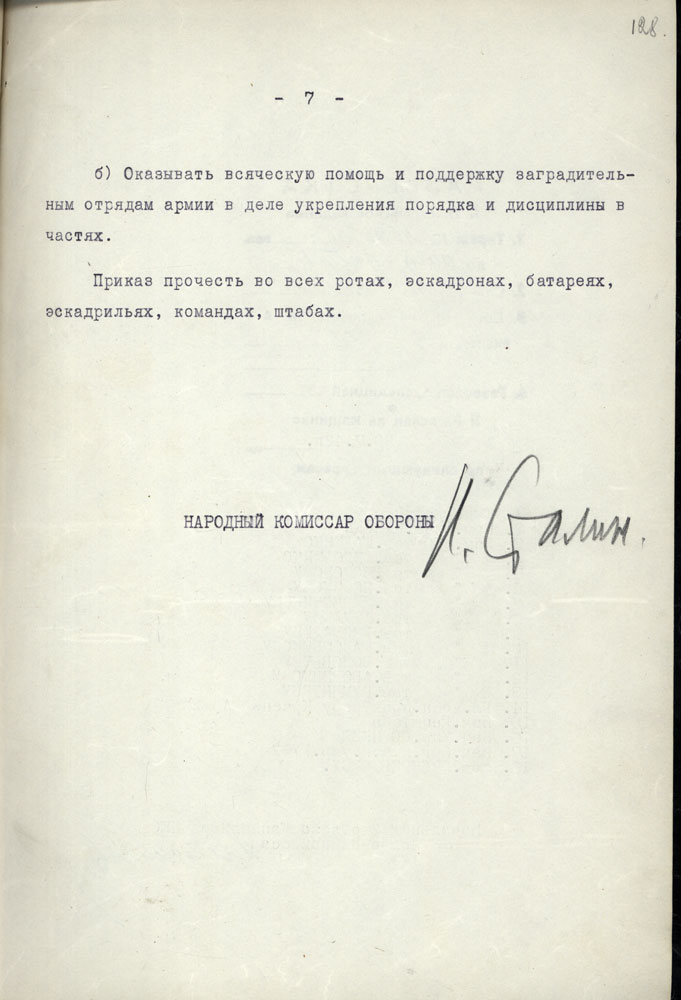
P. 7

== See also ==
- Order No. 270
- They shall not pass
- Battle of Stalingrad
- Last stand
- List of last stands
