= Felony waiver =

A felony waiver is special permission granted to a United States military recruit with a felony on their criminal record. Some crimes that are considered to be misdemeanors according to the law of the state in which they were committed may be considered felonies according to the Uniform Code of Military Justice and therefore require a felony waiver. Occupations requiring high level security clearances are usually closed to individuals seeking felony waivers. They are increasingly being issued by the U.S. Army and U.S. Marine Corps to bolster forces that are strained by the demands of the ongoing war on terror. This is a more common practice today than in the past, along with the usage of the stop-loss policy.

Former US Representative Henry Waxman of California served as chairman of the House Oversight and Government Reform Committee. Upon releasing data focused on felony waivers, Waxman acknowledged public sentiment regarding the usage of felony waivers, stating that "Concerns have been raised that the significant increase in the recruitment of persons with criminal records is a result of the strain put on the military by the Iraq war and may be undermining military readiness."

== Usage ==
United States military recruiting standards vary according to branch; however, most felonies are excluded from the felony waiver. A felony that occurs below the age of criminal responsibility is more likely to be waived; likelihood decreases if the felony occurred as an adult. According to the U.S. Army, "In either case it all comes down to the type of offense and how long ago it was."

Waivers must be approved by an officer who is ranked as a brigadier general or above, and recruits must have written recommendations and endorsements from community leaders illustrating they would be a good candidate for military service.

== Frequency ==
Data released by the U.S. House Committee on Oversight and Government Reform showed the number of soldiers admitted to the Army with felony records doubled from 249 in 2006 to 511 in 2007. The number of Marines with felonies rose from 208 to 350. According to the U.S. Army, 15 percent of recruits needed waivers in the 12-month period ending on September 30, 2006; 18 percent of the recruits needed them in the fiscal year ending September 30, 2007. The total number of sailors who received felony waivers was 48 in 2006 and 42 in 2007. There were no Air Force recruits with waivers for felony convictions in 2007.

=== Crimes ===
In 2007 more than half of the Army's 511 convictions were for theft-related offenses ranging from burglaries to bad checks and motor vehicle theft. Another 130 were for drug offenses. The remainder included two for manslaughter; five for sexual crimes, including rape, incest or sexual assault; and three for negligent or vehicular homicide. Two received waivers for terroristic threats, in 2007.

235 of the Marine Corps' 350 waivers were for various types of thefts in 2007, and another 63 were for assaults or robberies that may also have included use of a weapon. The remainder included one for manslaughter in 2007; four for sex crimes; and five for terroristic threats, including bomb threats. The Navy's convictions were mostly for a variety of thefts or drug and drunk driving convictions, with two for threats in 2007.

== See also ==
- Military recruitment
