= 50th Infantry Regiment (Bolivia) =

Bolivian infantry regiment

- Active: 1932 – 1935
- Allegiance: Bolivia
- Type: Penal battalion
- Role: Infantry
- Nickname: Knives of Death
- Engagements: Chaco War

Commanders
- Notable Commanders: Colonel Bernardino Bilbao Rioja

The 50th Infantry Regiment (Cuchilleros de la Muerte) was a Bolivian infantry regiment that fought in the Chaco War. Nicknamed the Knives of Death (Spanish: Cuchillos de la Muerte), the regiment relied almost exclusively on the use of blade weapons, particularly bayonets. The personnel were recruited from Bolivian prisons and under command from army and police officers. Their targets were Paraguayan isolated patrols and astray soldiers.

The regiment was established by Bolivian Colonel Bernardino Bilbao Rioja after his men found the remains of 20 bodies of Bolivian soldiers, hacked to death by members of the Paraguayan Macheteros de Jara. As retaliation, the Bolivian Army recruited rogue police and military officers and a number of seasoned criminals into the new regiment, whose mission was to harass and spread panic among Paraguayan troops in the rearguard.

== See also ==
- Macheteros de Jara - Paraguayan equivalent and predecessor.
