= Macheteros de Jara =

Cavalry regiment during the Chaco War

- Active: 15 August 1932 – 1935
- Allegiance: Paraguay
- Type: Penal battalion
- Role: Cavalry
- Engagements: Chaco War

Commanders
- Notable Commanders: Don Plácido Jara

The Macheteros de Jara was an auxiliary cavalry regiment that was organized in August 15, 1932, before the Battle of Boquerón began. The regiment was recruited from former outlaws from Paraguay who fought against Bolivian officers and soldiers.

It was an irregular unit whose mission was to prevent the Bolivian army from supplying provisions and ammunition to the defenders of Boquerón. When Boquerón had fallen they dedicated themselves to the assault and plunder of small ranches. All the attacks were led by Commander Don Plácido Jara who targeted isolated Bolivian troops and supplies. The Macheteros de Jara was nicknamed after its founder and the machete, the Paraguayan soldiers favorite weapon for hand-to-hand combat. The mission of this unit was to cause panic in the Bolivian rearguard by hacking soldiers to death with machetes; body parts and heads were allegedly hung on trees to demoralize Bolivian officers and soldiers. The macheteros also slaughtered cattle that could potentially feed the Bolivian troops.

== See also ==
- 50th Infantry Regiment (Bolivia) - Bolivian equivalent.
