= Battle of Chasiv Yar =

Battle in the Russo-Ukrainian war from 2024 to 2025

- Part of the eastern front of the Russo-Ukrainian war (2022–present)
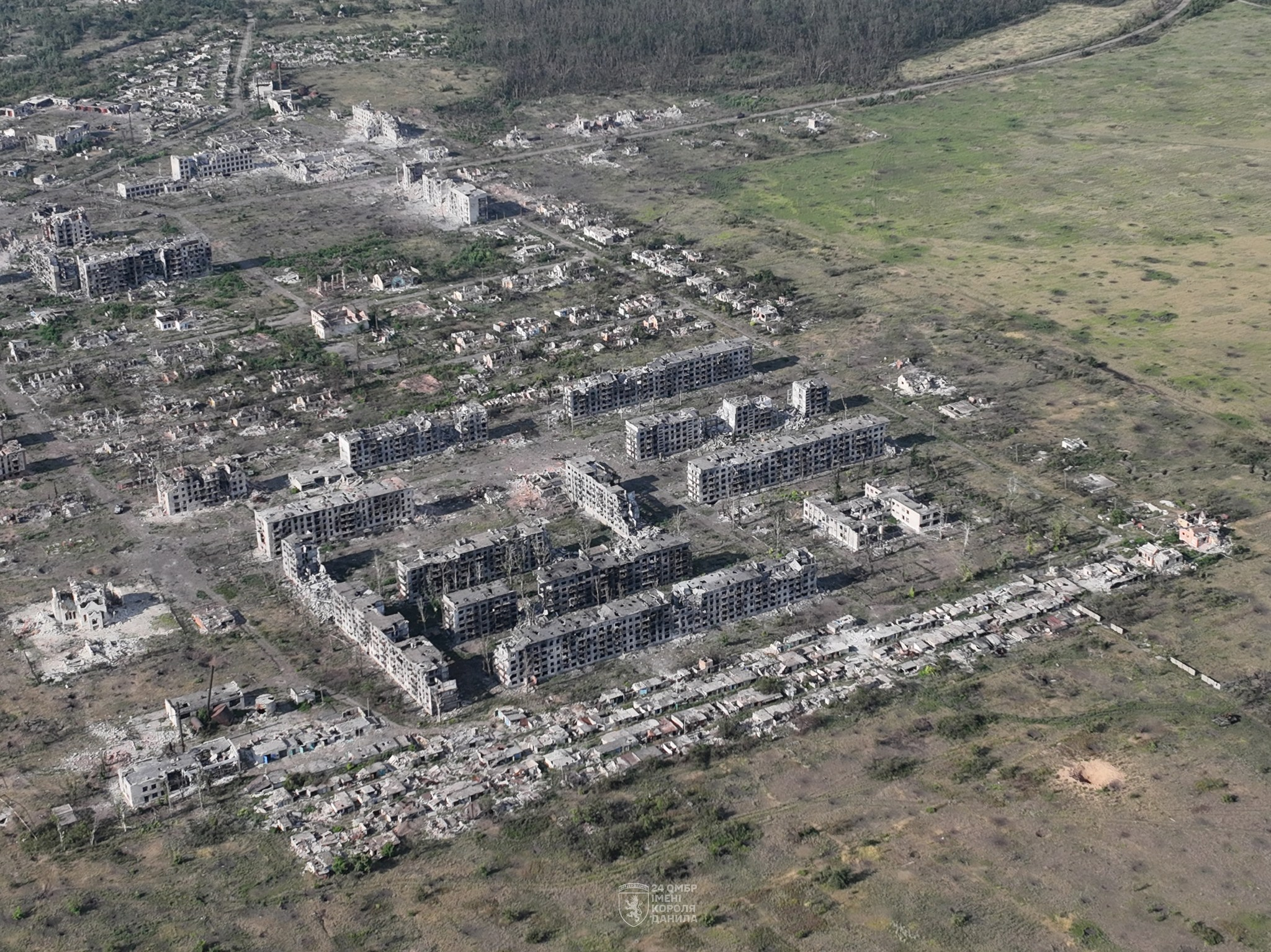
- View of Chasiv Yar during the battle in August 2024
Date	4 April 2024 – Present (2 years, 5 months, 4 weeks and 1 day)
Location	Chasiv Yar (and surrounding villages), Donetsk Oblast, Ukraine
Status	Ongoing
Territorial changes	Russian forces capture most of Chasiv Yar

Belligerents
Russia	Ukraine

Units involved
Russian Armed Forces; Russian Ground Forces; 51st Combined Arms Army; 58th Spetsnaz Battalion; "Pyatnashka" International Volunteer Brigade; "Night Wolves" drone detachment; 132nd Motorized Rifle Brigade; "Okhotnik" Spetsnaz Detachment; 3rd Combined Arms Army; 4th Separate Motorized Rifle Brigade; 2nd Motorized Rifle Territorial Defense Battalion; "Akhmat" Spetsnaz group; 7th Motorized Rifle Brigade; 3rd Army Corps; 4th Motorized Rifle Brigade; 17th Artillery Brigade; 6th Motorized Rifle Division; 1008th Motorized Rifle Regiment; 8th Combined Arms Army; 150th Motorized Rifle Division; 102nd Motorized Rifle Regiment; 58th Guards Combined Arms Army; 42nd Guards Motor Rifle Division; 78th Special Purpose Motorized Regiment "Sever-Akhmat"; 49th Combined Arms Army; 7th Military Base; Russian Airborne Forces; 11th Guards Air Assault Brigade; 98th Guards Airborne Division; 5th Guards Anti-Aircraft Missile Regiment; 217th Guards Airborne Regiment; 299th Guards Parachute Regiment; 331st Guards Airborne Regiment; 1065th Artillery Regiment; 215th Reconnaissance Battalion; Russian Navy; 14th Army Corps; 200th Separate Motor Rifle Brigade; Storm-Z; Storm-V; National Guard of Russia; Kadyrovites; "Hispaniola" Volunteer Brigade; "Irbis" detachment; Volki Brigade; 1st Assault Detachment; Russian PMC; Redut; Other Russian volunteer Corps; "Sever-V" Brigade; "Vostok-V" brigade; "Burevestnik" volunteer detachment; 5th "Terek" Cossack Reconnaissance Brigade; "Rodnya" Battalion; "Nevsky" Volunteer Reconnaissance-Assault Brigade	Armed Forces of Ukraine; Ukrainian Ground Forces; 92nd Assault Brigade; 67th Mechanized Brigade; 5th Assault Brigade; 24th Mechanized Brigade; 26th Artillery Brigade; Pomsta Brigade; Kraken Regiment; Luhansk Assault Regiment; Khyzhak Brigade; International Legion; Revanche Tactical Group

The Battle of Chasiv Yar is a military engagement in the Russo-Ukrainian war between the Russian Armed Forces and the Armed Forces of Ukraine for control of the city of Chasiv Yar and surrounding villages. The battle began on 4 April 2024 with the first direct assault on the city by Russian forces, and has thus far seen the capture of the district east of a canal passing through the city, the crossing of the canal, and the claimed capture of the city as of early August 2025. As of December 2025, the Institute for the Study of War reported continued fighting in the city

Due to its defensible elevated terrain and strategic location in Donetsk Oblast, Chasiv Yar is regarded as a pivotal provincial city for either army to control. According to analysts, a Russian capture of Chasiv Yar would likely allow further advances towards the cities of Kramatorsk and Sloviansk, the two largest settlements in Donetsk Oblast not under Russian occupation. However, as of August 2026, these cities remain under Ukrainian control, although subject to Russian shelling.

== Background ==
The hilltop city of Chasiv Yar has served as a front-line stronghold on the eastern front since 20 May 2023, when the Russian Armed Forces captured the neighboring city of Bakhmut, located 10 km (6 miles) to the east. Ukrainian forces stabilized the front-line east of Chasiv Yar shortly after, using the city to direct fire against Russian forces and as a staging point to push the Russians back along the flanks of Bakhmut during the 2023 counteroffensive.

The Siverskyi Donets – Donbas Canal runs through eastern Chasiv Yar. The canal separates most of Chasiv Yar from the "Kanal" microdistrict – the only neighborhood located east of the canal.

== Prelude ==
In December 2023, analyst and co-founder of DeepStateMap.Live, Roman Pohorilyi, remarked that "essentially it can be said that the defense of Chasiv Yar has already begun and every day they are getting closer and closer". Russian sources considered the offensives around Bakhmut as a push westwards towards Chasiv Yar, according to the Institute for the Study of War (ISW), an American think tank and war observer.

Following the conclusion of the battle of Avdiivka in February 2024, Russian forces restarted assault efforts from western Bakhmut towards Chasiv Yar. Chasiv Yar was seen as the next target of Russian forces after taking Avdiivka. On 8 February, the ISW noted that Russian and Ukrainian officials reported that positional engagements were occurring in the direction of Chasiv Yar. On 17 February, Russian forces dropped an ODAB-1500 thermobaric bomb on defending positions in Chasiv Yar.

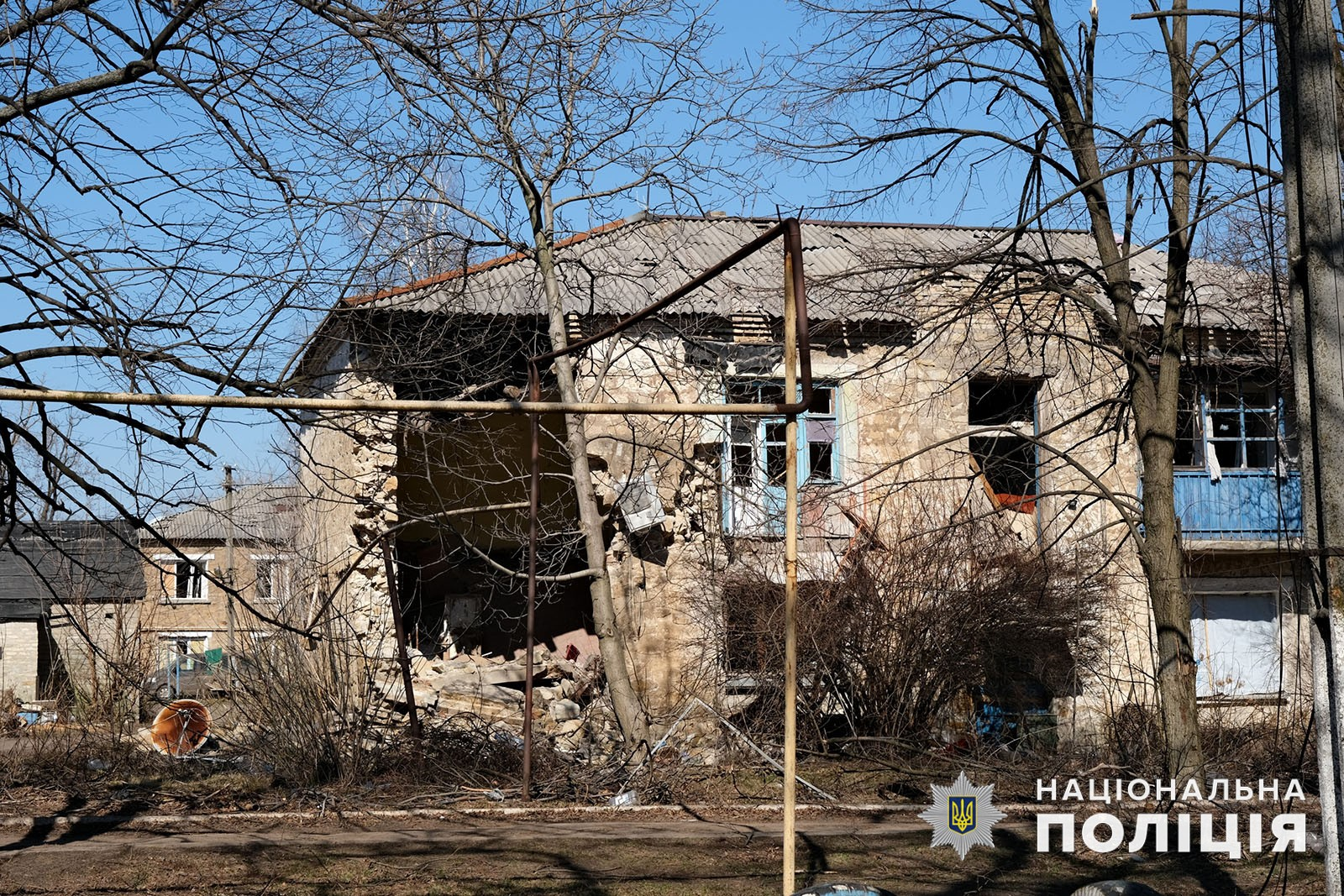
Damaged building in Chasiv Yar, 30 March 2024

Illia Yevlash, the spokesman for the Khortytsia operational-strategic group, announced on 27 February that Russia was targeting villages to the east of Chasiv Yar, such as Bohdanivka. Yevlash also claimed that Russian commanders were using human wave tactics involving Storm-Z and Storm-V penal units that had lost ~60% of their armored support due to Ukrainian artillery. On 1 March, Yevlash claimed that the Russian military had accumulated a large force near Chasiv Yar, had launched a "powerful thrust" toward the city, and was attempting to break through weak spots in the city's defenses.

On 23 March, the Russian Army claimed to have captured the village of Ivanivske, located southeast of Chasiv Yar. Ukrainian blogger and soldier Vitaly Ovcharenko reported on 26 March that Russian forces were shelling the city daily and constantly conducting assaults.

According to Sergiy Chaus, the head of the Chasiv Yar military administration (effectively the mayor of the city), 770 residents remained in the city as of early April 2024, compared to the pre-war population of 12,000 people.

In early April 2024, Ukraine's 5th Assault Brigade was stationed near Chasiv Yar.

== Battle ==
=== Early fighting and capture of Bohdanivka (4 – 21 April 2024) ===
After months of grinding down the Ukrainian fortified positions between Bakhmut and Chasiv Yar, the Russian Armed Forces launched their first direct armed assault on Chasiv Yar on 4 April. Supported by Su-25 close air support, a company-sized mechanized column advanced westwards along the T0506 (Khromove-Chasiv Yar) road and reached the eastern outskirts of the city, where Ukraine's 23rd Infantry Battalion was reportedly garrisoned. The next day, Russian reports suggested that Russian forces entrenched themselves along Zelena Street, the outermost street of the "Kanal" micro-district, which is Chasiv Yar's easternmost district, located east of the Siverskyi Donets – Donbas Canal. The Ukrainian military acknowledged the situation on the outskirts of Chasiv Yar had now become tense and difficult amid Russian encroachment, but denied Russian presence inside Chasiv Yar.

On 6 April, Commander-in-Chief Colonel-General Oleksandr Syrskyi stated "Chasiv Yar remains under our control as all the enemy's attempts to advance toward the settlement have failed." Mayor Sergiy Chaus confirmed the situation in the city was now dangerous, saying that there was "constant fire" heard in the city and that "there is not a single intact building left." The city's last known "stabilisation point"–a medical post that treats wounded soldiers evacuated from the front line–was itself recently evacuated for safety reasons, resulting in wounded Ukrainian soldiers having to be evacuated from the city by truck or on foot, according to a medic. Soldiers of Ukraine's 5th Assault Brigade confirmed they were increasing their FPV drone attacks, including with Mavics. The Chasiv Yar garrison reportedly suffered from shortages in artillery and anti-air ammunition at this time. Meanwhile, the Centre for Defence Strategies, a Ukrainian think tank, noted that "Urban combat operations may soon begin in Chasiv Yar".

On 9 April, the Khortytsia operational-strategic group reiterated that Russian forces had yet to enter Chasiv Yar, but stated "both today and yesterday, the enemy used their air superiority in missiles and large-calibre artillery ammunition" to bombard the city's infrastructure in support of Russian infantry and IFV assaults. The Russians were attempting to transfer infantry and large amounts of artillery pieces "as close to the contact line as possible so that they can launch assaults, but Ukrainian defenders are doing everything they possibly can to repel these attacks," including utilizing "large-scale counter-battery fire," according to Khortytsia.

On 10 April, the Ukrainians repelled a Russian "reinforced mechanised company" leaving their forward base in Ivanivske and driving west towards the forestry south of Chasiv Yar and southeast of the Kanal micro-district. Reportedly, Ukrainian artillery gunners, anti-tank missile crews, or drone operators utilized a small damaged bridge on the T-0504 road west of Ivanivske as a chokepoint to entrap advancing Russian armor, striking at least one Russian BMP as it crossed the bridge and forcing the rest of the assault vehicles to retreat. Ukrainian soldiers initially claimed 11 of 25 Russian vehicles were destroyed, but a military observer subsequently said 19 out of 34 vehicles were destroyed.

On 11 April, the Institute for the Study of War (ISW), an American think tank and war observer, assessed that positional battles continued on the eastern outskirts of Chasiv Yar and cited Russian sources as saying that elements of Russia's 98th Guards Airborne Division were participating in the assaults near the Kanal micro-district and Bohdanivka.

On 13 April, DeepStateMap.Live reported that Russian forces captured the town of Bohdanivka, located 3 kilometers northeast of Chasiv Yar.

On 14 April, Colonel-General Syrskyi stated that Chasiv Yar's garrison brigades had been reinforced with "ammunition, drones and electronic warfare equipment." Syrskyi, and later President Volodymyr Zelenskyy, also claimed that Russian military leadership had tasked their troops with capturing Chasiv Yar by 9 May.

On 16 April, Ukraine's National Guard stated that the Russians were transferring troops, reserves and resources from the relatively stagnant Kupiansk-Lyman front to reinforce the Chasiv Yar axis, indicating "the strategic significance of Chasiv Yar for the enemy. They will attempt to secure a victory here by any means necessary."

On 17–18 April, the ISW reported Russian advances amid ongoing clashes southeast of Chasiv Yar near Ivanivske and northeast of Chasiv Yar on the Bohdanivka axis, with Russian sources claiming advances on the approach to Kalynivka, located west of Bohdanivka and northeast of Chasiv Yar. Ukrainian forces commented on the Russian operations, with the Khortytsia operational-strategic group reporting that Russian troops were using ATVs to quickly transport and deploy infantry to the front line, while a Ukrainian battalion commander defending Chasiv Yar alleged that the Russians lost "between 40 and 70 percent of their equipment during assaults" and said 50 Ukrainian FPV drones were striking between 20 and 25 Russian targets "each day." A Ukrainian army spokesman stated that the Russians were attempting to avoid drone detection by limiting the size of their assault groups to no more than company size. Russian warplanes, including Su-25s and Su-34s, continued to launch heavy glide bomb strikes against Ukrainian ammunition depots and fighting positions in and around the city amid reported shortages in Ukrainian air defense munitions.

On 19 April, Ukrainian military observer Kostyantyn Mashovets reported the Russians were assaulting Chasiv Yar from three directions: from the Bohdanivka-Kalynivka axis towards the Kanal micro-district, along the T0504 (Bakhmut-Chasiv Yar) highway, and from the Ivanivske-Klishchiivka axis towards the Siverskyi Donets – Donbas Canal.

On 21 April, the Russian Ministry of Defence officially announced the capture of Bohdanivka as Russian forces continued to advance west towards Chasiv Yar.

=== Continued Russian encroachment and capture of Ivanivske (22 April – 21 June 2024) ===
On 22 April, Ukraine's Khortytsia operational-strategic group stated that 20,000 to 25,000 Russian troops were assaulting Chasiv Yar and its outskirt settlements and acknowledged the situation remained difficult "but controllable". Russian forces were "constantly storming" Chasiv Yar and attempting to gain a foothold in the city but were being repeatedly repelled by reinforced Ukrainian defenders, according to the group's spokesperson. On 23 April, a Ukrainian military spokesman stated that "In just the past day, 100 mortar and artillery bombardments were recorded on this direction, which is twice as many compared to the previous day." In early May, a Ukrainian milblogger estimated that as many as 15 Russian motorized rifle brigades were operating on the Chasiv Yar axis alone.

On 2 May, Major General Vadym Skibitskyi, the Deputy Chief of Ukraine's Main Directorate of Intelligence (HUR), stated that it was "probably a matter of time" that Russian forces would capture Chasiv Yar, but that the capture was not imminent and was dependent on Ukrainian reserves and supplies. On 3 May, Ukrainian Ground Forces Commander Lieutenant General Oleksandr Pavliuk stated that Russian forces had an estimated 10-to-1 artillery advantage over Ukrainian forces and was enjoying "total air superiority" over Chasiv Yar. Meanwhile, Russian milbloggers reported Russian troops were improving tactical positions on the city's outskirts via small infantry-led assaults, while dismissing Ukrainian claims that Russian forces were ordered to capture the city by 9 May. Clashes continued on the Bohdanivka axis, near the Novyi micro-district in eastern Chasiv Yar, east of Chasiv Yar near Ivanivske, and southeast of Chasiv Yar near Klishchiivka and Andriivka, according to the ISW.

On 7 May, a spokesperson for the Khortytsia operational-strategic group, Lieutenant Colonel Nazar Voloshyn, denied that Ukrainian forces had destroyed a bridge over the Siverskyi Donets – Donbas Canal. He later said that Ukrainian forces were actually repairing the bridge when it was hit by Russian FPV drones.

On 12 May, Russian milbloggers claimed that Russian forces had advanced north of the Kanal micro-district and up to three kilometers wide and up to 750 meters deep in the forestry south of Chasiv Yar and west of Ivanivske. Some milbloggers claimed the Stupky-Holubovskyi-2 nature reserve southeast of Chasiv Yar was fully captured, although the ISW had not observed visual evidence of these claims.

By 13 May, 680 civilians remained in Chasiv Yar, with others having fled westwards towards other villages such as Chervone and Mykolaivka. The mostly elderly civilians remaining in Chasiv Yar continued to hide from bombardment and rarely ventured outdoors. A volunteer named Sarhis Arutiunian—who previously delivered generators, stoves and other basic supplies to civilians alongside vehicles to military personnel—quoted some of the civilians as saying "I'm going to die soon anyway, so what's the point in moving?".

On 15 May a Ukrainian soldier, call sign "Zaur", reported to Sky News that fresh ammunition deliveries had begun reaching the garrison in Chasiv Yar two weeks prior. Zaur, who commanded an artillery unit operating a 2S1 Gvozdika, said the situation remained "pretty tense" and that there were "battles everyday" as the Russians gradually advanced.

On 17–18 May, Russia's 98th VDV launched another company-sized mechanised assault against Chasiv Yar, comparable to the 4 April advance. Reportedly, three HUR MO units – the Kraken Regiment, Special Purpose Unit "Artan" and the International Legion of Defense Intelligence of Ukraine – successfully repelled the assault, which reportedly involved two tanks and 21 IFVs. On 18 May, President Volodymyr Zelenskyy mentioned the assault in a statement, saying at least 20 vehicles were destroyed. The ISW assessed that the assault was indicative of intensified Russian efforts to capture Chasiv Yar, likely to capitalize on increased theater-wide pressure on Ukrainian defenders from other axes of advance in the Donbas and the recently launched Kharkiv offensive. "Ukrainian forces have recently transferred elements of a Ukrainian brigade defending in the Chasiv Yar area to the Vovchansk area, and Russian forces have likely intensified offensive operations near Chasiv Yar to quickly take advantage of weakened Ukrainian defences," the ISW observed.

On 21–22 May, geolocated footage published online indicated that Ukrainian troops had recaptured several buildings in the eastern portion of the Kanal micro-district. In contrast, Russian sources claimed elements of the 98th VDV had advanced 500 meters within the Kanal micro-district and were fighting on the eastern edges of the Novyi micro-district. A Russian milblogger claimed elements of the 98th and 11th VDV controlled a section of the Stupky-Holubovski 2 nature reserve up to the eastern side of the Siverskyi Donets – Donbas Canal, and that elements of the 200th Motorized Rifle Brigade were assaulting near Kalynivka. Ukraine's Khortytsia group stated that Russia planned to withdraw elements of the 98th VDV from the front line for replenishment.

On 23 May, Colonel General Oleksandr Syrskyi reiterated that the Russians wanted to capture Chasiv Yar "at any cost" amid regular assaults, at least some of which involved T-90 tanks and IFVs. These assaults were being repelled by anti-tank systems and FPV drone attacks, according to Syrskyi. Russian sources claimed Russian forces advanced up to 800 meters deep and 1.55 kilometers wide in the northern part of the Stupky-Holubovski 2 nature reserve, though the ISW could not verify these claims. Around this time, elements of Russia's 98th VDV were operating near Novyi micro-district, while elements of the 58th Spetsnaz Battalion (part of the 1st Donetsk People's Republic Army Corps) and volunteer Sever-V Brigade were reportedly also operating on the Chasiv Yar front, as cited by the ISW.

On 24 May, Kyrylo Sazonov, a soldier of Ukraine's 41st Mechanized Brigade, commented on the largely positional fighting on the Chasiv Yar front in an interview by Kyiv Independent. Sazonov denied that Russian troops had entered Chasiv Yar despite regular attacks, and insisted that Russian advances were tactical, saying "These advances of 50 metres forward, 50 metres back mean nothing. We also enter their territory, and they enter ours," emphasizing that the positional nature of the battle meant the Russians can be forced off of captured positions as soon as they capture them and vice versa.

On 26–28 May, Russian troops advanced several hundred meters wide in the Kanal micro-district, advancing further along Zelena Street and capturing a dormitory and several multi-story buildings, according to Russian sources. A Russian milblogger claimed Russian forces also captured the eastern half of Kalynivka. Another Russian milblogger claimed there was a shortage of electronic warfare systems among Russian forces in the Chasiv Yar area. The reports of Russian advances were not independently verified at the time and the ISW did not confirm any advances. Meanwhile, footage emerged on 27 May showing Ukrainian forces repelling a platoon-sized mechanised assault on the Chasiv Yar front.

On 31 May, DeepState mapping reported minor Russian advances in the forestry north of the Kanal micro-district.

Around 2 June, Junior Lieutenant Oleksandr Petrakovskyi, a former Ukrainian journalist that had become the commander of a mechanised company of the military unit A42, was declared missing in action during a combat mission in Chasiv Yar on 30 May. Reportedly, Petrakovskyi led a group of soldiers in quickly capturing a Russian dugout, but the Russians attacked the dug-out with explosives during a successful counterattack. "A mine hit the dugout. No one came out after that. They searched for the wounded with a helicopter. Our guys went in twice to collect the bodies, but to no avail. The position is now under the enemy's control," according to reports from colleagues and fellow soldiers.

On 4 June, the Kyiv Independent reported that Russian forces are advancing in an attempt to cut off the T0504 Highway south of Chasiv Yar which is a key supply route for Ukraine.

In the first week of June, Russian forces used a variety of weapons to conduct 8,350 strikes against Ukrainian positions on the Chasiv Yar; 2,300 attacks were carried out directly against positions inside Chasiv Yar. By 6 June, the Ukrainians recorded 1,100 artillery and mortar attacks on the Chasiv Yar front and 302 on the city itself, mostly in the southern portion of the city. On the morning of 6 June, the Russians conducted six airstrikes on the city, reportedly deploying five guided aerial bombs. Khortytsia operational-strategic group spokesperson Lt. Col. Nazar Voloshyn claimed the Russians conducted three costly armored vehicle assaults, resulting in 92 injuries and 75 fatalities.

By 7 June, Ukrainian troops had recaptured Kalynivka during a counterattack, pushing Russian forces out of the village in an effort to protect Chasiv Yar's northern flank. On 7 June, Russian troops made more minor advances in eastern Chasiv Yar, according to the ISW.

On 8–9 June, geolocated footage indicated Russian troops, including the 98th VDV, had advanced into an industrial area of the Kanal micro-district, with some Russian sources claiming the entire industrial area was captured.

On 10 June, DeepStateMap.Live reported that Russian forces captured the village of Ivanivske on the eastern outskirts of Chasiv Yar. Lt. Col. Nazar Voloshyn denied the report, insisting Ukrainian forces remained in the village and controlled the sector.

=== Capture of the "Kanal" district and east Kalynivka (11 June – 24 July 2024) ===
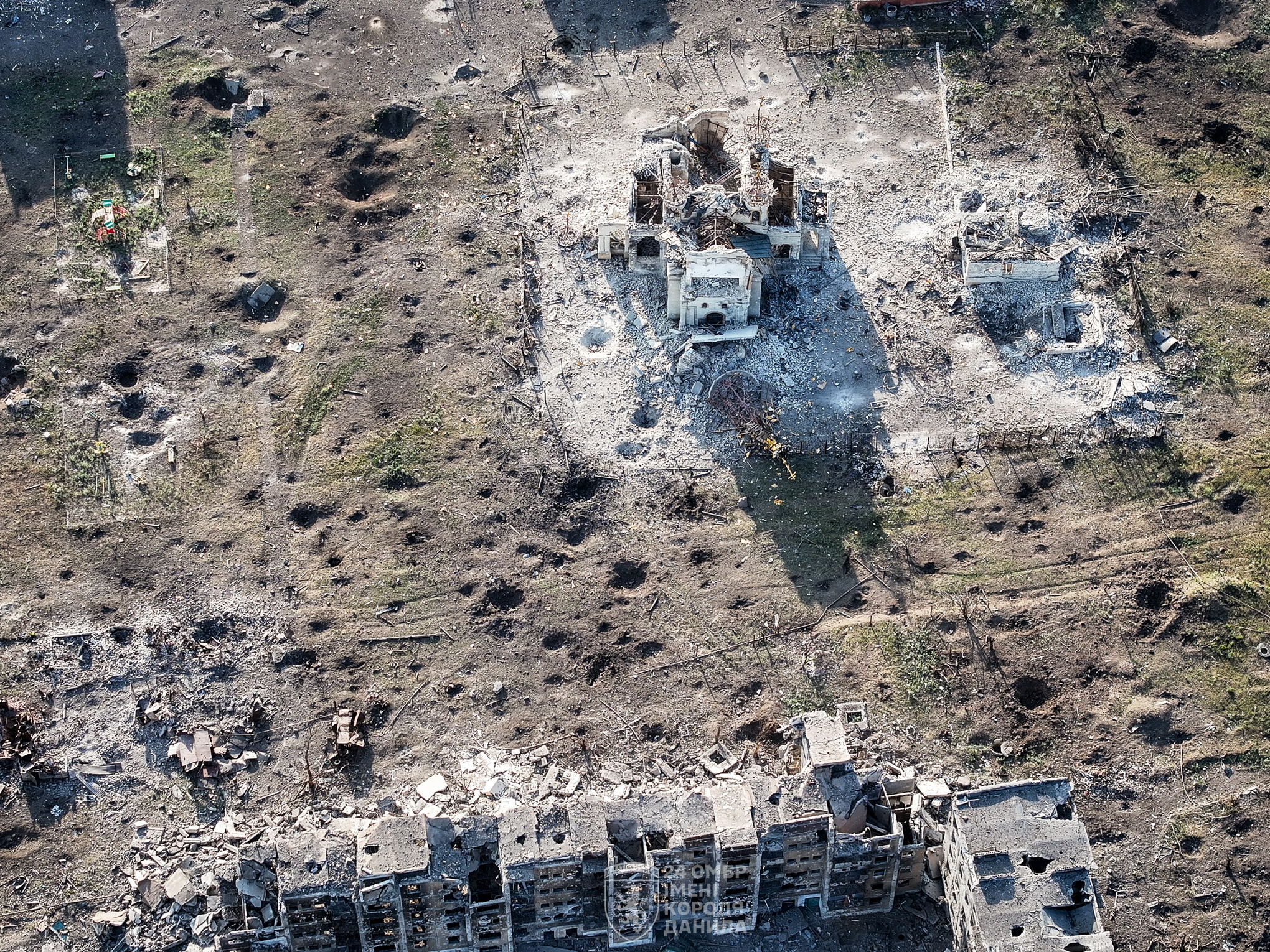
Battle damage in Chasiv Yar, July 2024

On 11 June, Ukrainian military observer Kostyantyn Mashovets reported that the 98th VDV recently advanced up to the intersection of Koshovoho and Zrazkova streets within the Kanal micro-district. Elements of Russia's 11th VDV and 150th Motor Rifle Division were also continuing assaults against the Novyi micro-district.

On 12 June, a British defence ministry intelligence report stated that there was a "high possibility" that Russian troops were "advancing through the suburbs using infantry, and that the level of losses among the Russian military is very high," while also noting reports of the Russians using thermobaric artillery on Chasiv Yar.

On 13 June, a Ukrainian unit commander in Chasiv Yar stated the Russians were trying to attack from the Klishchiivka–Andriivka axis in order to flank south and attack Chasiv Yar's southern rear. The commander also claimed that the Russians were no longer conducting infantry-led "meat assaults", but were operating in small groups of infantry supported by mechanized vehicles. He added that the Russians occasionally used military motorcycles during assaults and were increasing their usage of drones on the front-line. Geolocated footage reportedly suggested that Russian troops were still 700–800 metres east of the Siverskyi Donets – Donbas Canal.

On 14 June, the ISW cited an acting commander for a Ukrainian drone battalion as claiming the Russians were deploying chemical weapons on the Chasiv Yar front. The commander alleged that Russian troops were mixing unspecified chemicals with chloropicrin, a riot control agent similar to tear gas. The Chemical Weapons Convention, which Russia is signatory to, bans the use of chloropicrin in warfare.

On 20 June, Ukraine's 24th Mechanized Brigade announced it had redeployed units to Chasiv Yar to reinforce defences. Russian forces were "constantly organizing massive frontal assaults and trying to bypass the settlement from the north and south," according to the brigade, which described the battle as "extremely difficult." The next day, Khortytsia group spokesperson Lt. Col. Nazar Voloshyn said "small groups of up to five" Russian soldiers were attempting to infiltrate the Novyi and Kanal districts amid continued mechanized frontal assaults but said the situation remained "under control".

On 22–23 June, Nazar Voloshyn claimed that 50 Russians were killed and 80 wounded, down from 250 killed and 400 wounded the previous day. Average Russian losses, he claimed, were 60 to 80 a day. Voloshyn also claimed that "1,100 mortar and artillery attacks took place in this area in just one day. And in the area of Chasiv Yar... more than 260 attacks from various types of weapons were made." Russian sources claimed that Ukrainian troops had retreated west of the Siverskyi Donets – Donbas Canal as Russia's 98th VDV advanced north of the Kanal and Novyi districts, allegedly crossing the canal at some locations, though these advances were not visually confirmed. John Hardie of FDD's Long War Journal would later write that Russia's 98th VDV apparently had a new commander since at least 22 June, citing a post on a Telegram channel affiliated with the 98th. The post reportedly congratulated the recently reestablished 299th Guards Airborne Regiment on the 80th anniversary of its founding and was signed by Major General "R. Yevkodimov".

A spokesperson for a Ukrainian brigade in Chasiv Yar claimed on 26 June that the Russians were decreasing their usage of armored combat vehicles and tube artillery, instead attacking mainly with infantry and mortars.

On 27–29 June, the 24th Brigade reported intense clashes near the Siverskyi Donets – Donbas Canal as Russian forces continued "endless" frontal assaults concurrent with attacks on the city's flanks, using a variety of weapons including FPV drones and airstrikes. The 24th noted that Russian assault forces included paratroopers, special operations personnel, and former prisoners of the Storm-V penal unit. Nazar Voloshyn claimed Russian troops were forced out of their foothold in the Kanal district, however Russian forces reported continued advances and claimed to have destroyed a communications tower near the city. Meanwhile, Russia's 217th Guards Airborne Regiment was reportedly fighting in Chasiv Yar as of 28 June.

On 1–2 July 2024, Russian milbloggers reported minor advances northeast and south of Kalynivka as clashes continued near the Kanal and Novyi districts and near Klishchiivka.

By 2 July, Russian troops reportedly controlled the western half of Kalynivka, advancing up to Lisova Street, and geolocated footage confirmed new advances inside the Kanal district.

On 2 July, military observer Kostyantyn Mashovets reported that Ukrainian troops had "completely lost" the Kanal district and claimed that elements of Russia's 98th VDV–including the 217th, 299th, and 331st regiments–had captured the district, possibly with assistance from the 11th VDV and 102nd Motorized Rifle Regiment. Mashovets added that the Russians also held positions west of the Kanal district, near a destroyed bridge along Oleh Koshevoy Street. According to Euromaidan Press, Russian infantry advanced under the cover of friendly shelling and captured the district's industrial zone before coming under Ukrainian AGS grenade launcher fire from nearby tree lines. Control of the industrial zone allowed the Russians to flank Ukrainians holding out in the remaining multi-story buildings amid continuous glide bomb air strikes and artillery, eventually prompting a withdrawal west of the canal, the outlet continued.

On 3 July, the Russian defence ministry announced its forces had fully captured the Kanal district and also claimed control of the Novyi district (located west of the canal), forcing Ukrainian forces to retreat west of the canal. The capture of both districts was also reported by the DeepStateMap.Live war blog and the ISW, with DeepState remarking the Kanal district had been "completely erased" and abandoning it was "logical, albeit a difficult decision."

The Khortytsia group confirmed the loss of the Kanal district on 4 July, stating that conditions inside the ruined district had become "inexpedient" and months of artillery and airstrikes made supplying and maintaining positions there untenable, resulting in a "protected retreat" west of the canal. A spokesperson for the 24th Brigade called the fighting "critically difficult" and went on to describe Russian tactics, saying Russian infantry would move into the nearby forests and then disperse to "attack Ukrainian positions in small groups ... advancing soldiers were covered by shelling and attack drones." An unidentified soldier of the 24th Brigade told media that abandoning the ruined Kanal district was a net positive, as it shortened Ukrainian supply lines, improved logistics, and saved lives, insisting that Ukraine's new priority was to use the defensive terrain to "crush" any attempted Russian advances across the canal. Oleh Shyriaiev, the commander of Ukraine's 255th Assault Battalion, claimed the Russians razed every building in the district that had not already been destroyed by shelling. He accused the Russians of deploying scorched earth tactics offensively, destroying everything that could possibly be used as a defensive position, despite already having a 10-to-1 manpower advantage in the battle.

By 7 July, the ISW reported that Russian forces had advanced to capture all territory east of the canal in both Chasiv Yar and the surrounding area, including parts of Kalynivka. On 7 July, Ivan Petrychak, a spokesperson for the 24th Brigade, stated that firefights, counter-battery fires, and artillery duels continued unabated but the intensity of shelling had decreased after the fall of the Kanal district. Ukrainian evacuation and supply routes persisted west of the canal, allowing for transport of ammunition and wounded, according to Petrychak.

By 11 July, Russian forces were continuing to consolidate positions in the ruins of the Kanal district while launching attacks north of Chasiv Yar towards Kalynivka and Hryhorivka in efforts to consolidate the front-line east of the Siverskyi-Donets Donbas Canal. According to Ukrainian troops, the canal was acting as a barrier that was assisting their defensive operations. A Ukrainian colonel in Chasiv Yar claimed that Russian troops were still utilizing motorcycles alongside ATVs and golf carts for transport during assaults, probably out of necessity due to heavy losses in armored vehicles.

By mid-July, the Ukrainian garrison in and around Chasiv Yar was concerned about threats to their rear supply routes and southern flank, resulting in critical shortages in ammunition, anti-air missiles, and artillery. The Russians attacked Toretsk on 18 June (25 kilometers south of Chasiv Yar)–increasing pressure on Chasiv Yar's southern flank–and were nearly six kilometers away from the Highway T0504 supply road west of Chasiv Yar after local advances west of Ocheretyne, threatening the Pokrovsk direction with drone attacks and artillery. An 80th Air Assault Brigade artilleryman, call-sign "Bohdan", said his unit was receiving a "small fraction of shells daily compared to 2023 supplies" and was conserving shells, resulting in reduced fire support for their troops. "We try to show that we have something, but honestly, we have nothing (to defend Chasiv Yar with)," said Bohdan.

On 17 July, Russian forces broke through defenses southwest of Kalynivka and allegedly reached a pipe system that crosses the canal, according to pro-Russian sources. The next day, 18 July, Ukrainian military observer Kostyantyn Mashovets stated elements of Russia's 98th and 11th VDV, and 200th and 102nd Motorized Rifle Regiments captured eastern Kalynivka, up to the canal. Attempts to cross the canal remained unsuccessful, Mashovets added. DeepStateMap.Live corroborated reports of the capture of Kalynivka east of the canal.

The United Kingdom Ministry of Defense assessed on 20 July that Russia had increased reconnaissance operations near Chasiv Yar while taking a "tactical pause" on normal ground assaults.

Between 23 and 24 July, the Ukrainian General Staff reported continued general Russian attacks north of Chasiv Yar, near Vasyukivka, Minkivka, Orikhovo-Vasylivka, Hryhorivka, Kalynivka, and Bohdanivka.

Vadym Filashkin, the governor of Donetsk Oblast, stated that 530 civilians remained in Chasiv Yar by 24 July, assuring that all children had been evacuated. Filashkin added that the Russians were hindering evacuation efforts by shelling all roads into the city. By 1 August, all public utilities and transport were unavailable, with local residents lacking basic water supplies and dependent on volunteers for food delivery and humanitarian aid. "There is no water, no electricity, no gas, nothing. It's just a dead city," according to Filaskin. Some locals were resorting to burying their dead in back gardens due to a lack of transport to nearby cemeteries, according to a Radio Free Europe/Radio Liberty report. By 8 August there were "up to" 500 civilians remaining, and supplying humanitarian aid remained difficult, according to Filashkin.

=== Crossing the Siverskyi Donets – Donbas Canal (28 July – 16 October 2024) ===
On 28–30 July 2024, elements of the 98th VDV accumulated in the 'Orlovo' forest tract–located south of Kalynivka and northeast of the "Zhovetnevyi" micro-district–and successfully pushed Ukrainian troops out of their positions in the forest. Russian paratroopers hid in the forest during the day and at night broke through the Siverskyi Donets – Donbas Canal defense line, purportedly crossing the canal along a narrow route and consolidating positions on the western bank, on the eastern outskirts of the "Zhovetnevyi" micro-district and northern "Novyi" micro-district. Reportedly, the Ukrainians struggled to counterattack as Russian forces used "intense" electronic warfare to disrupt drone activity. Nevertheless, a Ukrainian FPV drone managed to strike a BMP-3 unloading eight soldiers before it reached the west bank of the canal amid a costly assault. A milblogger posted a map suggesting the Russians controlled most of 'Orlovo' forest but had not crossed the canal, only traversing along areas where the canal runs underground.

On 31 July-1 August, the ISW reported that Russian forces had "marginally advanced" and crossed the canal north of the Novyi district, citing geolocated battlefield footage. Russian troops utilized tunnels near the underground portion of the canal to infiltrate behind Ukrainian positions on the west bank and consolidate positions, according to Russian sources. Ukrainian Commander-in-Chief, Colonel General Oleksandr Syrskyi, confirmed there was heavy fighting ongoing near the canal. DeepStateMap.Live corroborated reports of Russian forces operating west of the canal, entering Zhovetnevyi district. Ukrainian troops used grenade launchers and mortars positioned atop a refractory plant and an elevated coal mine located further north to disrupt Russian attempts to expand their bridgehead, inflicting heavy casualties and equipment losses, according to Euromaidan Press.

Ruins of the city in August 2024

From 2–4 August, Russian paratroopers were clearing and consolidating new positions in Zhovetnevyi district, according to Russian sources. On 5 August, Russian forces made a minor advance south of Hryhorivka. A spokesman for Ukraine's 24th Mechanized Brigade acknowledged that Russian troops were still utilizing small unit tactics on the front line, but denied that they had established positions west of the canal. In contrast, the ISW reported that Russian troops had again "marginally advanced" in Zhovetnevyi district and advanced along Lisova Street within Kalynivka by 9 August.

Minor clashes continued on the Chasiv Yar front (Hryhorivka, Kalynivka and further southeast near Klishchiivka) between 10 and 16 August, with the ISW not observing any major front line changes. Ukrainian troops reportedly counterattacked on 16–17 August, making a marginal advance in the Zhovtnevyi district, but ISW saw no visual evidence of this.

On 29 August, Andriy Polukhin, a spokesperson for the 24th Mechanized Brigade, mistakenly stated during a television interview that Russian forces controlled "40%" of Chasiv Yar, later retracting the claim. DeepState estimated that Russia controlled 8% of the city at the time.

On 31 August, at least five men "aged 24 to 38" were killed during Russian shelling on the city; shells landed on a high-rise building and a private household, according to Donetsk governor Vadym Filashkin.

On 2 September, Oleh Kalashnikov, a spokesperson for Ukraine's 26th Artillery Brigade, denied that Russia had established total fire control over the city and also denied that Russian troops had established a bridgehead. Footage published the same day showed further Russian advances west of the Siverskyi Donets – Donbas Canal in Chasiv Yar and in Kalynivka.

On 5 September, Russian forces were confirmed to have advanced west of Klishchiivka, reaching the Siverskyi Donets – Donbas Canal. Additional advances were reportedly made the same day through western Kalynivka. On 10 September, Russia announced the capture of Hryhorivka north of Kalynivka, though this was not visually confirmed. Geolocated footage on 18 September confirmed new Russian advances near Hryhorivka.

On 16–17 September, elements of the "Shustry" detachment of Chechen Akhmat Spetsnaz and Russia's 4th Motorized Rifle Brigade successfully advanced in the direction of the village of Stupochky, south of Chasiv Yar, crossing the canal in the process. On 19–21 September, Russian forces made marginal advances along the Ivanivske-Klishchiivka-Andriivka axis in support of the nearby Stupochky bridgehead west of the canal.

On 26 September, one civilian, a 48-year-old man, was killed and three others were injured during Russian shelling in Chasiv Yar. Another civilian, a 63-year-old man, was killed from Russian shelling on 4 October.

Clashes continued into early October with no notable territorial advances along Chasiv Yar's northeastern and southeastern flanks. Heavy fighting reportedly continued in the Zhovetnevyi district as Russian troops were attempting to cut a Ukrainian ground line of communication. Anastasia Bobovnikova, a spokesperson for Ukraine's Operational Tactical Group Luhansk, stated on 11 October that Russian forces were transferring reinforcements to the battle. The ISW reported that drone operators of the "Burevestnik" volunteer detachment from the Russian Volunteer Corps were operating near Chasiv Yar, while the deputy commander of a Ukrainian battalion operating in the region stated that Russian glide bomb airstrikes were mostly targeting rear areas rather than frontline positions.

On 13 October, a Ukrainian brigade spokesperson claimed Russian forces were still conducting small unit tactics, mainly conducting small infantry ground assaults rather than mechanized assaults, especially near the Stupochky bridgehead south of Chasiv Yar. By 15 October, Russian forces west of Ivanivske had advanced up to 900 meters deep across the canal along the T0504 Bakhmut-Kostyantynivka highway north of the Stupochky bridgehead, according to Russian milbloggers. Meanwhile, the Security Service of Ukraine (SBU) announced on 15 October the arrest of a 22-year-old Ukrainian drone operator on suspicion of treason for allegedly providing Russian forces with the coordinates of his own drone unit fighting in Chasiv Yar.

By 16 October, Russian forces had penetrated defenses along Chasiv Yar's southern flank, establishing at least two bridgeheads west of the canal, one along the T0504 highway and another among forestry further south in the Stupochky-Predtechyne direction, west of the Klishchiivka-Andriivka line.

=== Advance into the south and fight for central Chasiv Yar (17 October 2024 – present) ===
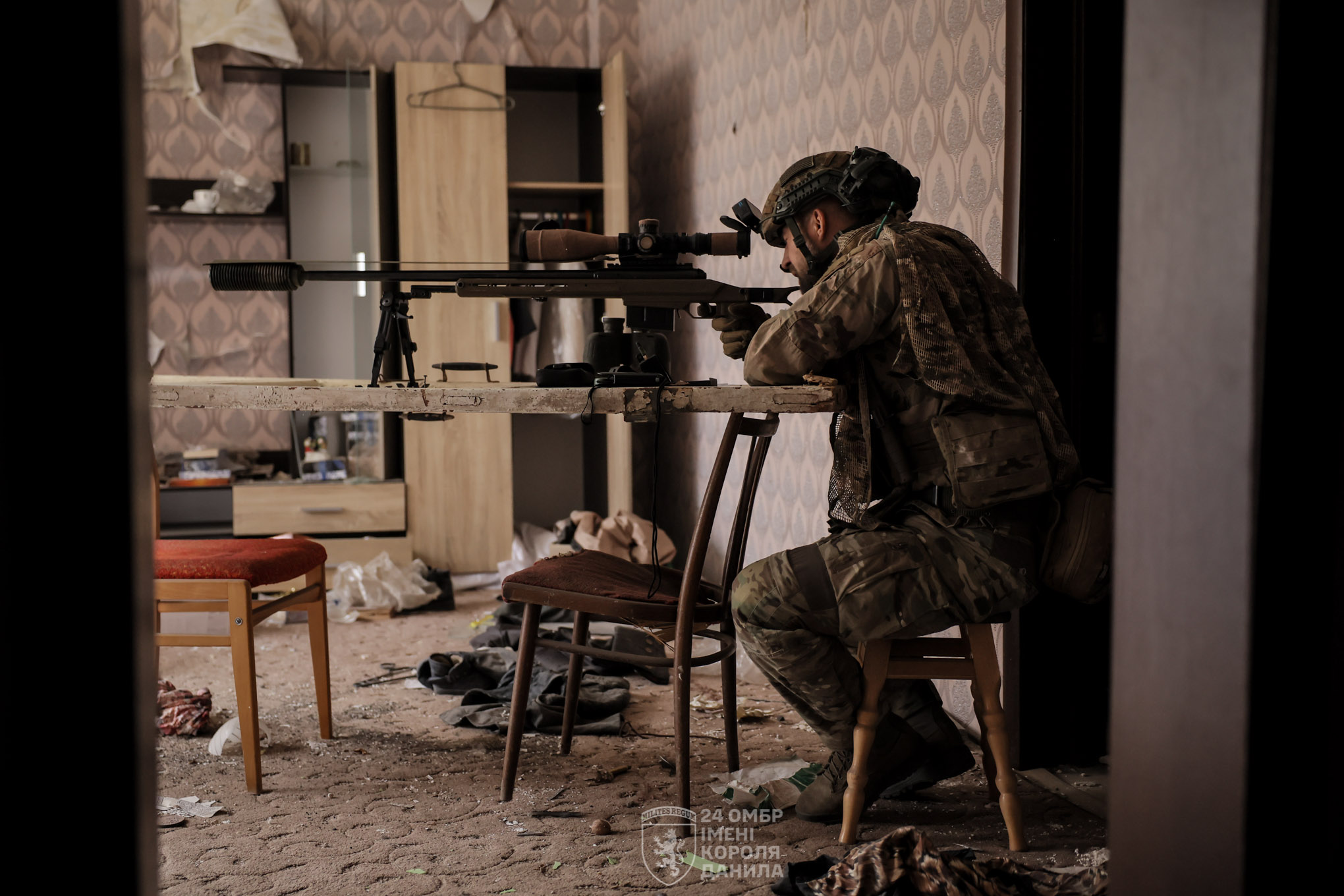
24th Mechanized Brigade sniper in Chasiv Yar, October 2024

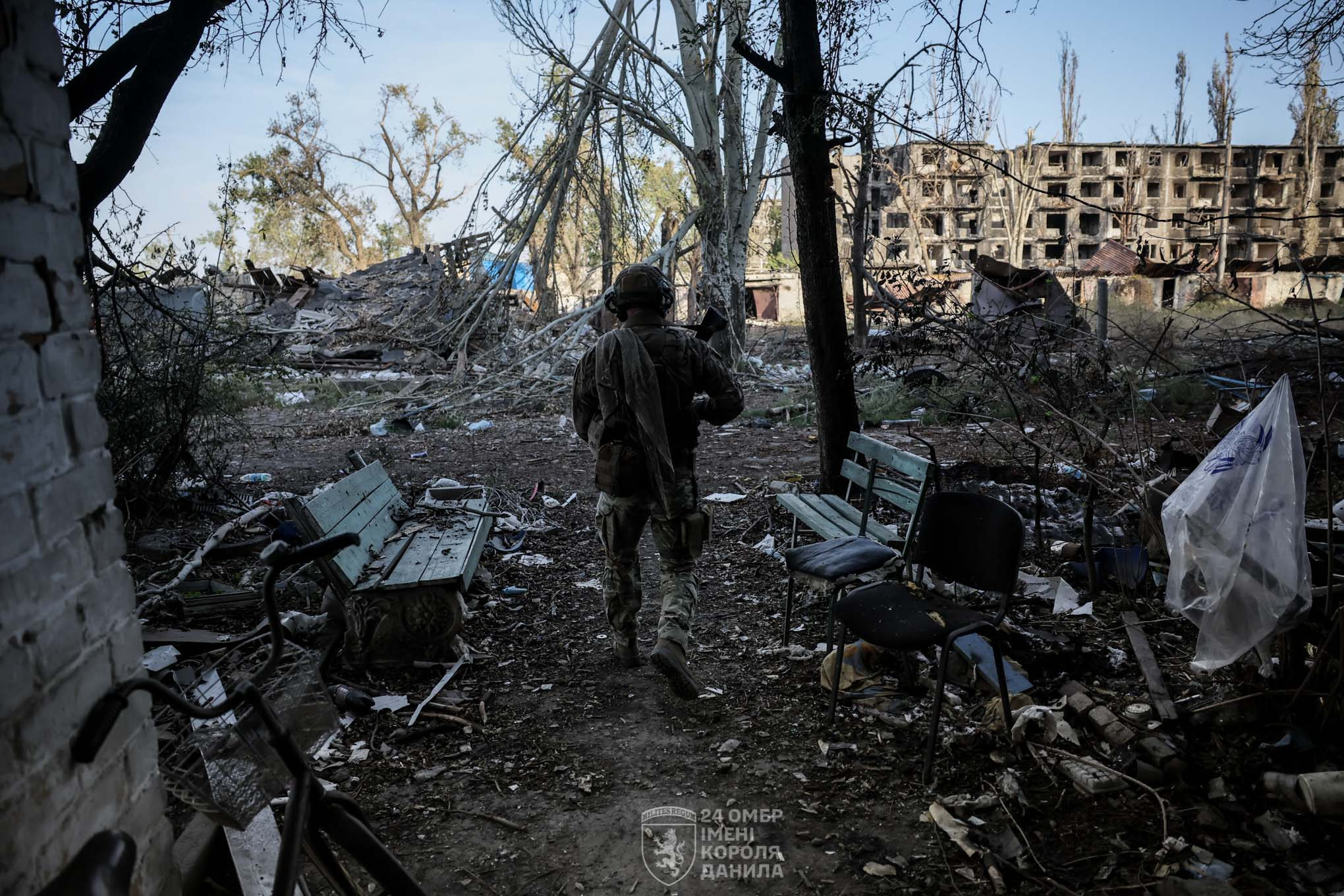
Destruction in Chasiv Yar, October 2024

On 17 October, footage confirmed that Russian forces had advanced in two directions: further west of the canal in eastern Chasiv Yar, and into the southeastern administrative boundaries of the city, entering the "Block-9" mine. A Ukrainian brigade representative reported on 22 October that the city's defensive line had been breached. Russian milbloggers also claimed that advances had been made, in the eastern and northeastern parts of the city, though another from the same Ukrainian brigade denied that a Russian breakthrough had occurred.

Russian forces made further advances east of Stupochky in early November, including into a mine east of the village, while small counterattacks were executed by Ukraine. By 15 November, Russian forces had reached central Chasiv Yar. Around the same time, Russian troops began advancing up to the Siverskyi Donets – Donbas canal south of Chasiv Yar; in mid-November, a pocket around Andriivka was closed, followed by an advance near Ozarianivka around 19 November. Russian forces reportedly penetrated Ukrainian defensive lines around Klishchiivka, and were confirmed to have advanced west of Klishchiivka, crossing the Siverskyi Donets – Donbas canal. Another advance near the canal was made around 22 November, northeast of Bila Hora.

According to Mayor Sergiy Chaus, by mid-November, 304 civilians still remained in Chasiv Yar amid increasingly difficult evacuation efforts.

In early December, footage was published indicating that Ukrainian forces had successfully counterattacked southeast of Chasiv Yar, advancing along the highway south of the city. Fighting continued around the Chasiv Yar refractory plant and elsewhere in and near the city. Footage from late November confirmed that Russian forces had entered the plant and advanced to the south of the area.

Further advances were claimed on 9 December in the northern and central parts of Chasiv Yar, through Haharina and Parkova streets. Ukrainian drone usage in the Chasiv Yar area was reportedly hampered by the precipitation and extreme temperatures that came with the winter season, while Russian drones were reported to be frequently mining Ukrainian communication lines.

The status of the refractory plant in Chasiv Yar was disputed among Russian milbloggers, with some saying Ukrainian forces retained a foothold in the western part of the plant, and another saying on 11 December that it had been fully captured. Later in mid-December, Ukrainian forces recaptured territory in the refractory plant, and by the end of December had been confirmed to have further advanced in central Chasiv Yar. Meanwhile, Russian forces advanced in northern Chasiv Yar; Russian sources claimed advances in the area in late December, including a capture of the railway station in that sector of the city, and footage published at an earlier date confirmed a Russian advance up to Lermontova street.

In early January 2025, Ukrainian forces regained some ground southeast of Chasiv Yar along the Siverskyi Donets – Donbas canal. In mid-January, Ukrainska Pravda confirmed the Russian capture of the refractory plant, as the Ukrainian forces conducted an airstrike on the compound. The plant served as a reliable fortification in the city's north.

The Moscow Times reported on 29 January, citing five European and Ukrainian military sources, that Chasiv Yar had come under Russian control, with Ukrainian forces being pushed to the outskirts of the city. According to commander, military expert and historian Markus Reisner, as of early February, 90% of Chasiv Yar was occupied by Russian forces.

On 31 July 2025, Russia's Ministry of Defense reported that its forces had captured Chasiv Yar, publishing drone footage showing its troops in areas of the town and asserting that more than 4,200 buildings and structures had been cleared with about 50 Ukrainian soldiers captured. The Ukrainian military denied the claim and stated that the town remained under its control. Ukrainian open-source mapping site DeepState showed Ukrainian forces still present at the western edge of the town. On 6 August, Aljazeera reported the capture of the city by Russian forces.

== Casualties ==
In June 2024, Lieutenant Colonel Nazar Voloshyn, a spokesperson for Ukraine's Khortytsia operational-strategic group, claimed Russian losses of 5,095 soldiers killed and wounded, plus 24 taken prisoner, over the past month.

On 7 July, in a statement made during the United News telethon, Voloshyn claimed that "for the entire period of active hostile operations to destroy the Kanal neighborhood, around 5,000 Russian personnel were killed and buried in the forest strips". Forbes analyst David Axe gave an even higher estimate, claiming that for "every town—or even neighborhood—the Russians capture, they bury tens of thousands of their own troops".

Similarly, Ukrainian Lieutenant General Ivan Havrylyuk claimed on 9 July that Russian forces suffered 5,000 casualties (killed or wounded) during attritional clashes to capture a single neighborhood in Chasiv Yar. The Institute for the Study of War (ISW) observed he was also likely referring to the Kanal micro-district (three blocks wide and three blocks long) which was captured on 2–3 July. Historian Nikolay Mitrokhin assessed the number of losses by the Russian side for capturing the Kanal district as around 3,000 killed.

On 17 November 2024, former RT producer Magomed Buchaev, volunteering in the Russian forces, was reportedly killed during an assault in Chasiv Yar.

On 3 January 2025, the Ukrainian 24th Mechanized Brigade claimed that one of its battalions destroyed four T-62 tanks and three BMP-2 IFVs in the city.

The DeepState analytical project estimated that Russian forces had suffered 4,880 casualties in Chasiv Yar between April 2024 and February 2025, including 1,967 killed, 2,897 wounded and 16 captured.

== Analysis ==
=== Strategic value and battlefield conditions ===
Chasiv Yar is regarded as a strategic city for Russian forces to capture in the Donbas. In contrast to neighboring Bakhmut, Chasiv Yar is located on defensible elevated ground, making it a strong fortified settlement for the defending Ukrainian forces. If captured, its geographical position would allow Russian forces to exert fire control over nearby Ukrainian supply routes and allow ground forces to advance downhill towards Kostiantynivka and Druzhkivka and the major provincial cities of Kramatorsk and Sloviansk, which are part of the main defence line in Donetsk Oblast. In early April 2024, members of Ukraine's 5th Assault Brigade referred to Chasiv Yar as the "door" to the rest of Donetsk Oblast, and compared the destruction of the city to that suffered by others that had been assaulted by Russian forces. On the other hand, in a May 2024 interview, Ukrainian general Oleksandr Pavliuk, commander of the Ukrainian Ground Forces, argued that the loss of Chasiv Yar would have no "decisive significance", saying it was "just a regular urban settlement".

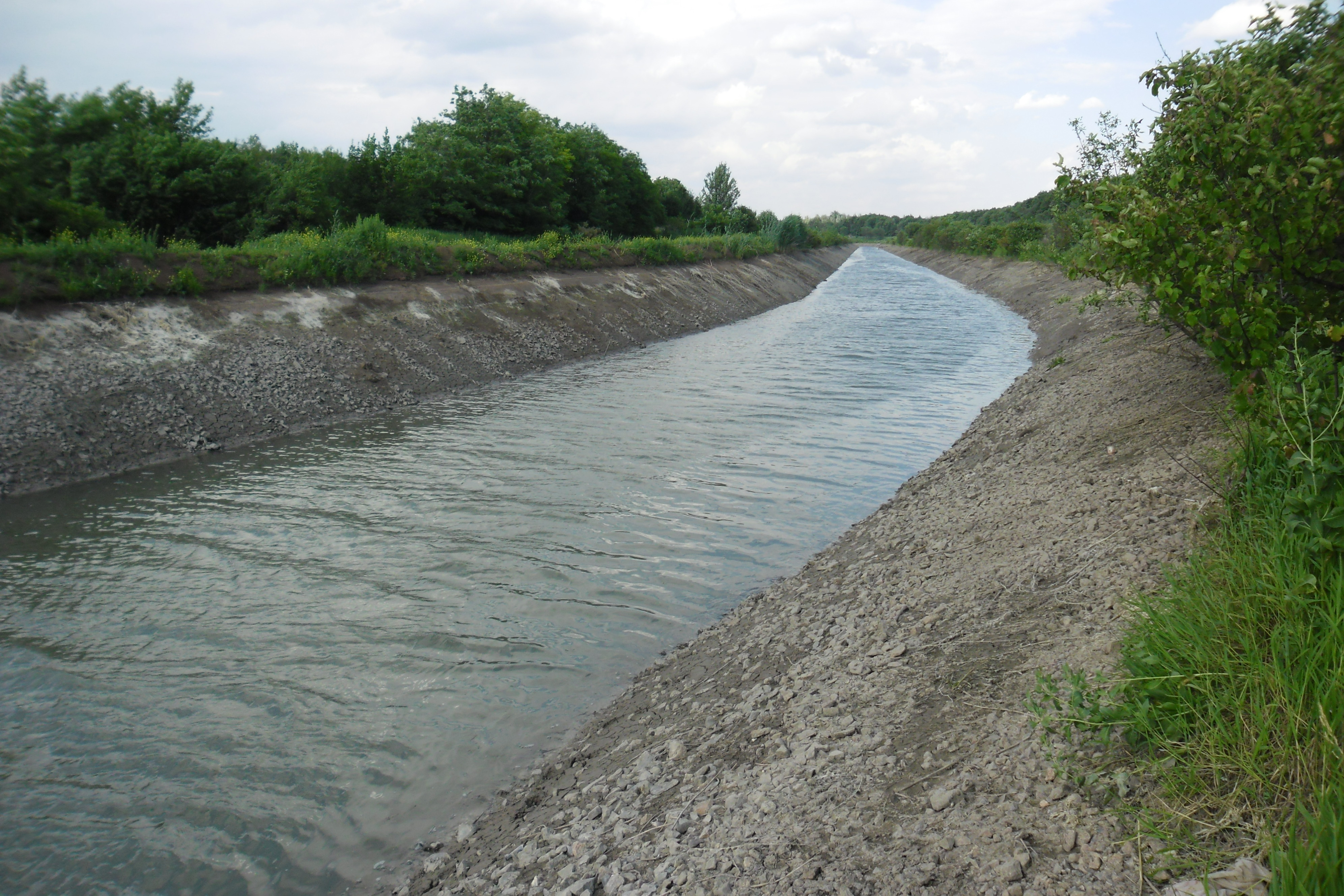
View of the Siverskyi Donets – Donbas Canal in 2015. The canal separates central Chasiv Yar from the "Kanal" micro-district, its easternmost neighborhood.

Frontelligence Insight, a Ukrainian analysis group, anticipated that Russian forces would struggle to cross the "several bridges over the water channel" connecting the road from Chasiv Yar to Bakhmut. The Aidar Battalion deputy commander, call-sign "Chichen", stated in early April that the 10-meter-wide man-made Siverskyi Donets – Donbas Canal was "one of the main boundaries that everyone is trying to hold on to" as Russian vehicles would have more difficulty crossing it than infantry. David Axe, an American military correspondent writing for Forbes, wrote on 20 June 2024 that Chasiv Yar's defensible terrain made all Russian ground assaults high-risk and costly. The forests around the Kanal micro-district offered some cover from Ukrainian drones, "but crossing the canal itself means leaving the forest and dashing across one of the two land bridges spanning the canal," resulting in the land bridges becoming kill zones, Axe wrote.

=== Tactics and weaponry ===
In early April 2024, some soldiers of Ukraine's 5th Assault Brigade said Russian forces on the Chasiv Yar front were operating more competently than in previous years, with one quoted as saying, "They're learning, they've learned, they're not stupid ... it's not the same army as in 2022." The commander of the "Kotyky" unit in Chasiv Yar, call-sign "Tor", said the Russians had improved their ISR capabilities, often attacking during Ukrainian troop rotations–when defensive lines and communication among units are at their weakest–and making large troop movements impossible to obfuscate. The Russians also complicated Ukrainian logistics by targeting supply routes with attack drones. The Ukrainians were forced to increasingly rely on drones for air-dropping supplies to front-line positions, and vehicle drivers–who were forced to use armored vehicles instead of regular trucks–deployed night vision while driving along supply routes at night.

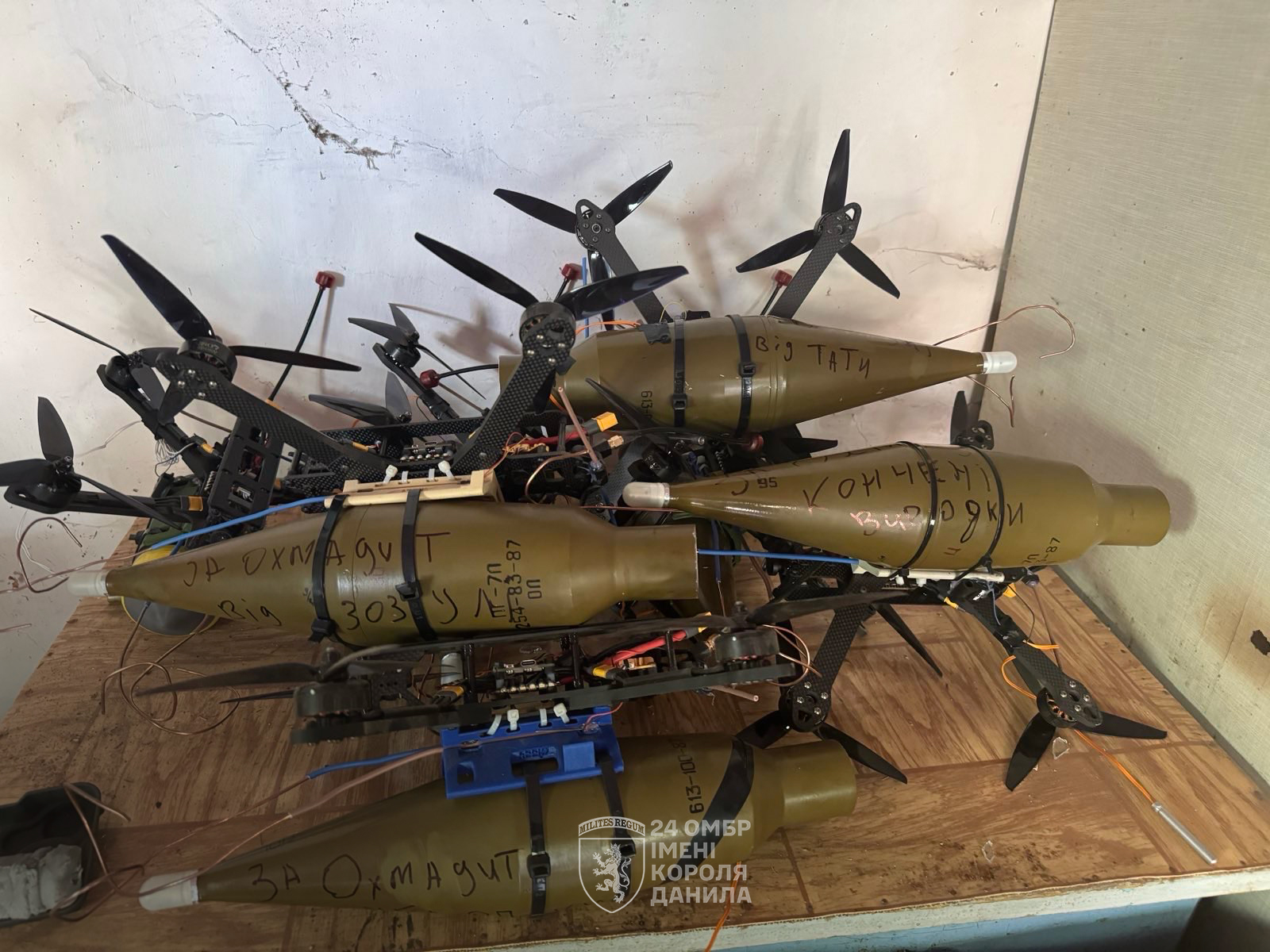
Ukrainian kamikaze drones in Chasiv Yar, July 2024

Compensating for shortages in manpower and ammunition, Ukrainian FPV drone teams—including elements from the 5th Assault Brigade, 92nd Assault Brigade, 24th Mechanised Brigade and 225th Assault Battalion—have played a vital role in defending Chasiv Yar. Hand-picked specialists were tasked with piloting and repairing UAVs and with conducting electronic warfare. Drone pilots operating from nearby basements conduct reconnaissance and attack Russian forces directly, or coordinate artillery strikes on infantry and armored vehicles. Ukraine's large 6-rotor "Vampire" drone—nicknamed the Baba Yaga by the Russians—has been utilized for ferrying supplies to friendly troops in trenches and front-line positions. 23rd Mechanised Brigade specialists deploy German-made Vector reconnaissance drones from front-line dugouts to conduct missions as far east as Bakhmut. The 23rd deploy the drones at night to minimize the threat of enemy FPV drones and artillery and because the Russians did not field many drones equipped with night vision. Both Russian and Ukrainian drone operators prioritized neutralizing enemy drone pilots during flight missions. The daily threat of FPV drone attacks result in soldiers having to be constantly on alert, and Russian drones often drop anti-personnel "butterfly" mines across the city, according to the 24th Brigade.

In mid-April 2024, drone and anti-tank teams reportedly destroyed or damaged most vehicles during a Russian mechanised assault against Chasiv Yar, with FPV drones attacking the armor directly or by dropping mines in the path of the vehicles. In mid-August 2024, the Come Back Alive foundation released footage of a Ukrainian FPV drone slamming into a Russian Orlan-10 reconnaissance drone to destroy it, purportedly near Chasiv Yar.

On 21 April 2024, the British defence ministry stated that Russia's "concerted aerial bombardment" of Chasiv Yar was comparable to that conducted during the battle of Avdiivka, in which close air support via glide bombs heavily assisted Russian ground units in capturing the fortified city. By late April Russian warplanes were dropping as many as two dozen bombs loaded with more than 1,000 pounds of explosives on Chasiv Yar daily, according to the Ukrainian Air Force. Khortytsia operational-strategic group spokesperson Nazar Voloshyn claimed in June 2024 that Russian forces were attacking Chasiv Yar with thermobaric weapons, particularly the TOS-1A Solntsepyok multiple rocket launcher. "These are the kind of ammunition that burn and destroy everything in their path. They want to ensure that our defenders have nowhere to defend from," said Voloshyn.

On 9 July 2024, Euromaidan Press described Russian assault tactics during the battle, writing that before each assault the Russians typically deployed "a small squad of infantry to detect Ukrainian firing positions, then call in artillery and thermobaric systems to target them ... aiming to disrupt Ukrainian communications and prevent reinforcements from arriving in the area." Russian troops increasingly utilized all-terrain vehicles (ATVs) and motorcycles for transport as the battle progressed, with Euromaidan Press speculating that heavy armored vehicle losses possibly forced Russian squad commanders to utilize motorcycles for increased speed and mobility against Ukrainian cluster munitions and FPV drones, though with negligible results. Ukrainian servicemen acknowledged that the usage of motorcycles and ATVs made it more difficult for drone teams to reconnoiter Russian movements, positions and gathering points behind front lines. In August 2024, retired Ukrainian colonel Serhiy Hrabskyi described Russian dismounted infantry tactics as costly for them, but said numerical superiority allowed them to keep advancing.

== See also ==
- List of military engagements during the Russian invasion of Ukraine
- Battle of Toretsk
- Battle of Avdiivka (2023–2024)
- Battle of Bakhmut
- Chasiv Yar missile strike
