= Kalinovka =

Kalinovka may refer to:

- Kalinovka, Hajigabul, a village in Azerbaijan
- Kalinovka, Masally, a village in Azerbaijan
- Kalinovka, Kazakhstan, a settlement in Almaty Province of Kazakhstan
- Kalinovka, Russia, name of several rural localities in Russia
- The Russian-language name of Kalynivka (disambiguation), several locations in Ukraine
