= Human wave attack =

Military tactic

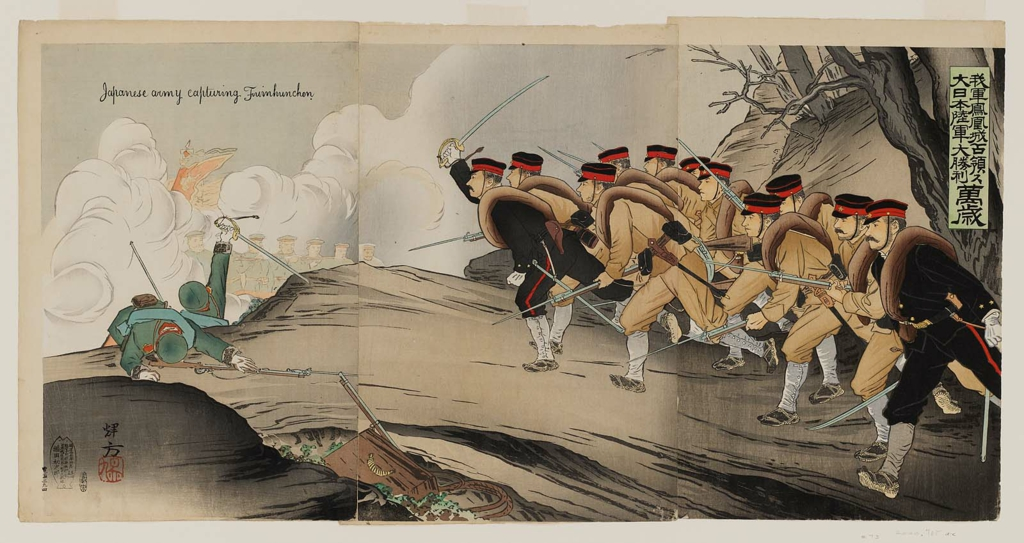
Japanese woodcut print depicting an infantry charge in the Russo-Japanese War

A human wave attack, also known as a human sea attack, is an offensive infantry tactic in which an attacker conducts an unprotected frontal assault with densely concentrated infantry formations against the enemy line, intended to overrun and overwhelm the defenders by engaging in hand-to-hand combat. The name refers to the concept of a coordinated mass of soldiers falling upon an enemy force and sweeping them away with sheer weight and momentum, like an ocean wave breaking on a beach.

== Definition ==
According to U.S. Army analyst Edward C. O'Dowd, the technical definition of a human wave attack tactic is a frontal assault by densely concentrated infantry formations against an enemy line, without any attempts to shield or to mask the attacker's movement. The goal of a human wave attack is to maneuver as many people as possible into close range, hoping that the shock from a large mass of attackers engaged in melee combat would force the enemy to disintegrate or fall back.

The human wave attack's reliance on melee combat usually makes the organization and the training of the attacking force irrelevant, but it requires either great physical courage, coercion, or morale for the attackers to advance into enemy fire. However, when matched against modern weaponry such as automatic firearms, artillery and aircraft, a human wave attack is an extremely dangerous and costly tactic in the face of devastating firepower. Thus, for a human wave attack to succeed on the modern battlefield, it is imperative for the attackers to charge into the enemy line in the shortest time and in the greatest numbers possible, so that a sufficient mass can be preserved when the attackers reach melee range.

However, this solution usually means that the attackers must sacrifice concealment and cover for numbers and speed. Because of this trade-off, human wave attacks can be used by an attacker which lacks tactical training or one which lacks firepower and the ability to manoeuvre, but which can motivate and control its personnel.

== Use ==
Human wave attacks have been used by several armed forces around the world, including European and American armies during the American Civil War and World War I, the Boxers during the Boxer Rebellion, the Spanish Republican Army during the Spanish Civil War, the Red Army, the Imperial Japanese Army and the National Revolutionary Army during World War II, the People's Volunteer Army and the Korean People's Army Ground Force during the Korean War, the People's Army of Vietnam and the People's Liberation Army during the Vietnam War and Sino-Vietnamese War, the Iranian Basij during the Iran–Iraq War, and the Russian Ground Forces and its allies in the Russo-Ukrainian War.

=== Boxer Rebellion ===
Human wave attacks were used during the Boxer Rebellion (1899–1901) in China. Boxer rebels performed human wave attacks against Eight-Nation Alliance forces during the Seymour Expedition and the Battle of Langfang where the Eight Nation Alliance was forced to retreat.

On 11 and 14 June 1900, Boxers armed only with bladed melee weapons directly charged the Alliance troops at Langfang armed with rifles and machine guns in human wave attacks and the Boxers also blocked the retreat of the expedition via train by destroying the Tianjin-Langfang railway.

The Boxers and Dong Fuxiang's army worked together in the joint ambush with the Boxers relentlessly assaulting the Allies head on with human wave attacks displaying "no fear of death" and engaging the Allies in melee combat and putting the Allied troops under severe mental stress by mimicking vigorous gunfire with firecrackers. The Allies however suffered most of their losses at the hands of General Dong's troops, who used their expertise and persistence to engage in "bold and persistent" assaults on the Alliance forces, as remembered by the German Captain Usedom: the right wing of the Germans was almost at the point of collapse under the attack until they were rescued from Langfang by French and British troops; the Allies then retreated from Langfang in trains full of bullet holes.

=== Russo-Japanese War ===
During the Siege of Port Arthur (1904–1905), human wave attacks were conducted on Russian artillery and machine guns by the Japanese which ended up becoming suicidal. Since the Japanese suffered massive casualties in the attacks, one description of the aftermath was that "a thick, unbroken mass of corpses covered the cold earth like a coverlet."

=== Spanish Republicans ===
Human wave attacks were also deployed by the Republicans in Spain during the Spanish Civil War most notably their defense of Casa de Campo during the Siege of Madrid, particularly the counterattack by the Durruti Column led by Buenaventura Durruti. Also, as recounted by various former members of the Lincoln Battalion, it was not uncommon for Republican commanders to order units onto attacks that were warned by field officers to be ill-advised or suicidal.

=== Soviet Red Army ===
There were elements of human waves being utilized in the Russian Civil War recounted by American soldiers in Russia supporting the White Army.

In the Winter War of 1939–1940 the Soviet Red Army used human wave charges repeatedly against fortified Finnish positions, allowing the enemy machine gunners to mow them down, a tactic described as "incomprehensible fatalism" by the Finnish commander Mannerheim. This led to massive losses on the Soviet side and contributed to why the clearly weaker Finnish forces (both in manpower and armament) were able to temporarily resist the Soviet attacks on the Karelian Isthmus. Soviet attacks in other sectors were successfully halted by the Finns.

The Soviet Red Army used human wave attacks in the Battle of Leningrad.

Richard Overy in his book, The Oxford History of World War II, talks about the eventual technological advancement of Soviet spearhead forces, becoming as effective as German forces, however he still acknowledges that elements of "unthinkable self-sacrifice, 'human wave' tactics, and draconian punishment" existed.

=== Imperial Japanese Army ===
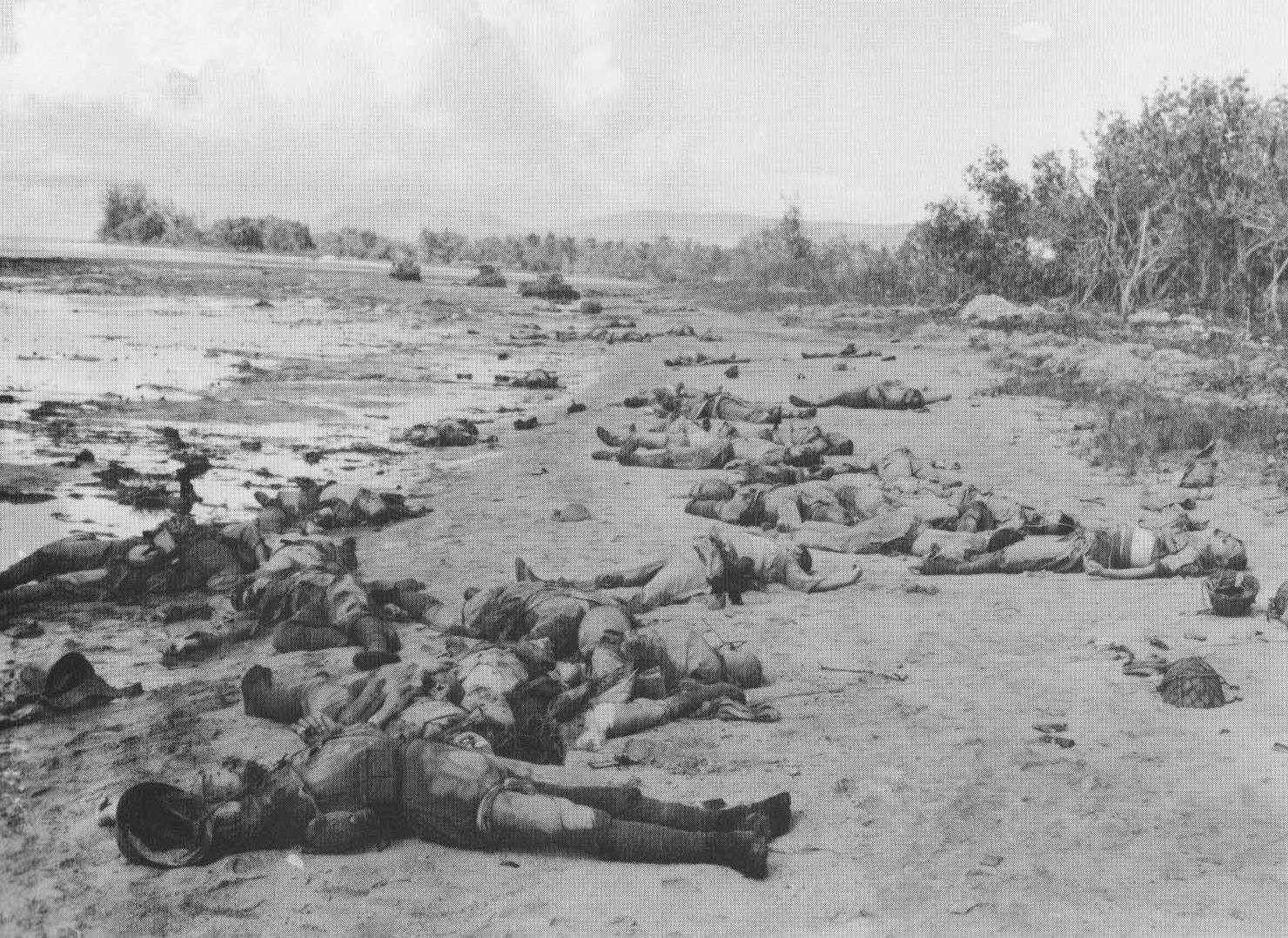
Dead Japanese soldiers lie on the beach after a failed banzai charge during the Battle of Guadalcanal, 1942

The Imperial Japanese Army was known for its use of human wave attacks. There were even specialized units who were trained in this type of assault.

The charge was used successfully in the Russo-Japanese War and the Second Sino-Japanese War, where the highly disciplined Japanese soldiers were fighting against enemies with comparatively lower discipline and without many automatic weapons such as machine guns, oftentimes outnumbering them as well. In such instances, a determined charge could break into the enemy lines and win the day. The effectiveness of such strategies in China made them a standard tactic for the Imperial Japanese Army. These tactics became mostly known to Western audiences during the Pacific War, where Japanese forces used this approach against Allied forces. However, Allied forces drastically outnumbered the Japanese, and they were equipped with a very high number of automatic weapons. They also consisted of well-trained forces who would quickly adapt to Japanese charges. If the Allied forces could establish a defensive perimeter, their superior firepower would often result in crippling Japanese casualties and a failure of the attack. The Japanese battle-cry "Banzai" led to this form of charge being called the "Banzai charge" by the Allied forces.

In addition to its strategic use by Japanese military forces, the frequency of its use has been explained, in part, as Japanese troops adhering to their traditional Bushido honor code that viewed surrender as shameful or unacceptable, whereas the bravery of a human wave charge, even if suicidal, was an honorable choice. These banzai charges by Japanese soldiers against Allied troops equipped with machine guns, light mortars, semi-automatic rifles and sub-machine guns were often ineffective in altering the outcome of a battle, but American troops later reported severe psychological pressure from defending against these out-gunned human waves.

=== People's Volunteer Army ===
During the Korean War, the term "human wave attack" was used to describe the Chinese short attack, a combination of infiltration and shock tactics employed by the People's Volunteer Army (PVA). According to some accounts, Marshal Peng Dehuai—the overall commander of the PVA forces in Korea—is said to have invented this tactic.

A typical Chinese short attack was carried out at night by numerous fireteams on a narrow front against the weakest point in enemy defenses. The PVA assault team would crawl undetected within grenade range, then launch surprise attacks against the defenders in order to breach the defenses by relying on maximum shock and confusion. If the initial shock failed to breach the defenses, additional fireteams would press on behind them and attack the same point until a breach was created. Once penetration was achieved, the bulk of the Chinese forces would move into the enemy rear and attack from behind. During the attacks, the Chinese assault teams would disperse while masking themselves using the terrain, and this made it difficult for UN defenders to target numerous Chinese troops. Attacks by the successive Chinese fireteams were also carefully timed to minimize casualties. Due to primitive communication systems and tight political controls within the Chinese army, short attacks were often repeated indefinitely until either the defenses were penetrated or the attacker's ammunition supply were exhausted, regardless of the chances of success or the human cost.

This persistent attack pattern left a strong impression on UN forces that fought in Korea, giving birth to the description of "human wave." U.S. Army historian Roy Edgar Appleman observed that the term "human wave" was later used by journalists and military officials to convey the image that the American soldiers were assaulted by overwhelming numbers of Chinese on a broad front. S.L.A. Marshall also commented that the word "mass" was indiscriminately used by the media to describe Chinese infantry tactics, and it is rare for the Chinese to actually use densely concentrated infantry formations to absorb enemy firepower. In response to the media's stereotype of Chinese assault troops deployed in vast "human seas", a joke circulated among the US servicemen was "How many hordes are there in a Chinese platoon?"

In Chinese sources, this tactic is referred to as "three-three fireteams," after the composition of the attack: three men would form one fireteam, and three fireteams would form one squad. A Chinese platoon, consisting of 33 to 50 soldiers (depending on if they had a heavy weapons team), would form their squads in ranks in a staggered arrowhead formation, which would be employed to attack "one point" from "two sides."

Although abandoned by the PVA by 1953, outside observers such as Allen S. Whiting expected China to use the tactic if necessary. The Chinese army re-adopted this tactic during the Vietnam War and Sino-Vietnamese War due to the stagnation of the Chinese military modernization programs during the Cultural Revolution. Their use in the Vietnam War and Sino-Vietnamese War is a rare example of an army with superior firepower, in this case the PLA, throwing away its advantage.

After China's Reform and Opening Up, the phrase "human wave tactics" became used adopted as a metaphor in cinematic and theatrical criticism. In this artistic context, it is used to criticize productions which are perceived as overly reliant on crowd formations as a technique for visual interest instead of developing narrative substance.

=== Iran–Iraq War ===
During the Iran–Iraq War, some of the attacks conducted by Iranian forces in large operations, were considered to be human wave attacks.

=== Eritrean-Ethiopian War ===
In the Eritrean–Ethiopian War of 1998-2000, the widespread use of trenches has resulted in comparisons of the conflict to the trench warfare of World War I. According to some reports, trench warfare led to the loss of "thousands of young lives in human-wave assaults on Eritrea's positions".

=== Russian invasion of Ukraine ===
==== Russian military ====
During the Russian invasion of Ukraine starting in 2022, the Ukrainian military, Western media and prominent Russian milbloggers have reported that the Russian military uses human wave attacks to overcome Ukrainian defenses.

During the battles of Bakhmut, Vuhledar, and Avdiivka, it was reported that Russian Army regulars were sent into the battles using human wave tactics to capture the towns. Wagner Group paramilitary units also used "human wave attacks" using convicts recruited from prisons to fight in Ukraine, including those in the Storm-Z and Storm-V units. It was also reported that the Russian infantry sent in "human wave" attacks are poorly trained and equipped, with minimal or no mechanized or air support. Rear Admiral John Kirby, spokesperson for the U.S. National Security Council, said that Russia threw "masses of poorly trained soldiers right into the battlefield without proper equipment, and apparently without proper training and preparation." Russian troops have said that they were threatened with being shot by barrier troops if they retreated from attacks.

The term "meat grinder" has been used to describe these tactics used by Russia in attempts to wear down Ukrainian forces and expose their positions to Russian artillery. According to NATO and Western military officials, around 1,200 Russian soldiers were killed or wounded in Ukraine every day on average in May and June 2024, mainly due to the use of Soviet tactics and human wave attacks. These attacks have also been compared to the Imperial Japanese Army's banzai charges.

In February 2026, the BBC released interviews with Russian soldiers who described their commanders sending waves of what Russian soldiers call "meat storms" at Ukrainian positions, with one of the soldiers describing an instance where 200 soldiers in his regiment were killed in three days.

In May 2026, an article from The Telegraph said the use of the "meat grinder" strategy was being phased out in favour of using smaller, slow, concealed infiltration units that push through gaps in Ukrainian front-line positions and regroup behind Ukrainian lines. According to the Critical Threats Project, infiltration tactics have been more effective than the "meat grinder" tactics.

==== North Korean military ====
North Korean troops were deployed to Russia in October 2024 to aid Russia in the Ukrainian Kursk offensive; their initial attacks on Ukrainian positions were described as "human wave attacks" in December 2024 by Kirby, who assessed that the attacks had resulted in over 1,000 killed and wounded North Korean soldiers in one week on the front. He added that it was "clear" that Russian and North Korean military leaders saw the North Koreans as "expendable". Later estimates of North Korean casualties in the Kursk offensive estimated approximately 1500 wounded and 2300-3000 killed in action.

After these initial attacks, North Korean forces updated their doctrine and adopted small-unit tactics similar to other modern militaries, rather than the Korean War doctrines which emphasized mass attacks of large numbers of soldiers and were largely still in effect when North Korean troops were initially deployed. Eventually, in 2025, North Korean forces entirely ceased to be part of active combat operations.

== See also ==
- Attrition warfare
- Cannon fodder
- Swarming (military)
- Creeping barrage
- M18 Claymore – land mine designed in 1952 as a response to human wave attacks in Korea
- Zerg rush, similar tactic used in video games and genre fiction.
