= Meyniman =

Meyniman may refer to:

- Meyniman (village), Azerbaijan
- Birinci Meyniman, Azerbaijan
- İkinci Meyniman, Azerbaijan
