= Kalinovka, Azerbaijan =

Kalinovka, Azerbaijan may refer to:

- Kalinovka, Hajigabul
- Kalinovka, Masally
