= Kalynivka =

Kalynivka is a widespread toponym in Ukraine and is a Ukrainian variation of the Russian-based Kalinovka.

== Populated places ==
- Kalynivka, Horlivka Raion, Donetsk Oblast
- Kalynivka, Bakhmut Raion, Donetsk Oblast
- Kalynivka, Brovary Raion, Kyiv Oblast
- Kalynivka, Fastiv Raion, Kyiv Oblast
- Kalynivka, Dovzhansk Raion, Luhansk Oblast
- Kalynivka, Vinnytsia Oblast

== Rivers ==
Besides populated places, at least 4 rivers have this name.

== See also ==
- Kalinovka (disambiguation)
