= Russian penal military units during the Russian invasion of Ukraine =

Prisoners in the Russian military

During the Russian invasion of Ukraine, Russia has recruited substantial numbers of prisoners into military units. The Foreign Intelligence Service of Ukraine has claimed that Russia has recruited between 140,000 and 180,000 convicts to fight Ukraine.

The Russian paramilitary Wagner Group widely recruited from prisons starting in 2022, growing their forces by an estimated 40,000. According to The New York Times, Wagner's prison recruitment campaign began in early July 2022, when Prigozhin personally appeared in prisons around St. Petersburg and offered deals to the prisoners. However, the Wagner Group lost access to the prisons in February 2023 amidst schisms with the regular Russian Ministry of Defense. The Russian MoD itself reportedly began recruiting prisoners in October 2022.

In April 2023, information emerged about the creation of the Storm-Z series of units by the MoD. After receiving only ten to fifteen days of training, these units are attached to regular Russian forces suffering from battle fatigue. On 24 June 2023, Vladimir Putin signed a law on the recruitment of convicts to contract service with the Defense Ministry, disbanding Storm-Z and replacing it with the new Storm-V units.

== Motivation ==
The United Kingdom's Ministry of Defense described the recruitment as part of a "broader, intense effort by the Russian military to bolster its numbers, while attempting to avoid implementing new mandatory mobilisation, which would be very unpopular with the Russian public."

The Institute for the Study of War (ISW) said that the increase in Ministry of Defense prison recruitment in June 2023 came in "the wake of significant losses in Ukraine".

== Use and treatment ==
In a September 2022 speech to prisoners, Yevgeny Prigozhin, leader of the Wagner Group, said that recruits would be used as shock troops, who lead attacks and take heavy casualties. Experts and captured Wagner soldiers said that prisoner recruits were used as "little more than cannon fodder".

Thousands of Wagner convict soldiers played a key role in the Battle of Bakhmut, taking part in wave attacks against Ukrainian positions. Ukrainian media has said that the convicts are "dumped onto the front after 2–3 weeks of poor training and used as cannon fodder" by the more elite, well-trained Wagner group commanders.

In the September 2022 speech, Prigozhin also said that any prisoner who joined and then attempted to flee service would be "considered a deserter and shot". In March 2023, United Nations experts expressed concern over allegations that recruits are "regularly threatened and ill-treated by their superiors", and said they had information that "several recruits have been executed for attempting to escape and, in other cases, seriously injured in public as a warning to other recruits." They described the tactics as human rights violations and said that they "may amount to war crimes".

By March 2023, the British Ministry of Defense said that about half of the recruited Wagner prisoners had been killed or wounded in Ukraine. In November 2023, British intelligence noted that Russian commanders would often punish soldiers who abuse drugs and alcohol by forcing them to fight in Storm-Z detachments.

The Institute for the Study of War noted in February 2025 that Russia had mostly exhausted its prison population in 2022 and 2023 and could no longer generate significant forces from inmates. It also noted that the Russian government deprived prisoners who volunteer to fight in Ukraine of one-time enlistment bonuses starting 1 January 2025.

== Release of prisoners and consequences ==
Under the Wagner model, prisoners who survive a six-month term on the front are released into Russian society and given a pardon for their crimes. Many of the released men are hardened criminals. Russians fear that the released men will continue to commit more crimes. In August 2023, a convicted criminal freed after fighting with Wagner was arrested on accusations of stabbing six people to death in the town of Derevyannoye in Russia's Republic of Karelia.

Olga Romanova of Russia Behind Bars said that as a result of this policy, "There are no more crimes, and no more punishments. Anything is permissible now, and this brings very far-reaching consequences for any country."

While many of the Russian prisoners recruited by Wagner and Storm-Z were guaranteed release if they survived their six-month term, those who join the new Storm-V units have to serve until the end of the conflict.

== See also ==
- Prisons in Russia
- Ukrainian penal military units during the Russian invasion of Ukraine
- Russian irregular units in Ukraine
- Shtrafbat
