= 41st Mechanized Brigade =

Ukrainian Ground Forces unit

- 41 окрема механізована бригада
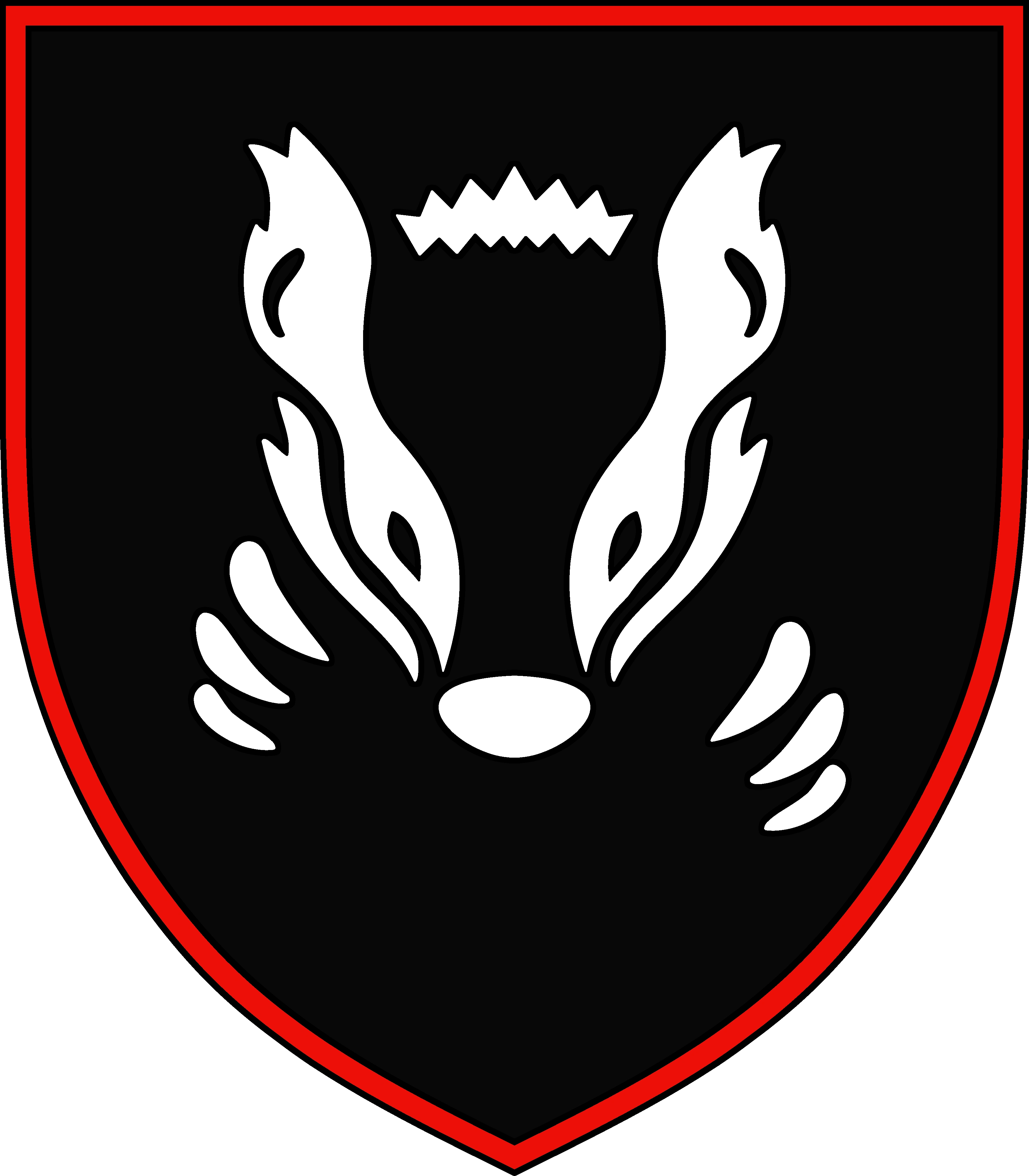
- Shoulder Sleeve Insignia
- Country: Ukraine
- Branch: Ukrainian Ground Forces
- Role: Mechanized Infantry
- Part of: Operational Command South
- Engagements: Russo-Ukrainian War
- Website: https://www.facebook.com/41ombr

Insignia
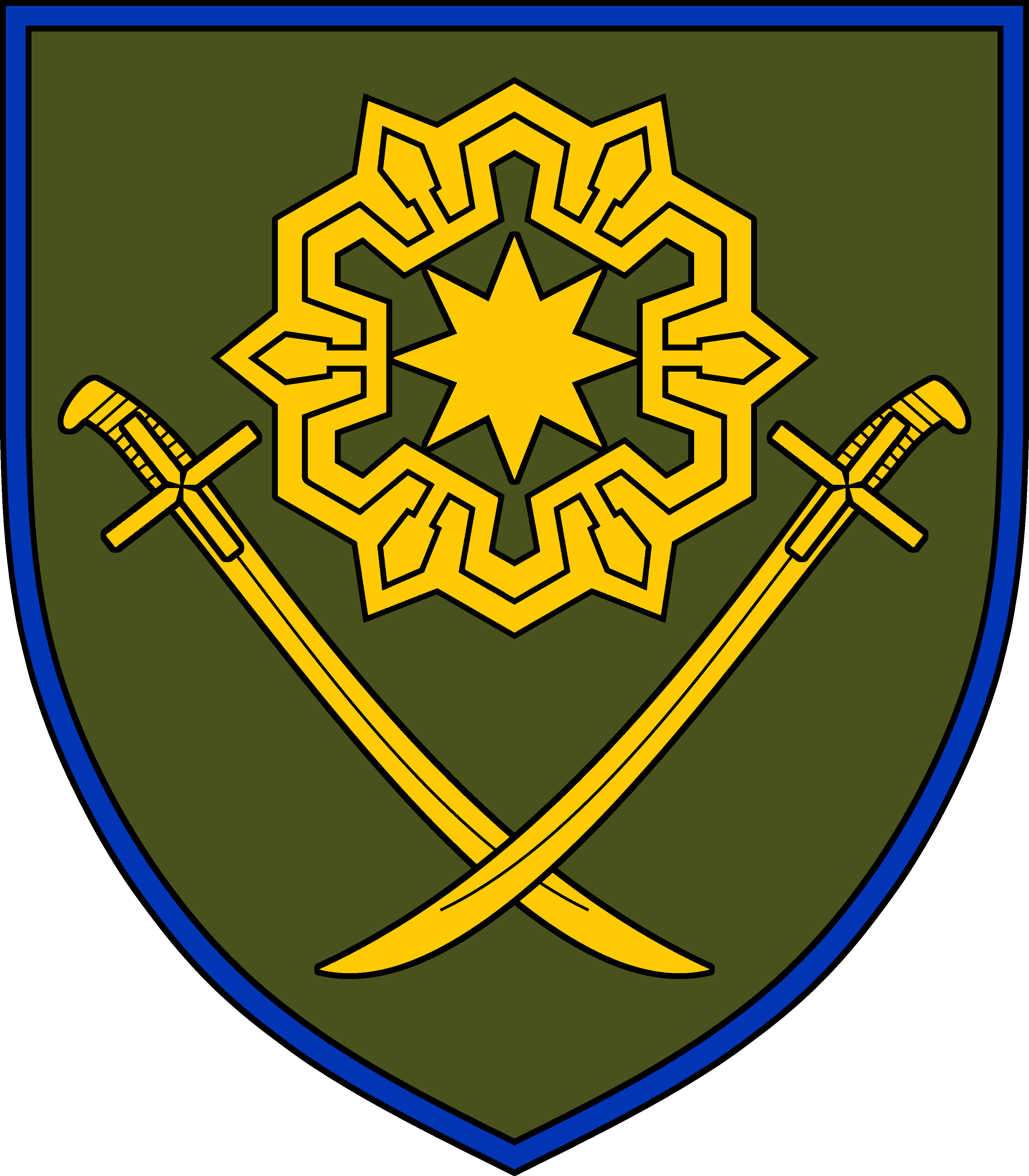
- Former sleeve patch

The 41st Mechanized Brigade (Ukrainian: 41 окрема механізована бригада) is a brigade of the Ukrainian Ground Forces.

== History ==
In the spring of 2024, the 41st Mechanized Brigade took part in the combat at Chasiv Yar in Donetsk Oblast, and in the summer it fought on the Toretsk front. The 41st Brigade was rotated to Toretsk and Niu-York to replace the 24th Mechanized Brigade, but was not able to hold the positions that it had inherited from the 24th Brigade. As a result, Russian forces managed to overrun a defensive line that previous Ukrainian forces had defended for 2.5 years.

During October 2024, it was reported that the brigade was taking part in the Ukrainian operation in Russia's Kursk Oblast.

== Command ==
Commanders:

- 2023–2024: Colonel Oleg Serhiyovych Makukha
- 2024: Colonel Serhiy Pavlovych Romashko
- 2025: Colonel Volodymyr Dzyuba

== Structure ==
As of 2023 the brigade's structure is as follows:

- 41st Mechanized Brigade,
  - Headquarters & Headquarters Company
  - 1st Mechanized Battalion
  - 2nd Mechanized Battalion
  - 3rd Mechanized Battalion
  - Tank Battalion
  - Artillery Group
  - Anti-Aircraft Defense Battalion
  - Reconnaissance Company
  - Engineer Battalion
  - Logistic Battalion
  - Maintenance Battalion
  - Signal Company
  - Radar Company
  - Medical Company
  - Chemical, Biological, Radiological and Nuclear Protection Company
