= Dnipro – Donbas Canal =

Canal in eastern Ukraine

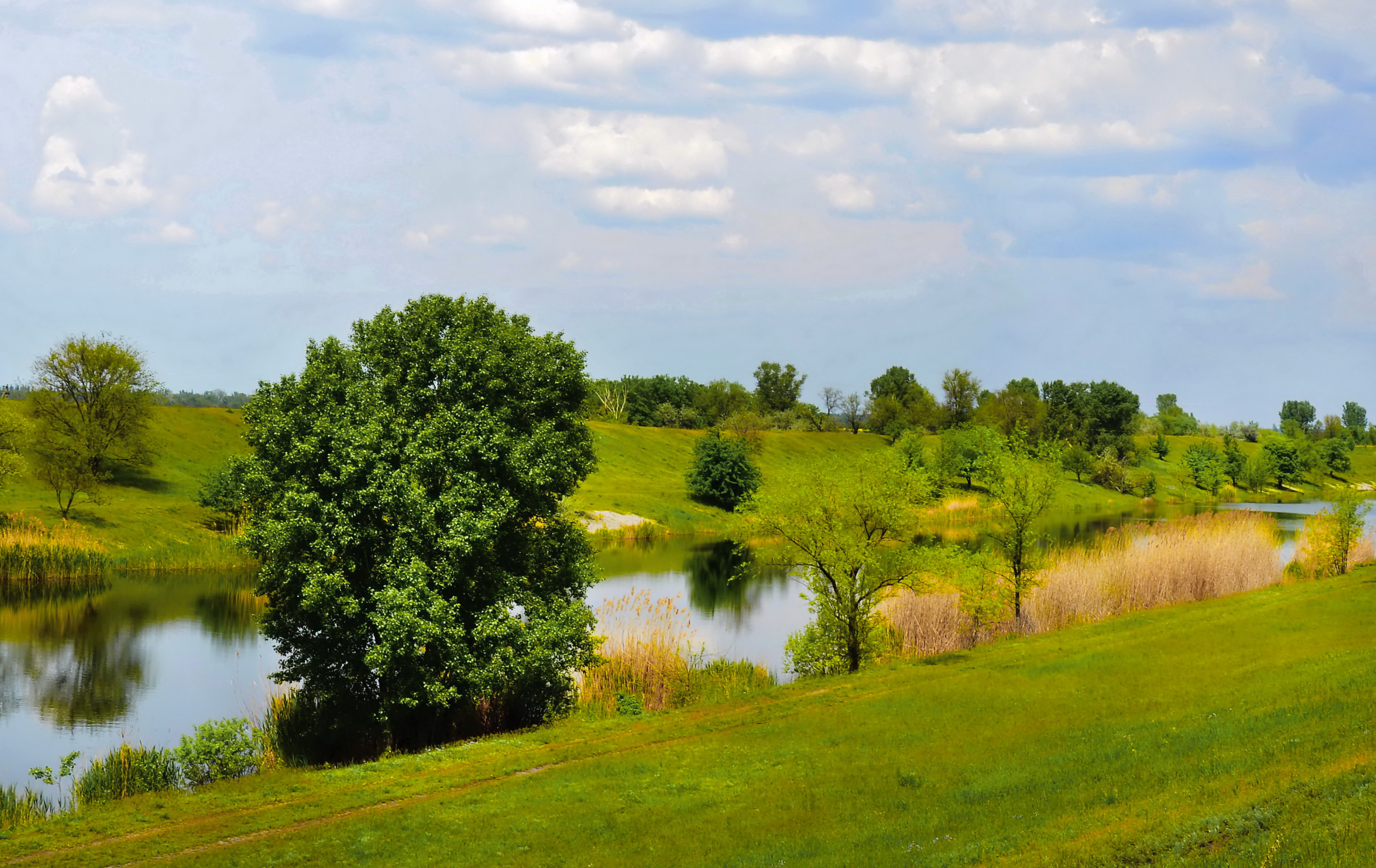
- Scenery near the canal
- Interactive map of Dnipro – Donbas Canal
- Location: Dnipropetrovsk Oblast; Kharkiv Oblast
- Country: Ukraine

Specifications
- Length: 263 km (163 miles)

History
- Date completed: 1981

Geography
- Direction: East
- Start point: Dnipro
- End point: Siverskyi Donets
- Beginning coordinates: 48°44′10″N 34°18′38″E
- Ending coordinates: 49°10′21″N 36°59′09″E

The Dnipro – Donbas Canal (Ukrainian: Канал Дніпро — Донбас, romanized: Kanal Dnipro — Donbas), also known as Dnieper – Donbass Canal (Russian: Канал Днепр — Донбасс, romanized: Kanal Dnepr — Donbass) is a canal in Eastern Ukraine, connecting the Siverskyi Donets with the Dnipro River. The canal is mainly to improve the area's depleted water supplies, and is one of the largest canals in the Dnipro basin.

== History ==
Throughout the 20th century, Soviet industrialization depleted the freshwater supplies in eastern Ukraine. With the construction of Siverskyi Donets – Donbas Canal in the 1950s, the main source in Siverskyi Donets became further depleted.

Construction of a new canal between the Dnipro and the Donbas region began in 1969, and was originally planned on two stages: the first from the Dnipro river to near Izium, and the second towards the city of Donetsk. The first section opened in 1981, but construction of the second section (which would have added a further 171 kilometres (106 mi), taking the canal onwards from the Krasnopavlivka Reservoir to the Karlivka Reservoir near the city of Donetsk) was suspended, and that section never opened.

== Characteristics ==
The canal starts at the Dnipro river in Dnipropetrovsk Oblast, and presently ends at the Siverskyi Donets in Kharkiv Oblast, with a length of 263 kilometres (163 mi).

== See also ==
- North Crimean Canal
- Siverskyi Donets – Donbas Canal
