= Koktobe, Eskeldi District =

Koktobe
- Village
- Location in Kazakhstan
- Coordinates: 45°05′55″N 78°42′20″E
- Country: Kazakhstan
- Region: Jetisu Region
- Time zone: UTC+6 (Omsk Time)

Koktobe (Kazakh: Көктөбе, Köktöbe), previously Kalinovka, is a village in Jetisu Region, in south-eastern Kazakhstan.
