= Storm-Z =

Russian penal military units

- Шторм-Z
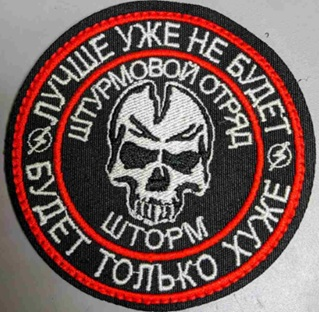
- Chevron (insignia) of the Russian penal military unit "Storm-Z"
- Active: April 6 – June 24, 2023 (Note: Storm-Z units appear to have been grandfathered with existing units being allowed to continue operations, but June 24 is when the Putin decreed their disbanding and replacing them with Storm-V units.)
- Country: Russia
- Branch: Russian Armed Forces
- Type: Infantry
- Role: Penal military unit
- Size: 170,000 (claimed by Ukraine) 1,400 (reported by Russia)
- Engagements: Russian invasion of Ukraine: 2023 Ukrainian counteroffensive; Eastern Ukraine campaign; Battle of Avdiivka; Battle of Chasiv Yar; Wagner Group rebellion

Commanders
- Current commander: Yevgeny Burdinsky
- Notable commanders: Ali (callsign); Aslan Shurdumov; Vladislav "Kornet" Olensky

Storm-Z (Russian: Шторм-Z, romanized: Shtorm-Z) is a series of penal military units established by Russia by 6 April 2023, at the latest. On 24 June 2023 Russian president Vladimir Putin signed a law disbanding Storm-Z and replacing it with new Storm-V units. However, on 12 February 2024, Dmytro Riumshyn, the commander of Ukraine's 47th Mechanized Brigade, claimed that Russian forces were deploying regular troops, sabotage groups, as well as both "Storm-Z" and "Storm-V" penal units in Avdiivka.

== History ==
=== Formation ===
The existence of the Storm-Z units was first uncovered on April 6, 2023, when Ukrainian forces captured documents detailing their penal recruitment and formations. The Russian Ministry of Defence modeled the units after the Wagner Group's penal recruitment after their falling out with Wagner's former leader, Yevgeny Prigozhin. The unit's members are recruited from Russian prisons on the premise that successful service would result in a deduction of their sentence, as well as earn them $2,200 a month. The Institute for the Study of War assessed that the Storm-Z units would be attached to Russian forces undergoing battle fatigue. They also reported that each company consisted of 100 men broken into four capture squads of 10 persons each, four fire support squads of 10 persons each, a 2-person command element, a 5-person combat engineering group, an 8-person reconnaissance group, a 3-person medevac group, and a 2-person UAV crew. Each company would only receive 10 to 15 days of training before being sent into active combat, namely in urban fighting in the Battle of Bakhmut and the Battle of Avdiivka. Various Russian commands and units have had Storm-Z companies attached to them, first seeing service in the 8th Guards Combined Arms Army of Russia and the 1st Army Corps, the armed forces of the self-proclaimed Donetsk People's Republic. British intelligence has stated that Russian commanders often punish soldiers who abuse drugs and alcohol by forcing them to fight in Storm-Z detachments. According to both British intelligence and Russian military bloggers, Storm-Z have been sustaining between 40 and 70% losses attempting to take the city of Avdiivka.

=== Ukrainian counteroffensive ===
Storm-Z fighters have said that their units suffer from incompetent leadership, lack of supplies, and faulty equipment. Three Storm-Z POWs told CNN of routinely malfunctioning artillery, inaccurate rocket barrages, and commanders under the influence of painkillers giving "nonsensical orders". They also said that obtaining food and water required hiking 5 km (3 mi) through a minefield. The units also suffer from low morale and when given the chance they surrender to Ukrainian forces in high numbers. During the opening days of the 2023 Ukrainian counteroffensive a large contingent of penal-soldiers, as well as draftees, surrendered in the Battle of Velyka Novosilka. These prisoners confirmed reports that veteran units of the Russian army are positioned behind units consisting of penal-soldiers and draftees, acting as barrier troops to shoot any that try to retreat or surrender. Shortly after, one such instance of barrier forces opening fire on retreating Russian units was captured on film by a Ukrainian drone. Storm-Z units were also deployed to the Svatove–Kreminna line performing "highly attritional attacks" against Ukrainian positions with two Russian Airborne Forces divisions, the 76th and 98th Guards Airborne Divisions acting as their barrier forces.

Storm-Z units were also notably used to reinforce Russian positions on the east bank of the Dnipro, namely to counter the Ukrainian crossing at Krynky. Both Ukrainian and independent analysts reported high casualties in the units, that attempted 10 to 15 person assaults on Ukrainian positions for months straight, resulting in hundreds of convicts dying due to lack of armor, air, and artillery support. This has resulted in other Russian units needing to increase their responsibilities in the region, as Russian command ran out of Storm-Z units to deploy. Oleg Sinyegubov, head of the Kharkiv Regional Military Administration, reported that Storm-Z units were deployed to the border in Belgorod Oblast, as a garrison following the 2023 Belgorod Oblast incursions as a "demonstrative action" and an effort to deter further incursions.

During the Battle of Neskuchne, Storm-Z units were used by the 60th Separate Motorized Rifle Brigade to bolster their defensive efforts against an attack by the 129th Territorial Defense Brigade. Despite the 60th outnumbering the 129th, even before the addition of the Storm-Z units, Russian forces lost the battle, with the village being liberated by Ukraine by 11 June 2023. Storm-Z units also took part in the fighting around Sieverne and Avdiivka being used for early probing assaults, often without heavy support, to gauge Ukrainian defenses.

=== Wagner rebellion ===
During the Wagner Group rebellion, several Storm-Z units pledged their loyalty to the Wagner Group and vowed to help Yevgeny Prigozhin topple the Russian military structure. However, after Prigozhin ended the rebellion and turned his convoys around shortly outside Moscow, these Storm-Z units accused him of "cowardice" and stated that he had “double-crossed them”. They went on to say that due to their support for Wagner, their commanders have begun issuing punishments to disloyal units. The Storm-Z units are overseen by the Head of the General Staff's Main Organizational and Mobilization Directorate Colonel General Yevgeni Burdinskiy who has been heavily criticized by Russian nationalists for his inability to account for all the Storm-Z units.

== Storm Gladiator ==
Storm-Z's special assault unit, Storm Gladiator, was established in September 2023 when Russia was performing limited localized counterattacks as part of the Eastern Ukraine campaign as a response to the Ukrainian counterattack. Gladiator used to be one of the many battalion sized Storm-Z units, that was noted for its high efficiency in its operations, for the physical condition of its members, and their loyalty to the Russian ministry of defense. Dmitry Knayev, a captured member of Gladiator, on 5 February 2024, reported that members where selected based on their physical condition, their unmarried status, and their military or law enforcement experience. He also went on to claim that the unit was personally trained by both the rebranded Wagner Group, and Akhmat 'special forces'.

Gladiator notably saw combat during the Battle of Robotyne, having other Storm-Z units attached to it, acting as those unit's barrier forces. Captured members of the unit claim Gladiator suffered up to 60% fatalities during the autumn of 2023. The unit was part of the 58th Guards Combined Arms Army and commanded by Colonel Aslan Shurdumov, who was arrested for a 2013 murder, and organized by Vladislav Olensky, an FSB agent arrested in 2012 for extortion. Due to its high fatalities was disbanded shortly into winter with its members being spread through other Storm-Z units as veteran officers.

== Criticisms ==
Survivors of Storm-Z actions have a reputation to surrender and defect to Ukrainian personnel at the earliest opportunity, routinely reporting that Storm-Z units suffer gross fatalities during their operations, and are coordinated by officers who do not respect their lives, with Russian president Vladimir Putin going so far as to call them "meat." Storm-Z personnel also consistently report that the units see no combat training, simply being given old surplus, if they're lucky, before being shipped to the front where most members die in their first operations. Survivors who are lucky enough to return home also report the denial of pay, and benefits. Additionally, there are reports that officers execute Storm-Z personnel who protest the conditions and attempt to organize the fighters to push for rations and equipment. Loved ones of killed convicts also report that the Russian Ministry of Defense refuses to hand over their bodies and belongings to their families.

Personnel of the conventional Russian army are often times sent to Storm-Z units as a form of punishment, namely for being caught drinking while on duty. Additionally, Russian personnel are sent to Storm-Z units if they are caught doing drugs, or for general disobedience to their commanding officers.

== Disbanding ==
On 24 June 2023, Vladimir Putin signed a law on the recruitment of convicts to contract service with the Defense Ministry, disbanding Storm-Z and replacing it with the new Storm-V units. The notable difference between the two is that Storm-Z contracts promised a pardon at the end of service, while the Storm-V units do not, meaning the convicts are returned to prison upon the completion of their service. As of mid-April 2024, Mediazona and the BBC reported that 1,910 Storm-Z and Storm-V convicts were killed, and had their identities confirmed.

== See also ==
- Z (military symbol)
- Russian penal military units
- Russian irregular units in Ukraine
- Shtrafbat
