= İkinci Meyniman =

- Municipality
- Location within Azerbaijan
- Coordinates: 40°03′08″N 48°43′07″E
- Country: Azerbaijan
- Rayon: Hajigabul

Population
  - Total: 300
- Time zone: UTC+4 (AZT)
  - Summer (DST): UTC+5 (AZT)

İkinci Meyniman (also, Meyniman and Meyniman Vtoroye) is a village and the least populous municipality in the Hajigabul Rayon of Azerbaijan. It has a population of 300.
