= Siverskyi Donets – Donbas Canal =

Canal in Donetsk Oblast, Ukraine

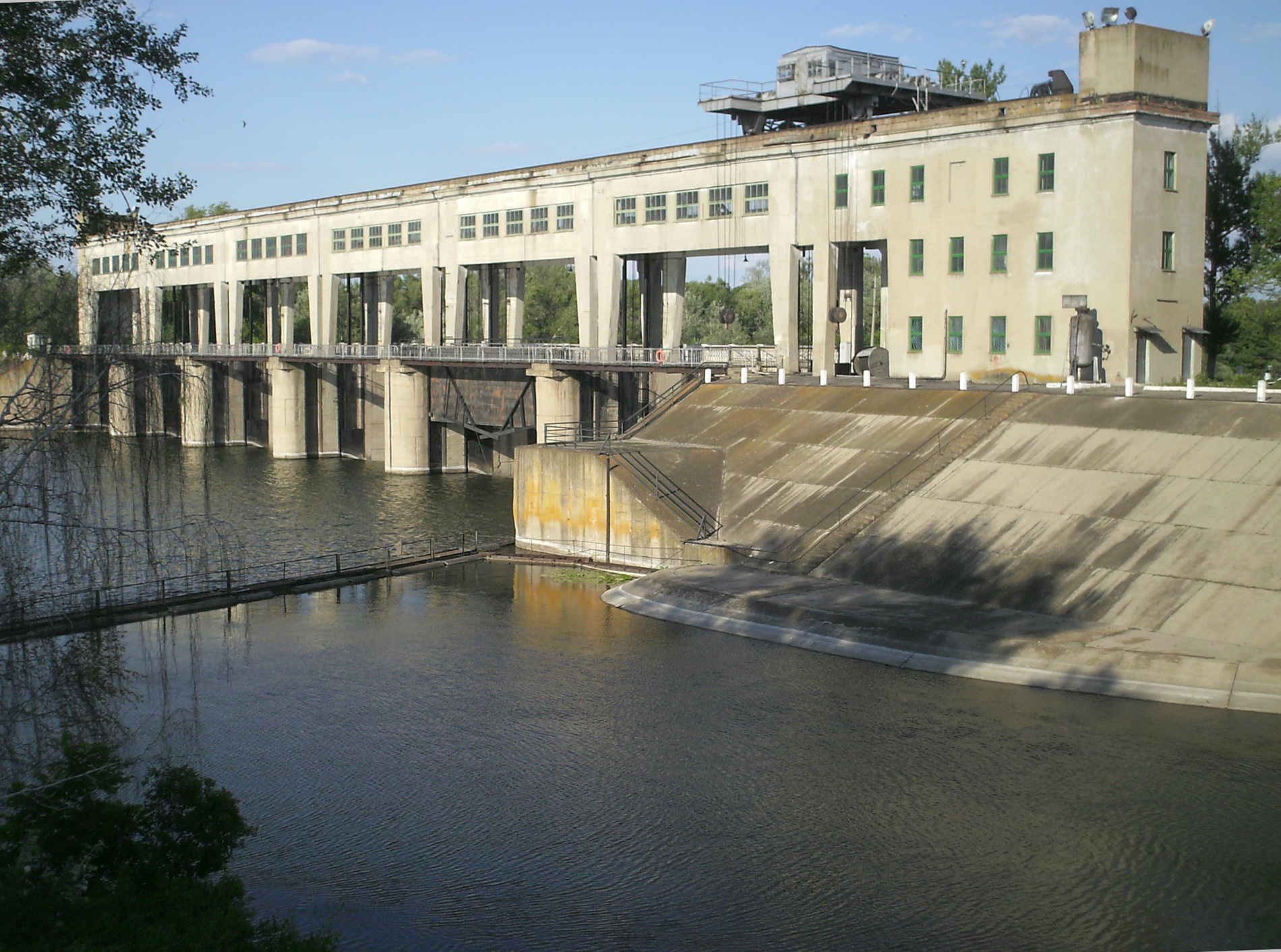
- The northern terminal of the canal, connecting with Siverskyi Donets
- Interactive map of Siverskyi Donets – Donbas Canal
- Location: Donetsk Oblast, Ukraine

Specifications
- Length: 133.4 km (82.9 miles)

History
- Date completed: 1958

Geography
- Direction: South
- Start point: Siverskyi Donets
- End point: Kalmius river
- Beginning coordinates: 48.915°N 37.751°E
- Ending coordinates: 48.106°N 37.877°E

The Siverskyi Donets – Donbas Canal (Ukrainian: Канал Сіверський Донець — Донбас, romanized: Kanal Siverskyi Donets — Donbas; Russian: Канал Северский Донец — Донбасс) is a canal in the Donetsk Oblast, Eastern Ukraine, connecting the Siverskyi Donets river with the Kalmius river. The canal was built in the 1950s to improve the area's water supplies.

== Location ==
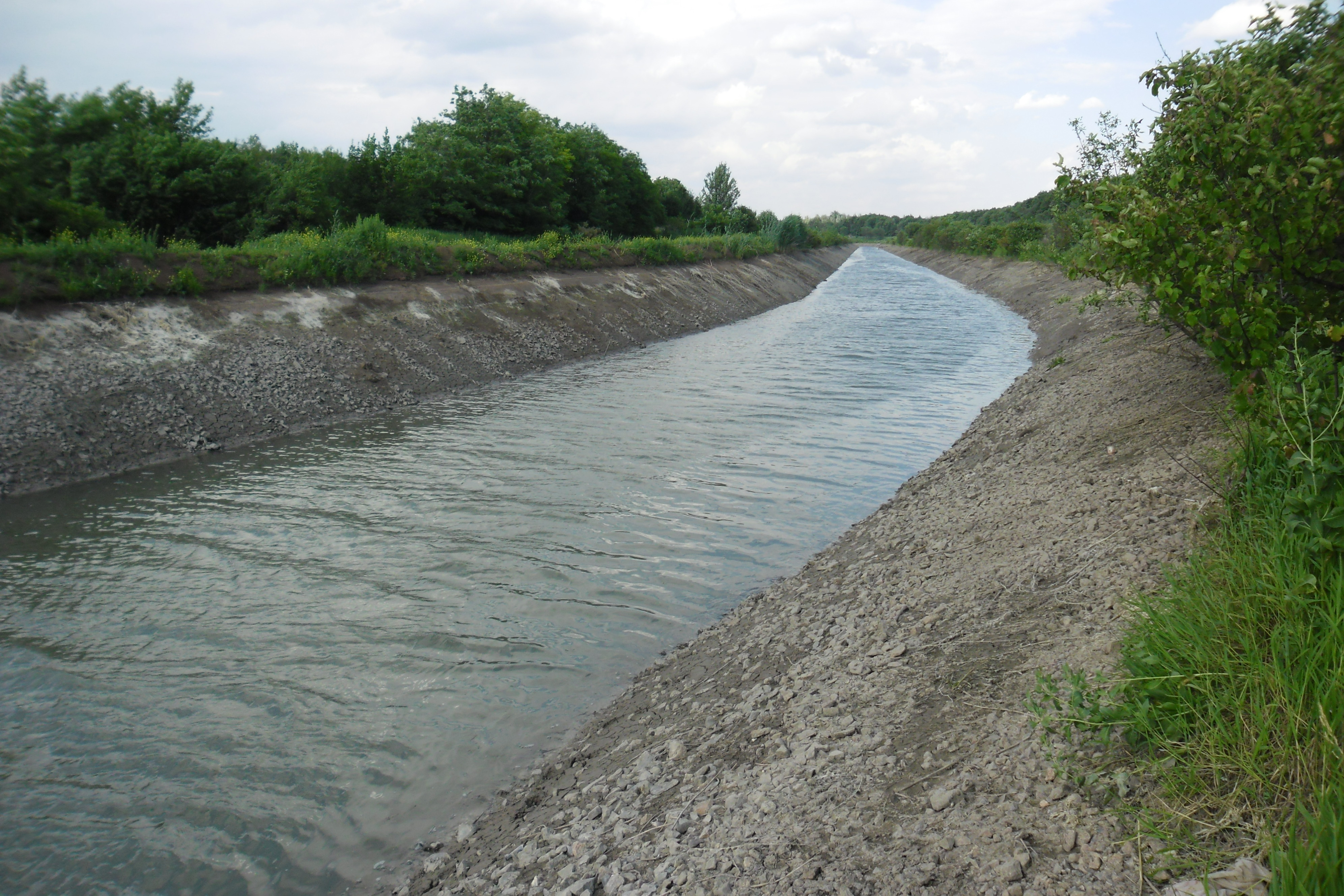
The canal in 2015

The canal starts near the village of Raihorodok, about 12.2 miles (19.6 km) northeast of Sloviansk, at the Siverskyi Donets. It runs southwards and ends near the city of Yasynuvata, about 11.6 miles (18.7 km) northeast of Donetsk, at the Kalmius River.

== History ==
During the 20th century, Soviet industrialization depleted supplies of fresh water in the Donbas region. The production of many industrial products, such as cast iron and steel, and coal mining require large amounts of fresh water. At the same time, mining in the area disrupted groundwater, making supplies even more scarce.

Construction of a canal to improve the supply of freshwater in the Donetsk Oblast began in 1955, and was completed by 1958. The canal was expanded in 1979 to increase its water capacity. In 2014, the canal was heavily damaged due to the War in Donbas. As of 2021, the canal was run by the state-owned company "Water of Donbas" (Вода Донбасу).

Since May 2023, the Don – Donbas pipeline has been supplying water to the canal.

== Russo Ukraine War ==
In 2014 after the battles of Horlivka and Yasynuvata this caused the southern parts of the Canal to be occupied by the DPR which stayed that way until 2022 when Russia Declared War on Ukraine in the Russo-Ukraine war In 2022 Russian Forces reached the northern part of the Canal after the battle of the Donbas and a few months later Ukrainian forces counterattacks in an offensive known as the Kharkiv counteroffensive which kicked russian forces out of the area north of the canal and Slovyansk then months later Russian forces took Bakhmut in May of 2023 which caused the parts of the canel near Zelenopillia and Kurdiumivka to come under Russian control until the Ukrainian counteroffensive of 2023 which took back that part of the canal which stayed under Ukrainian control even after parts of the canal was occupied in the battles of Chasiv Yar and Toretsk and the final offensive that got the canal occupied was the one with the Battle of Siversk.

== Characteristics ==
The total length of the canal is 133.4 kilometres (82.9 mi), where 107 kilometres (66 mi) consist of conventional canals, and another 26.4 kilometres (16.4 mi) are pipe bridges. There are four pump stations to carry water over higher elevations, and five reservoirs to ensure smooth operations.

== See also ==
- Dnipro – Donbas Canal
- North Crimean Canal
