= Red Army tactics in World War II =

Development of Red Army tactics began during the Russian Civil War, and are still a subject of study within Russian military academies today. They were an important source of development in military theory, and in particular of armoured warfare before, during and after the Second World War, in the process influencing the outcome of World War II and the Korean War.

== Beginnings ==
The Red Army's tactical doctrine was shaped by the Russian experience of the First World War, and in particular the Brusilov Offensive. Theoretical writings on tactical doctrine in the late 1920s reflect Soviet awareness that motor transport and armoured vehicles would potentially change the conduct of warfare. Many of the popular Russian Civil War leaders were cavalry officers, which strengthened support for the notion that development of Soviet tactical doctrine should emphasize maneuver and mobility, as was the case in other European armies which were perceived as a future threat to the spread of the Socialist and Communist ideals, such as America and the rest of the capitalist world.

In the late 1920s the Soviet Union's Military Commissariat, in addition to establishing a regular armed force known as the Workers' and Peasants' Red Army, established several directorates responsible for development of doctrines of the various combat arms and combat service support arms. Part of the effort included purchasing equipment from overseas to gain understanding of recent developments, including armoured vehicles from France and Britain as well as several chassis from an American designer that later became the basis of a family of Soviet produced tanks.

== Theoretical development ==
The basic tactical principles of the Red Army remained those used during World War I, primarily trench warfare, until the emergence of theoreticians such as Uborevich, Tukhachevsky and Triandafillov who transformed the tactical, operational and strategic conduct of war in Soviet military philosophy.

The core premise of the new thinking became a maintenance of the offensive, increase of tempo in the conduct of combat, use of overwhelming firepower, and penetration in depth of enemy territory. The Brusilov operation was regarded as the most successful conducted by the Russian Army during World War I, and recognition of the ultimate failure to reach its objectives was related to several inherent failings of the Russian Army such as lack of armoured vehicles to provide close support to assaulting infantry, interaction with the air units, and above all good small unit leadership.

While developing their theoretic work, the Soviet military command invited German officers to participate in, and contribute to exercises held in the then Belorussian Special Military District.

== Development and application before World War II ==
The doctrine, described in Triandafillov's work The Character of the Operations of Modern Armies, and later formally in the PU-36 (1936 Field Service Regulations) authored by Tukhachevskii in the early 1930s, spelled out the tactical and operational doctrines and led to a complete reorganisation of the Red Army to include large numbers of motor transport and armoured vehicles. The infantry would now work with heavy artillery to break through the enemy's possibly fortified forward positions, thus allowing the mobile troops to exploit the breach to penetrate enemy's defensive positions and destroy rear support and service units and ultimately lines of communications. Infantry units received substantial increase in the number of automatic weapons and supporting artillery, and there was a concerted effort to improve leadership qualities of the officer corps, including teaching and encouraging use of initiative. The many cavalry formations that still existed in the Red Army changed their tactics from the usual cavalry role to that of mobile mounted infantry to support the tanks, but less reliant on fuel and support, thereby reducing the logistic tail of the operational formation. Significant attention was paid to development of close air support (CAS) although there was a serious impediment in the industrial capability to provide enough radios to the military units.

Stalin severely undermined the improvements made when he instituted the Great Purge of 1936–38, which resulted in the loss of a significant portion of trained officers from the army, including Tukhachevsky. Many of the remaining officers lacked the experience and training necessary to carry out the doctrine of deep battle. Other survivors became fearful of displaying initiative contravening direct Stavka orders. Further complicating the problem was that many of the personnel needed to train new officers were themselves also purged.

Nevertheless, the new regulations were used during the Soviet-Japanese clashes on the eastern China–Russia border with overwhelming success. The theory had been applied against the conventional Japanese infantry tactics and was proven to work.

== Poland 1939 ==
When World War 2 began with the German invasion of Poland, Stalin instituted a rapid forced expansion of the Red Army, which resulted in even more poorly trained and inexperienced officers being placed in commanding positions they were not ready for.

== The Winter War ==
The Great Purges had a significant impact on Soviet ability to set and achieve operational objectives during the war in Finland. Shortfalls in terrain analysis, intelligence on Finnish disposition, equipment, and personnel plagued early Soviet attempts at deep battle. By December 1939 Soviet advances began to stall out and despite initial success with doctrinal mass and penetration across a broad front. A lack of dedicated mechanized exploitation forces allowed the Finnish army to stem and repel Soviet advances with counterattacks on Soviet flanks. Tactically, the Soviets lacked cohesive combined arms maneuver and tanks were regularly committed without infantry support. Soviet success was achieved ultimately through a strategy of attrition, using a significantly larger resource base to wear away at the Finnish army.

== Barbarossa ==
By the time of the German invasion in June 1941 the Red Army was roughly twice the size it had been in September 1939, but was sorely unprepared for war. The doctrine of Deep Battle was still the official line, but few of the soldiers were trained or prepared to utilize it correctly.

== See also ==
- Russian military deception
- Soviet deep battle

== Sources and further reading ==
- Gordon L. Rottman 2005: World War II Infantry Anti-Tank Tactics, ISBN 1-84176-842-1
- David Goldovt-Ryzhenkov (Translator) 2014: Handbook for the Commander and Soldier of the Machine Gun Squad, 1941 Translated Manuals
- Sally W. Stoecker 1998: Forging Stalin's Army. Marshal Tuklzaclevsky and the Politics of Military Innovation, ISBN 0-8133-3735-6
- James D. Morrow 1993: Arms Versus Allies: Trade-Offs in the Search for Security, published in International Organization, vol. 47, no. 2 (spring 1993), pages 207–233
- Tim Ripley 2004: The Waffen-SS at War: Hitler's Praetorians 1925–1945, ISBN 0-7603-2068-3
- Robert Kirchubel 2003: Operation Barbarossa 1941 ISBN 1-84176-697-6
- Rottman, Gordon (2008). World War II Infantry Assault Tactics. Osprey Publishing. ISBN 978-1-84603-191-5.
