= Kalynivka, Bakhmut Raion, Donetsk Oblast =

Kalynivka Калинівка
- Rural settlement
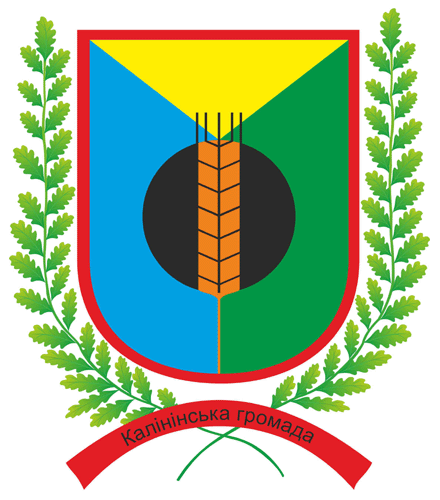
- Flag Coat of arms
- Interactive map of Kalynivka
- Location within Donetsk Oblast Location within Ukraine
- Coordinates: 48°36′41″N 37°51′44″E
- Country: Ukraine
- Oblast: Donetsk Oblast
- Raion: Bakhmut Raion
- Hromada: Chasiv Yar urban hromada

Area
  - Total: 1.378 km^{2} (0.532 sq mi)
- Elevation: 219 m (719 ft)

Population (2014)
  - Total: 542
  - Density: 393.3/km^{2} (1,019/sq mi)
- Postal code: 84550
- Area code: +380-6274

Kalynivka (Ukrainian: Калинівка), is a rural settlement located in Bakhmut Raion of Donetsk Oblast, Ukraine. It is located west of Bakhmut. Until 2016, the settlement was called Kalinina (Ukrainian: Калініна).

== History ==
=== Russo-Ukrainian War ===
During the Russian invasion of Ukraine, the settlement suffered extensive damage from Russian shelling and shrunk to a population of approximately two dozen.

On July 17, 2024, Russian forces captured the part of the village east of the Siverskyi Donets – Donbas Canal.

== See also ==
- List of villages in Donetsk Oblast
