= Birinci Meyniman =

- Municipality
- Location within Azerbaijan
- Coordinates: 40°02′35″N 48°45′30″E
- Country: Azerbaijan
- Rayon: Hajigabul

Population
  - Total: 1,408
- Time zone: UTC+4 (AZT)
  - Summer (DST): UTC+5 (AZT)

Birinci Meyniman (also, Meyniman Pervoye) is a village and municipality in the Hajigabul Rayon of Azerbaijan. It has a population of 1,408. The municipality consists of the villages of Birinci Meyniman and Meyniman.
