= Kamikaze drone =

Kamikaze drone may refer to:

- Loitering munition
- One-way attack drone
