= Kalinovka, Masally =

Kalinovka
- Municipality
- Location within Azerbaijan
- Coordinates: 39°00′37″N 48°46′27″E
- Country: Azerbaijan
- Rayon: Masally

Population
  - Total: 2,224
- Time zone: UTC+4 (AZT)
  - Summer (DST): UTC+5 (AZT)

Kalinovka is a village and municipality in the Masally Rayon of Azerbaijan. It has a population of 2,224.
