= Storm-V =

Russian penal military units

- Шторм-V
- Russian "V" marker that the unit is named after
- Active: June 24, 2023 – present
- Country: Russia
- Branch: Russian Armed Forces
- Type: Infantry
- Role: Penal military unit
- Nickname: "Vityazi" (Note: Russian for Knights)
- Engagements: Russian invasion of Ukraine: 2023 Ukrainian counteroffensive; Battle of Avdiivka; Battle of Chasiv Yar

Commanders
- Current commander: Unknown

Storm-V (Russian: Шторм-V, romanized: Shtorm-V) is a series of penal military units established by a law which was signed by Russian president Vladimir Putin which disbanded Storm-Z and replaced it with Storm-V. The V in Storm-V stands for "vityazi", the Russian word for ‘knights.’

== History ==
Storm-V was created on 24 June 2023. It was claimed that Storm-V units did not offer pardons or even parole and extend convicts' contracts indefinitely until the end of the war, unlike Storm-Z units where pardon was promised after a 6 months contract. The Storm-V was involved in the battle of Avdiivka and the Battle of Chasiv Yar.

According to BBC News Russian, Storm-V units are poorly trained like their predecessors in the Storm-Z units, with a member reporting that he and his unit was given just 12 days of training before being sent to the frontline. The same source reported that Storm-V soldiers are often sent on suicidal assaults, and those who refuse to carry out assaults are sent to so-called "punishment pits" or are executed. However, in comparison with Storm-Z units, Storm-V units are given full pay similar to the regular Russian military as well as benefits and allowances.

In October 2024, Finnish newspaper Helsingin Sanomat released an article about a Finnish-speaking Russian prisoner of war who was part of Storm-V. He was interviewed by a Finnish soldier in the Karelian Group "NORD" (as a part of the Russian Volunteer Corps) that captured him. When he was asked about how the Russian military treated him, he answered that they had been "abandoned like wet rags left to dry on our own", "all the wounded are laying around and dying" and that they "had probably eaten more sand here than regular food".
