= Meyniman (village) =

- Location within Azerbaijan
- Coordinates: 40°02′15″N 48°44′50″E
- Country: Azerbaijan
- Rayon: Hajigabul

Population (2014)
  - Total: 0
- Time zone: UTC+4 (AZT)
  - Summer (DST): UTC+5 (AZT)

Meyniman (known as Kalinovka until 1999) is a village in the municipality of Birinci Meyniman in the Hajigabul Rayon of Azerbaijan. In 2014, it was listed as an abandoned village.
