= Joe Biden =

President of the United States from 2021 to 2025

- Official portrait, 2021

46th President of the United States
- In office January 20, 2021 – January 20, 2025
- Vice President: Kamala Harris
- Preceded by: Donald Trump
- Succeeded by: Donald Trump

47th Vice President of the United States
- In office January 20, 2009 – January 20, 2017
- President: Barack Obama
- Preceded by: Dick Cheney
- Succeeded by: Mike Pence

United States Senator from Delaware
- In office January 5, 1973 – January 15, 2009
- Preceded by: J. Caleb Boggs
- Succeeded by: Ted Kaufman
Senate positions
Chair of the Senate Foreign Relations Committee
In office January 3, 2007 – January 3, 2009
Preceded by	Richard Lugar
Succeeded by	John Kerry
In office June 6, 2001 – January 3, 2003
Preceded by	Jesse Helms
Succeeded by	Richard Lugar
In office January 3, 2001 – January 20, 2001
Preceded by	Jesse Helms
Succeeded by	Jesse Helms
Ranking Member of the Senate Foreign Relations Committee
In office January 3, 2003 – January 3, 2007
Preceded by	Jesse Helms
Succeeded by	Richard Lugar
In office January 20, 2001 – June 6, 2001
Preceded by	Jesse Helms
Succeeded by	Jesse Helms
In office January 3, 1997 – January 3, 2001
Preceded by	Jesse Helms
Succeeded by	Jesse Helms
Chair of the International Narcotics Control Caucus
In office January 3, 2007 – January 3, 2009
Preceded by	Chuck Grassley
Succeeded by	Dianne Feinstein
Chair of the Senate Judiciary Committee
In office January 3, 1987 – January 3, 1995
Preceded by	Strom Thurmond
Succeeded by	Orrin Hatch
Ranking Member of the Senate Judiciary Committee
In office January 3, 1995 – January 3, 1997
Preceded by	Orrin Hatch
Succeeded by	Patrick Leahy
In office January 3, 1981 – January 3, 1987
Preceded by	Strom Thurmond
Succeeded by	Strom Thurmond

Member of the New Castle County Council from the 4th district
- In office January 5, 1971 – January 1, 1973
- Preceded by: Lawrence T. Messick
- Succeeded by: Francis Swift

Personal details
- Born: Joseph Robinette Biden Jr. November 20, 1942 (age 84) Scranton, Pennsylvania, U.S.
- Party: Democratic
- Spouses: Neilia Hunter (m. 1966; died 1972) Jill Jacobs (m. 1977)
- Children: 4, including Beau, Hunter, and Ashley
- Relatives: Biden family
- Education: University of Delaware (BA); Syracuse University (JD)
- Awards: Full list
- Website: Official website; Presidential library; White House archives
- Biden's voice Biden speaking on the U.S. withdrawal from Afghanistan and the fall of Kabul; Recorded August 16, 2021

Joseph Robinette Biden Jr. (Note: Pronounced /ˈbaɪdən/ BY-dən) (born November 20, 1942) is an American retired politician who was the 46th president of the United States from 2021 to 2025. A member of the Democratic Party, he represented Delaware in the United States Senate from 1973 to 2009 and also served as the 47th vice president under President Barack Obama from 2009 to 2017.

Born in Scranton, Pennsylvania, Biden graduated from the University of Delaware in 1965 and the Syracuse University College of Law in 1968. He was elected to the New Castle County Council in 1970 and the U.S. Senate in 1972. As a senator, Biden chaired the Senate Judiciary Committee and Foreign Relations Committee. He drafted and led passage of the Violent Crime Control and Law Enforcement Act and the Violence Against Women Act. Biden oversaw six U.S. Supreme Court confirmation hearings, including contentious hearings for Robert Bork and Clarence Thomas. He opposed the Gulf War in 1991 but voted in favor of the Iraq War Resolution in 2002. Biden ran unsuccessfully for the Democratic presidential nomination in the 1988 and 2008 primaries. In 2008, Obama chose him as his running mate, and he served as a close advisor to Obama while vice president. In the 2020 presidential election, Biden chose Kamala Harris as his running mate, and they defeated Republican incumbents Donald Trump and Mike Pence.

As president, Biden signed the American Rescue Plan Act in response to the COVID-19 pandemic and subsequent recession. He signed bipartisan bills on infrastructure and manufacturing. Biden proposed the Build Back Better Act, part of which was incorporated into the Inflation Reduction Act passed in 2022. He appointed Ketanji Brown Jackson to the Supreme Court. In his foreign policy, the U.S. reentered the Paris Agreement. Biden withdrew U.S. troops from Afghanistan, which ended the war in Afghanistan, and the Taliban swiftly retook control. He responded to the Russian invasion of Ukraine by imposing sanctions on Russia and authorizing humanitarian and military aid to Ukraine. In 2022, Biden supported Finland's and Sweden's bids to join NATO. During the Gaza war, he condemned the actions of Hamas, gave Israel strong military and diplomatic support, sent humanitarian aid to the Gaza Strip, and backed a temporary ceasefire proposal before his presidency ended.

Concerns about Biden's age and health persisted throughout his presidency. He is the first president to turn 80 years old while in office. Biden initially ran for reelection in 2024, winning the Democratic primaries and becoming the party's presumptive nominee. After his performance in the first presidential debate, intensifying scrutiny from both political parties about his age and health led him to withdraw his candidacy. Biden entered office with majority support, but his approval ratings declined significantly during his presidency, particularly over concerns about inflation and immigration. He is the oldest living former U.S. president since the second inauguration of Donald Trump in 2025, the oldest living former U.S. vice president since Dick Cheney died in 2025, and the oldest person to have served as president.

== Early life and education ==
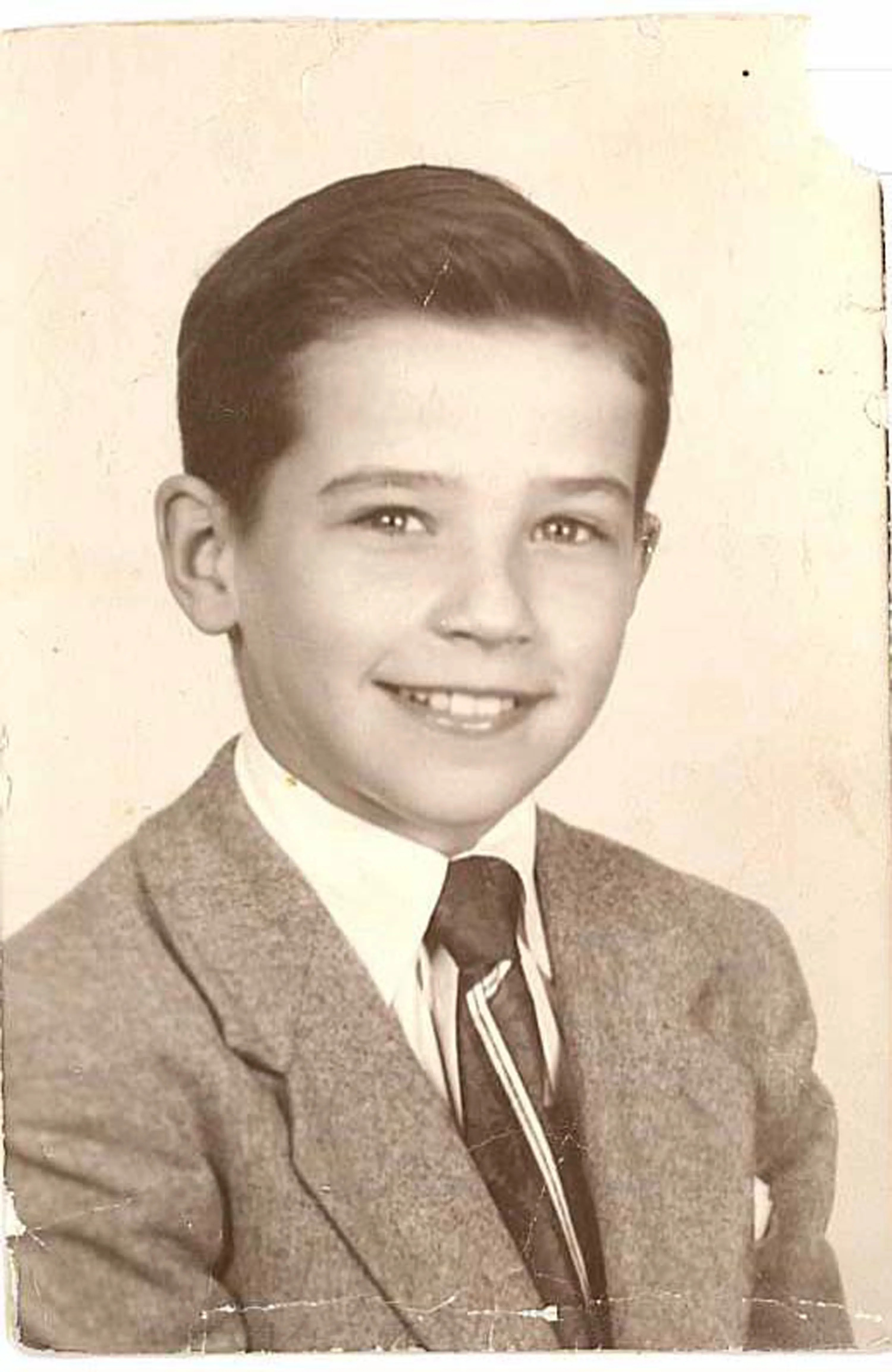
Biden in 1952; at age 10

Joseph Robinette Biden Jr. was born on November 20, 1942, at St. Mary's Hospital in Scranton, Pennsylvania, to Catherine Eugenia "Jean" Biden (née Finnegan) and Joseph Robinette Biden Sr. He is the oldest child in a Catholic family of predominantly Irish descent. Biden has a sister, Valerie, and two brothers, James and Francis.

Joseph Sr. had been wealthy, and the family purchased a home in the affluent Long Island suburb of Garden City, New York, in 1946. After he suffered business setbacks around the time Biden was seven years old, the family lived with Jean's parents in Scranton for several years. Scranton fell into economic decline during the 1950s, and Joseph Sr. could not find steady work. Beginning in 1953, when Biden was ten, the family lived in an apartment in Claymont, Delaware, before moving to a house in nearby Mayfield, Delaware. (Note: Attributed to multiple sources:) Joseph Sr. later became a successful used-car salesman, maintaining the family in a middle-class lifestyle. Growing up, Biden observed alcoholism in his family, deciding at a young age to be teetotal.

At Archmere Academy in Claymont, Biden played baseball and was a standout halfback and wide receiver on the high school football team. Though a poor student, he was class president in his junior and senior years. He graduated in 1961. At the University of Delaware in Newark, Biden briefly played freshman football and received a Bachelor of Arts degree with a double major in history and political science in 1965. To overcome a childhood stutter, he memorized lines from Ralph Waldo Emerson and W. B. Yeats.

== Law school and early career (1966–1973) ==
Biden earned a Juris Doctor from Syracuse University College of Law in 1968. In his first year of law school, he failed a course because he plagiarized a law review article, but the failing grade was later stricken. His grades were relatively poor, and he graduated 76th in a class of 85. He was admitted to the Delaware bar in 1969.

Biden clerked at a law firm headed by prominent local Republican William Prickett in 1968 and self-identified as a Republican. He disliked incumbent Democratic Delaware governor Charles L. Terry Jr.'s conservative racial politics and supported a more liberal Republican, Russell W. Peterson, who defeated Terry in 1968. Local Republicans attempted to recruit Biden, but he registered as an independent because of his distaste for Republican presidential candidate Richard Nixon.

=== Law practices ===
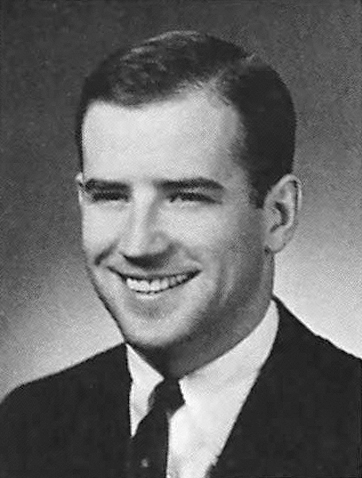
Biden pictured by Syracuse University in 1968

In 1969, Biden resumed practicing law, first as a public defender in Wilmington, Delaware. Most of his clients were African Americans from Wilmington's east side. Biden then joined a firm headed by Sid Balick, a locally active Democrat. Balick named him to the Democratic Forum, a group trying to reform and revitalize the state party, and Biden switched his registration to Democratic. He also started his own firm, Biden and Walsh. Corporate law, however, did not appeal to him, and criminal law did not pay well. He supplemented his income by managing properties.

Biden ran for the fourth district seat on the New Castle County Council in 1970 on a liberal platform that included support for public housing in the suburbs. Biden won the general election, defeating Republican Lawrence T. Messick, and took office on January 5, 1971. He served until January 1, 1973. During his time on the county council, Biden opposed large highway projects, which he argued might disrupt Wilmington neighborhoods.

Biden had not openly supported or opposed the Vietnam War until he ran for Senate and opposed Richard Nixon's conduct of the war. While studying at the University of Delaware and Syracuse University, Biden obtained five student draft deferments. Based on a physical examination, he was given a conditional medical deferment in 1968; in 2008, a spokesperson for Biden said his having had "asthma as a teenager" was the reason.

=== 1972 U.S. Senate campaign in Delaware ===
Biden defeated Republican incumbent J. Caleb Boggs to become the junior U.S. senator from Delaware in 1972. He was the only Democrat willing to challenge Boggs and, with minimal campaign funds, was thought to have no chance of winning. Family members managed and staffed the campaign, which relied on meeting voters face-to-face and hand-distributing position papers, an approach made feasible by Delaware's small size. He received help from the AFL-CIO and Democratic pollster Patrick Caddell. His platform focused on the environment, withdrawal from Vietnam, civil rights, mass transit, equitable taxation, health care and public dissatisfaction with "politics as usual". A few months before the election, Biden trailed Boggs by almost thirty percentage points, but his energy, young family, and ability to connect with voters' emotions worked to his advantage, and he won with 50.5% of the vote.

=== Teaching ===
From 1991 to 2008, as an adjunct professor, Biden co-taught a seminar on constitutional law at Widener University School of Law.

== U.S. Senate (1973–2009) ==
Elected to the U.S. Senate in 1972, Biden was reelected in 1978, 1984, 1990, 1996, 2002, and 2008, regularly receiving about 60% of the vote. Aged 30 when first elected, he was the seventh-youngest senator in U.S. history. He was junior senator to William Roth until Roth was defeated in 2000. He remains one of the longest-serving senators in U.S. history. For 36 years, he commuted from Washington to Wilmington via Amtrak, earning him the nickname "Amtrak Joe".

=== Senate activities ===
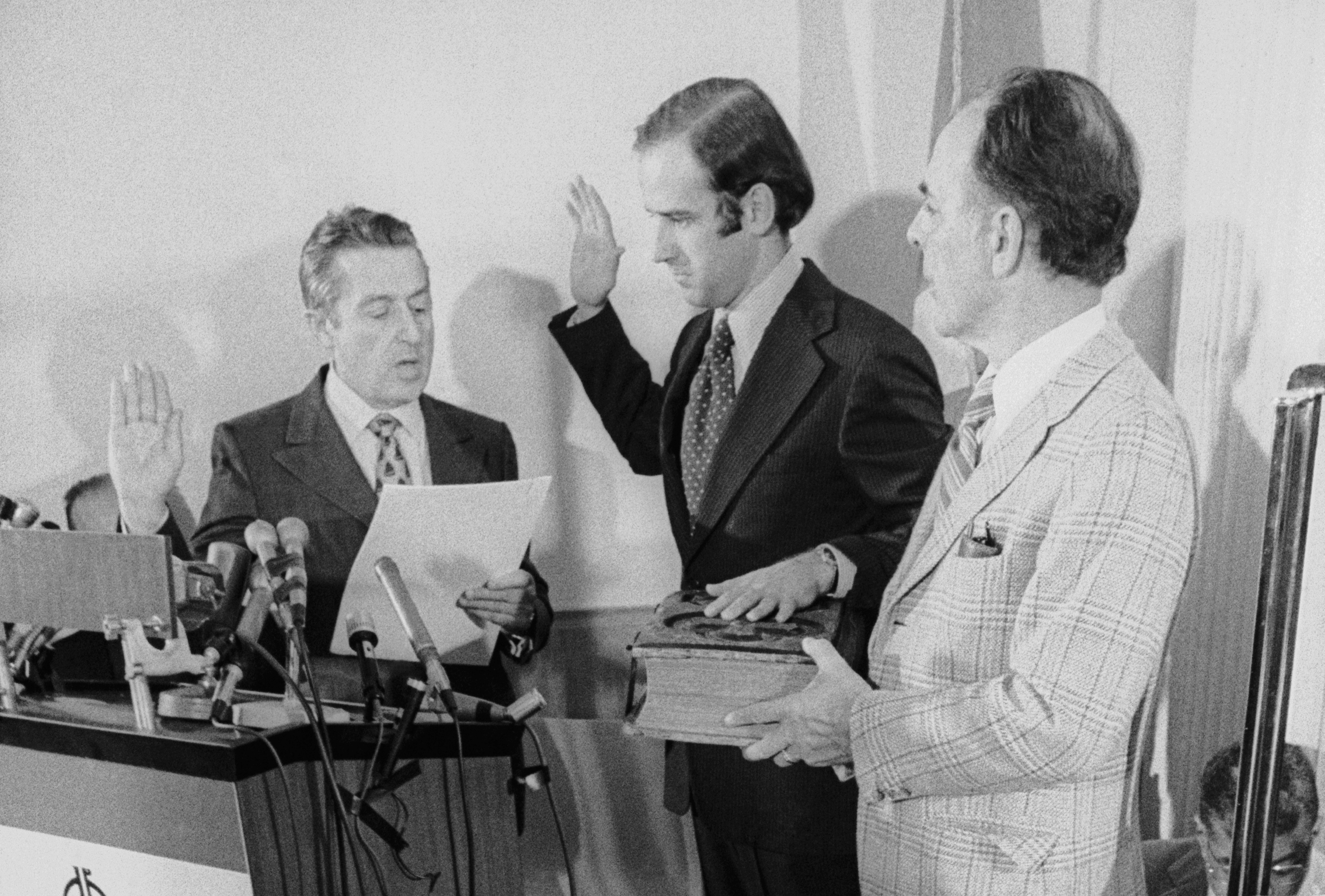
Secretary of the Senate Francis R. Valeo swearing in Biden into the Senate on January 5, 1973

During his early years in the Senate, Biden focused on consumer protection and environmental issues and called for greater government accountability. In 1974, he described himself as liberal on civil rights and liberties, senior citizens' concerns, and healthcare, but conservative on other issues, including abortion and military conscription. Biden was the first U.S. senator to endorse Governor Jimmy Carter for president in the 1976 Democratic primary. Carter won the Democratic nomination and the 1976 election. Biden also worked on arms control. After Congress failed to ratify the SALT II Treaty signed in 1979 by Soviet general secretary Leonid Brezhnev and President Carter, Biden met with Soviet foreign minister Andrei Gromyko and secured changes that addressed the Senate Foreign Relations Committee's objections. He received considerable attention when he excoriated Secretary of State George Shultz at a Senate hearing for the Reagan administration's support of South Africa despite its policy of apartheid. In a congressional hearing in 1984, he objected to the Strategic Defense Initiative plan to construct autonomous systems of ICBM defense. Biden was an advocate for Delaware military installations, including Dover Air Force Base and New Castle Air National Guard Base.

In the mid-1970s, Biden was one of the Senate's strongest opponents of race-integration busing. His Delaware constituents strongly opposed it, and such opposition nationwide later led his party to mostly abandon school integration policies. In his first Senate campaign, Biden had expressed support for busing to remedy de jure segregation, as in the South, but opposed its use to remedy de facto segregation arising from racial patterns of neighborhood residency, as in Delaware; he opposed a proposed constitutional amendment banning busing entirely. Biden supported a 1976 measure forbidding the use of federal funds for transporting students beyond the school closest to them. He co-sponsored a 1977 amendment closing loopholes in that measure, which President Carter signed into law in 1978.

Biden became ranking minority member of the Senate Judiciary Committee in 1981. He was a Democratic floor manager for the successful passage of the Comprehensive Crime Control Act in 1984. His supporters praised him for modifying some of the law's worst provisions, and it was his most important legislative accomplishment to that time. In 1994, Biden helped pass the Violent Crime Control and Law Enforcement Act, which included a ban on assault weapons, and the Violence Against Women Act, which he has called his most significant legislation. The 1994 crime law was unpopular among progressives and criticized for resulting in mass incarceration; Biden later expressed regret for passing the bill.

Biden voted for a 1993 provision that deemed homosexuality incompatible with military life, thereby banning gay people from serving in the armed forces. In 1996, he voted for the Defense of Marriage Act, which prohibited the federal government from recognizing same-sex marriages, thereby barring people in such marriages from equal protection under federal law and allowing states to do the same. In 2015, the act was ruled unconstitutional in Obergefell v. Hodges.

Biden was critical of Independent Counsel Ken Starr during the 1990s Whitewater controversy and Clinton–Lewinsky scandal investigations, saying "it's going to be a cold day in hell" before another independent counsel would be granted similar powers. He voted to acquit during the impeachment of Bill Clinton. During the 2000s, Biden sponsored bankruptcy legislation sought by credit card issuers (such as MBNA, one of Delaware's largest companies). Bill Clinton vetoed the bill in 2000, but it passed in 2005 as the Bankruptcy Abuse Prevention and Consumer Protection Act, with Biden being one of only 18 Democrats to vote for it, while leading Democrats and consumer rights organizations opposed it. As a senator, Biden strongly supported increased Amtrak funding and rail security.

=== 1988 presidential campaign ===
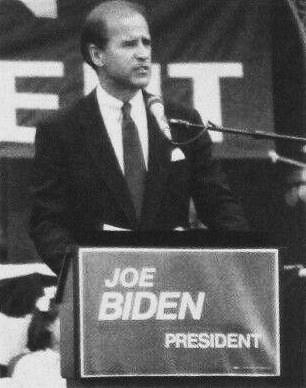
Biden speaks at a campaign event in 1987.

Biden declared his candidacy for the 1988 Democratic presidential nomination on June 9, 1987. He was considered a strong candidate because of his moderate image, his speaking ability, his high profile as chair of the Senate Judiciary Committee at the upcoming Robert Bork Supreme Court nomination hearings, and his appeal to Baby Boomers. He raised more in the first quarter of 1987 than any other candidate.

By August, Biden's campaign messaging had become confused due to staff rivalries, and in September, he was accused of plagiarizing a speech by British Labour Party leader Neil Kinnock. Biden had credited Kinnock on previous occasions, but did not on two occasions in August. Earlier that year, Biden had also used passages from a speech by Robert F. Kennedy (for which his aides took blame) and the inaugural address of John F. Kennedy. Two years earlier he had used a 1976 passage by Hubert Humphrey. Biden responded that politicians often borrow from one another without giving credit, and that one of his rivals for the nomination, Jesse Jackson, had called him to point out that Jackson had used the same material by Humphrey that Biden had used. A few days later, it was publicized that, while in law school, Biden had taken text from a Fordham Law Review article with inadequate citations. At Biden's request the Delaware Supreme Court's Board of Professional Responsibility reviewed the incident and concluded that he had violated no rules.

Biden made several false or exaggerated claims about his early life: that he had earned three degrees in college, that he attended law school on a full scholarship, that he had graduated in the top half of his class, and that he had marched in the civil rights movement. The limited amount of other news about the presidential race amplified these disclosures, and on September 23, 1987, Biden withdrew his candidacy.

=== Brain surgeries ===
In February 1988, after several episodes of severe neck pain, Biden underwent surgery to correct a leaking intracranial berry aneurysm. While recuperating, he suffered a pulmonary embolism. A second aneurysm was surgically repaired in May. His recuperation kept him away from the Senate for seven months.

=== Senate Judiciary Committee ===
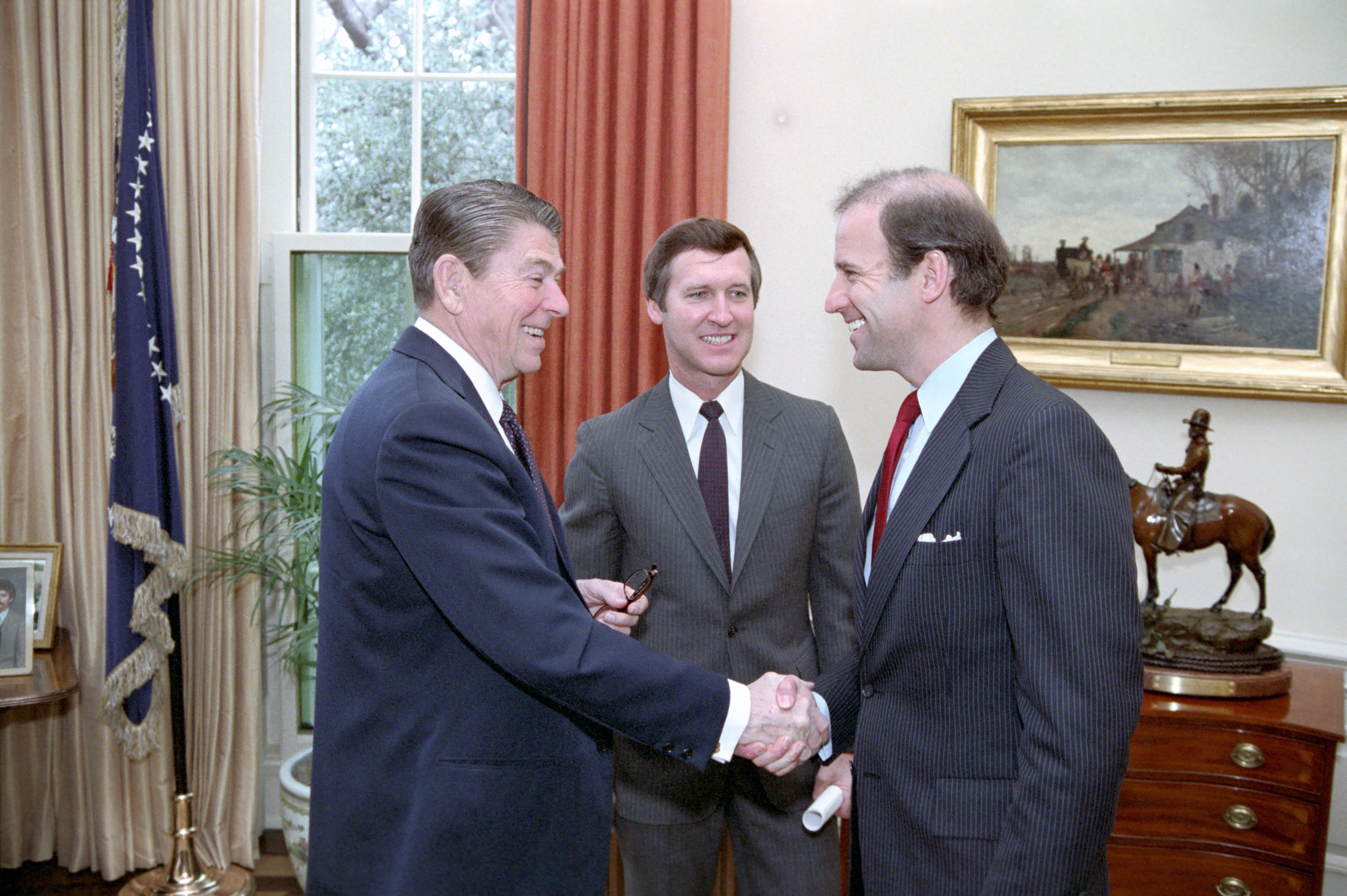
Biden shaking hands with President Ronald Reagan in 1984

Biden was a longtime member of the Senate Committee on the Judiciary. He chaired it from 1987 to 1995 and was a ranking minority member from 1981 to 1987 and again from 1995 to 1997.

As chair, Biden presided over two highly contentious U.S. Supreme Court confirmation hearings. When Robert Bork was nominated in 1988, Biden reversed his approval‍—‌given in an interview the previous year‍—‌of a hypothetical Bork nomination. Conservatives were angered, but at the hearings' close Biden was praised for his fairness, humor, and courage. Rejecting the arguments of some Bork opponents, Biden framed his objections to Bork in terms of the conflict between Bork's strong originalism and the view that the U.S. Constitution provides rights to liberty and privacy beyond those explicitly enumerated in its text. Bork's nomination was rejected in the committee by a 5–9 vote and then in the full Senate, 42–58.

During Clarence Thomas's nomination hearings in 1991, Biden's questions on constitutional issues were often convoluted to the point that Thomas sometimes lost track of them, and Thomas later wrote that Biden's questions were akin to "beanballs". After the committee hearing closed, the public learned that Anita Hill had accused Thomas of making unwelcome sexual comments when they had worked together. Biden had known of some of these charges, but initially shared them only with the committee because Hill was then unwilling to testify. The committee hearing was reopened and Hill testified, but Biden did not permit testimony from other witnesses, such as a woman who had made similar charges and experts on harassment. The full Senate confirmed Thomas by a 52–48 vote, with Biden opposed. Liberal legal advocates and women's groups felt strongly that Biden had mishandled the hearings and not done enough to support Hill. In 2019, he told Hill he regretted his treatment of her, but Hill said afterward she remained unsatisfied.

=== Senate Foreign Relations Committee ===
Biden was a longtime member of the Senate Foreign Relations Committee. He became its ranking minority member in 1997, and chaired it from June 2001 to 2003 and 2007 to 2009. His positions were generally liberal internationalist. He collaborated effectively with Republicans and sometimes went against elements of his own party. During this time he met with at least 150 leaders from 60 countries and international organizations, becoming a well-known Democratic voice on foreign policy.

Biden voted against authorization for the Gulf War in 1991. He became interested in the Yugoslav Wars after hearing about Serbian abuses during the Croatian War of Independence in 1991. Once the Bosnian War broke out, Biden was among the first to call for the "lift and strike" policy. George H. W. Bush and Bill Clinton were both reluctant to implement the policy, fearing Balkan entanglement. In April 1993, Biden had a tense three-hour meeting with Serbian leader Slobodan Milošević. Biden worked on several versions of legislative language urging the U.S. toward greater involvement. He has called his role in affecting Balkan policy in the mid-1990s his "proudest moment in public life" related to foreign policy. In 1999, during the Kosovo War, Biden supported the NATO bombing of Yugoslavia. He and Senator John McCain co-sponsored the McCain-Biden Kosovo Resolution, which called on Clinton to use all necessary force, including ground troops, to confront Milošević over Yugoslav actions toward Kosovo Albanians.

==== Wars in Afghanistan and Iraq ====
Biden was a strong supporter of the War in Afghanistan, saying, "Whatever it takes, we should do it." As head of the Senate Foreign Relations Committee, he said in 2002 that Iraqi president Saddam Hussein was a threat to national security and there was no other option than to "eliminate" that threat. In October 2002, he voted in favor of the Authorization for Use of Military Force Against Iraq, approving the U.S. invasion of Iraq. As chair of the committee, he assembled witnesses to testify in favor of the authorization. They gave testimony grossly misrepresenting the intent, history, and status of Saddam and his government, and touted Iraq's fictional possession of weapons of mass destruction. Biden eventually became a critic of the war, calling his vote a "mistake" by 2005, but did not push for withdrawal. He supported the appropriations for the occupation, but argued that the war should be internationalized, that more soldiers were needed, and that the Bush administration should "level with the American people" about its cost and length.

By late 2006, Biden's stance had shifted considerably. He opposed the troop surge of 2007, saying General David Petraeus was "dead, flat wrong" in believing the surge could work. Biden, through a plan developed with Council on Foreign Relations president Leslie H. Gelb, instead advocated dividing Iraq into a loose federation of three ethnic states. (Note: Attributed to multiple sources:) In September 2007, a non-binding resolution endorsing the plan passed the Senate, but the idea failed to gain traction.

== 2008 campaigns ==
=== Presidential ===
After exploring running in several previous cycles, in January 2007, Biden declared his candidacy in the 2008 elections. Biden focused on the Iraq War, his record as chairman of major Senate committees, and his foreign-policy experience. Biden was noted for his one-liners during the campaign; in one debate he said of Republican candidate Rudy Giuliani, "There's only three things he mentions in a sentence: a noun, and a verb and 9/11."

Biden had difficulty raising funds, struggled to draw people to his rallies, and failed to gain traction against the high-profile candidacies of Barack Obama and Hillary Clinton. He never rose above single digits in national polls of the Democratic candidates. In the first contest on January 3, 2008, Biden placed fifth in the Iowa caucuses, garnering slightly less than one percent of the state delegates. He withdrew from the race that evening.

Despite its lack of success, Biden's 2008 campaign raised his stature in the political world. In particular, it changed the relationship between Biden and Obama. Although they had served together on the Senate Foreign Relations Committee, they had not been close: Biden resented Obama's quick rise to political stardom, while Obama viewed Biden as garrulous and patronizing. Having gotten to know each other during 2007, Obama appreciated Biden's campaign style and appeal to working-class voters, and Biden said he became convinced Obama was "the real deal".

=== Vice-presidential ===
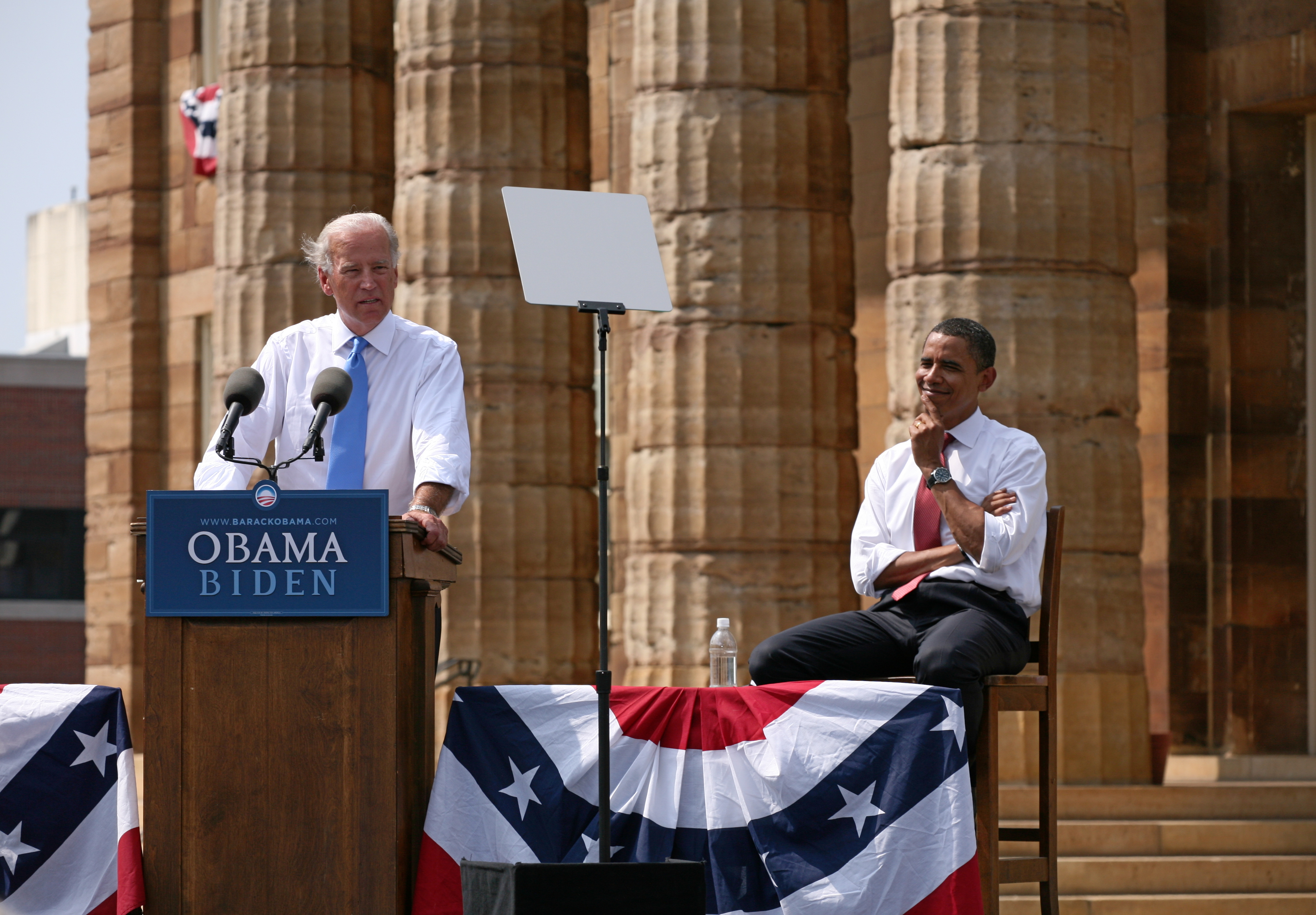
Biden speaks at his vice presidential announcement at the Old State Capitol in Springfield, Illinois, on August 23, 2008.

In August 2008, Obama and Biden met in secret to discuss the possibility of a place for Biden in the Obama administration, and developed a strong personal rapport. On August 22, Obama announced that Biden would be his running mate. The New York Times reported that the choice reflected a desire for someone with foreign policy and national security experience. Others pointed out Biden's appeal to middle-class and blue-collar voters. Biden was officially nominated for vice president on August 27 at the 2008 Democratic National Convention in Denver.

Biden's vice-presidential campaigning gained little media attention, as the press devoted far more coverage to the Republican nominee and then-governor of Alaska, Sarah Palin. Under instructions from the campaign, Biden kept his speeches succinct and tried to avoid offhand remarks. Privately, Biden's remarks frustrated Obama. "How many times is Biden gonna say something stupid?", he once angrily asked. Obama campaign staffers called Biden's blunders "Joe bombs" and kept Biden uninformed about strategy discussions, which irked Biden. Relations between the two campaigns became strained for a month, until Biden apologized to Obama and the two built a stronger partnership.

As the 2008 financial crisis reached a peak in September 2008, and the proposed Emergency Economic Stabilization Act of 2008 became a major factor in the campaign, Biden voted for the $700 billion Emergency Economic Stabilization Act of 2008, which passed in the Senate. On October 2, he participated in the vice-presidential debate with Palin at Washington University in St. Louis. Post-debate polls found that while Palin exceeded many voters' expectations, Biden had still won the debate overall. On November 4, Obama and Biden were elected.

As Biden was running for vice president, he was also running for reelection to the Senate, as permitted by Delaware law. Having been reelected to the Senate as well as the vice presidency, Biden made a point of not resigning from the Senate before he was sworn in for his seventh term in January 2009. He resigned from the Senate on January 15.

== Vice presidency (2009–2017) ==
=== First term (2009–2013) ===
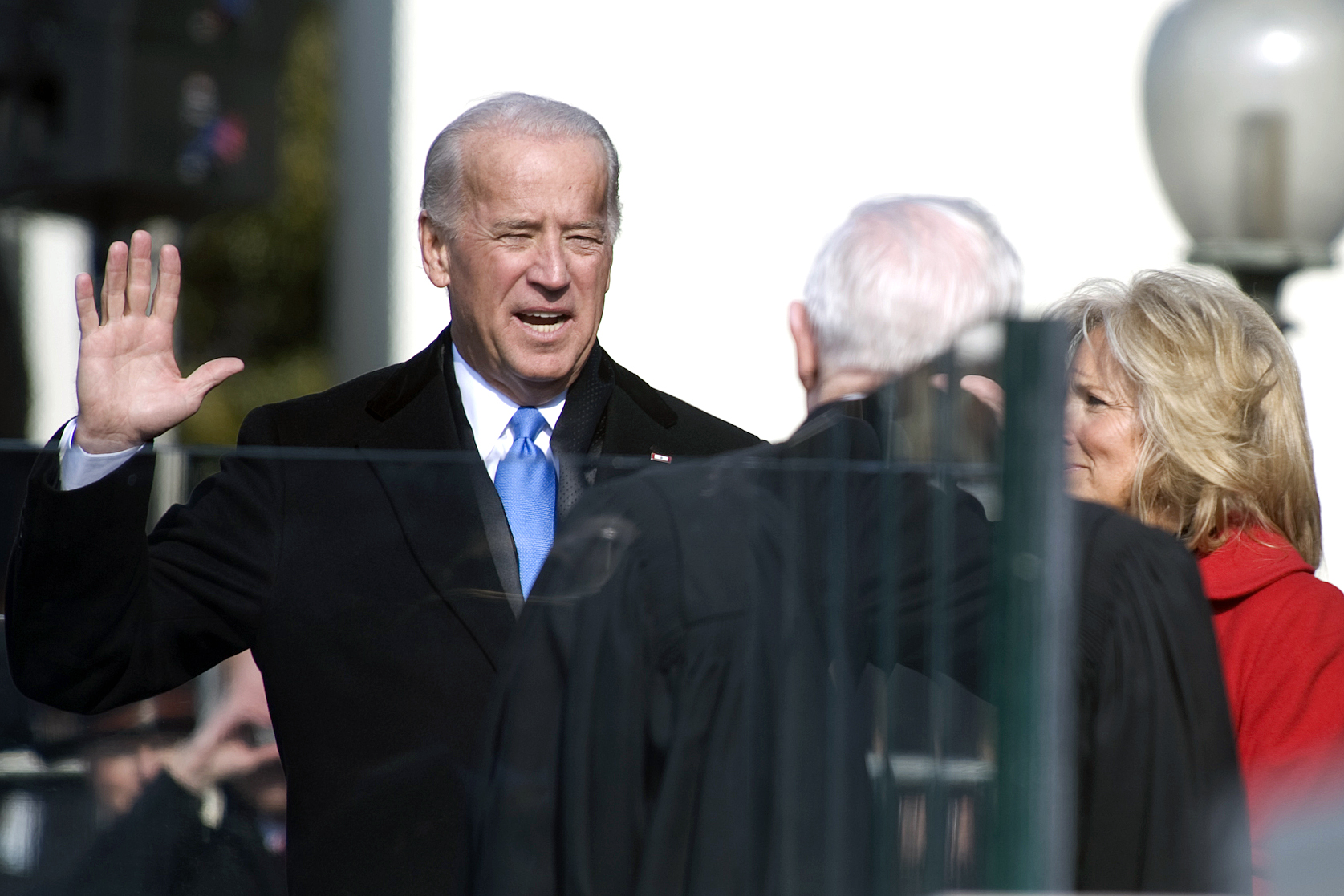
Biden being sworn in as vice president by Supreme Court Justice John Paul Stevens on January 20, 2009

Biden said he intended to eliminate some explicit roles assumed by George W. Bush's vice president, Dick Cheney, and did not intend to emulate any previous vice presidency. He was sworn in on January 20, 2009. He was the first vice president from Delaware and the first Roman Catholic vice president. Members of the Obama administration said Biden's role in the White House was to be a contrarian and force others to defend their positions. White House chief of staff Rahm Emanuel said Biden helped counter groupthink. The Bidens maintained a relaxed atmosphere at their official residence in Washington, often entertaining their grandchildren, and regularly returned to their home in Delaware.

Biden oversaw infrastructure spending from the Obama stimulus package intended to help counteract the ongoing recession. Confronted with rising unemployment through July 2009, Biden acknowledged that the administration had "misread how bad the economy was", but maintained confidence the stimulus package would create many more jobs once the pace of expenditures picked up. When he completed that role in February 2011, he said the number of fraud incidents with stimulus monies had been less than one percent.

Biden's off-message response to a question in April 2009, during the beginning of the swine flu outbreak, led to a swift retraction by the White House. The remark revived Biden's reputation for gaffes. A hot mic picked up Biden telling Obama that his signing the Patient Protection and Affordable Care Act was "a big fucking deal" on March 23, 2010. Despite their different personalities, Obama and Biden formed a friendship, partly based around Obama's daughter Sasha and Biden's granddaughter Maisy, who attended Sidwell Friends School together.

Biden visited Kosovo in May 2009 and affirmed the U.S. position that its "independence is irreversible". He lost an internal debate to Secretary of State Hillary Clinton about sending 21,000 new troops to Afghanistan, but his skepticism was valued, and his views gained more influence as Obama reconsidered his Afghanistan strategy. Obama delegated Biden to oversee Iraq policy, and he became the administration's point man in delivering messages to Iraqi leadership before the exit of U.S. troops in 2011. (Note: Attributed to multiple sources:)

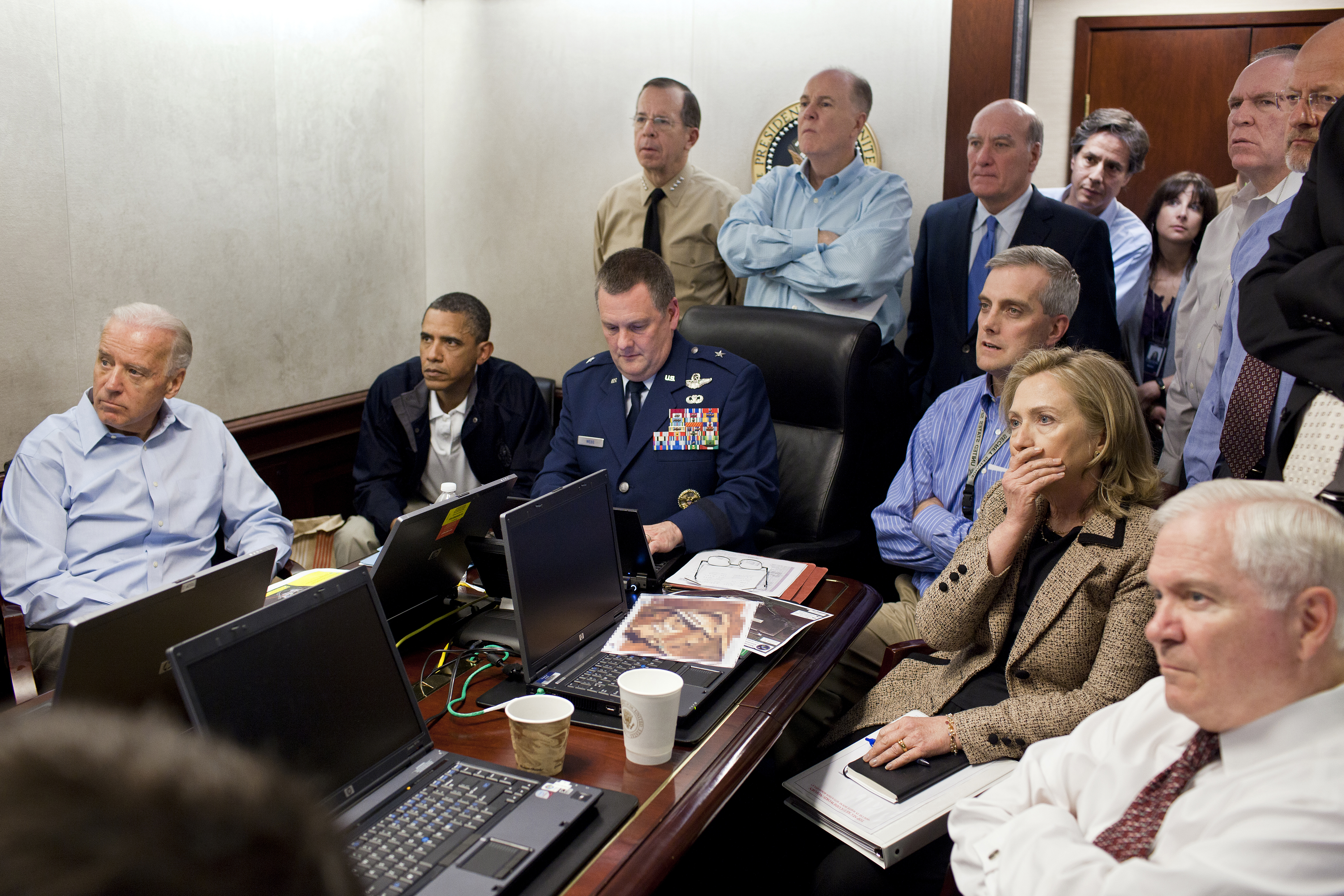
Biden, Obama and the national security team gathered in the White House Situation Room to monitor the progress of the May 2011 mission to kill Osama bin Laden.

Biden campaigned heavily for Democrats in the 2010 midterm elections, maintaining an attitude of optimism in the face of predictions of large-scale losses for the party. After big Republican gains in the elections and Emanuel's departure, Biden's past relationships with Republicans in Congress became more important. He led the successful administration effort to gain Senate approval for the New START treaty. In December 2010, Biden's advocacy for a middle ground, followed by his negotiations with Senate minority leader Mitch McConnell, were instrumental in producing the administration's compromise tax package that included a temporary extension of the Bush tax cuts. The package passed as the Tax Relief, Unemployment Insurance Reauthorization, and Job Creation Act of 2010.

Obama delegated Biden to lead negotiations with Congress during the 2011 U.S. debt ceiling crisis. Biden's relationship with McConnell brought about the Budget Control Act of 2011 that solved the crisis. Some reports suggest that Biden opposed proceeding with the May 2011 U.S. mission to kill Osama bin Laden, lest failure adversely affect Obama's reelection prospects. In 2012, Biden made the case for Obama's reelection: "Osama bin Laden is dead and General Motors is alive."

Obama named Biden to head the Gun Violence Task Force, created to address the causes of school shootings and consider possible gun control measures in the aftermath of the Sandy Hook Elementary School shooting, in December 2012. Later that month, during the final days before the United States fell off the "fiscal cliff", Biden's relationship with McConnell again proved important as the two negotiated a deal that led to the American Taxpayer Relief Act of 2012 being passed at the start of 2013.

=== 2012 campaign ===
In October 2010, Biden said Obama had asked him to remain as his running mate for the 2012 presidential election, but with Obama's popularity declining, White House Chief of Staff William M. Daley conducted some secret polling and focus group research in late 2011 on the idea of replacing Biden with Hillary Clinton. The notion was dropped when the results showed no appreciable improvement, and White House officials later said Obama himself never entertained the idea.

Biden's May 2012 statement that he was "absolutely comfortable" with same-sex marriage gained considerable public attention in comparison to Obama's position, which had been described as "evolving". Biden made his statement without administration consent, and Obama and his aides were irked, since Obama had planned to shift position in the build-up to the party convention. Gay rights advocates seized upon Biden's statement, and within days, Obama announced that he too supported same-sex marriage, an action in part forced by Biden's remarks.

Biden had a heavy schedule of appearances in swing states as the reelection campaign began in earnest in spring 2012. An August 2012 remark before a mixed-race audience that Republican proposals to relax Wall Street regulations would "put y'all back in chains" again drew attention to Biden's propensity for colorful remarks.

Following the first presidential debate of the general election, in which Obama's performance was considered surprisingly lackluster, his lead over Romney collapsed, putting pressure on Biden to stop the bleeding with a strong showing against the Republican vice-presidential nominee, Paul Ryan. Some political analysts considered Biden's performance in the October 11 vice-presidential debate one of the best of his career and a key factor in Obama's rebound in the polls and eventual victory. The debate also became memorable for the popularization of Biden's use of the phrase "a bunch of malarkey" in response to an attack by Ryan on the administration's response to the attacks on the U.S. embassy in Benghazi in September. Biden reused the phrase during his 2020 presidential campaign. On November 6, Obama and Biden were reelected.

=== Second term (2013–2017) ===
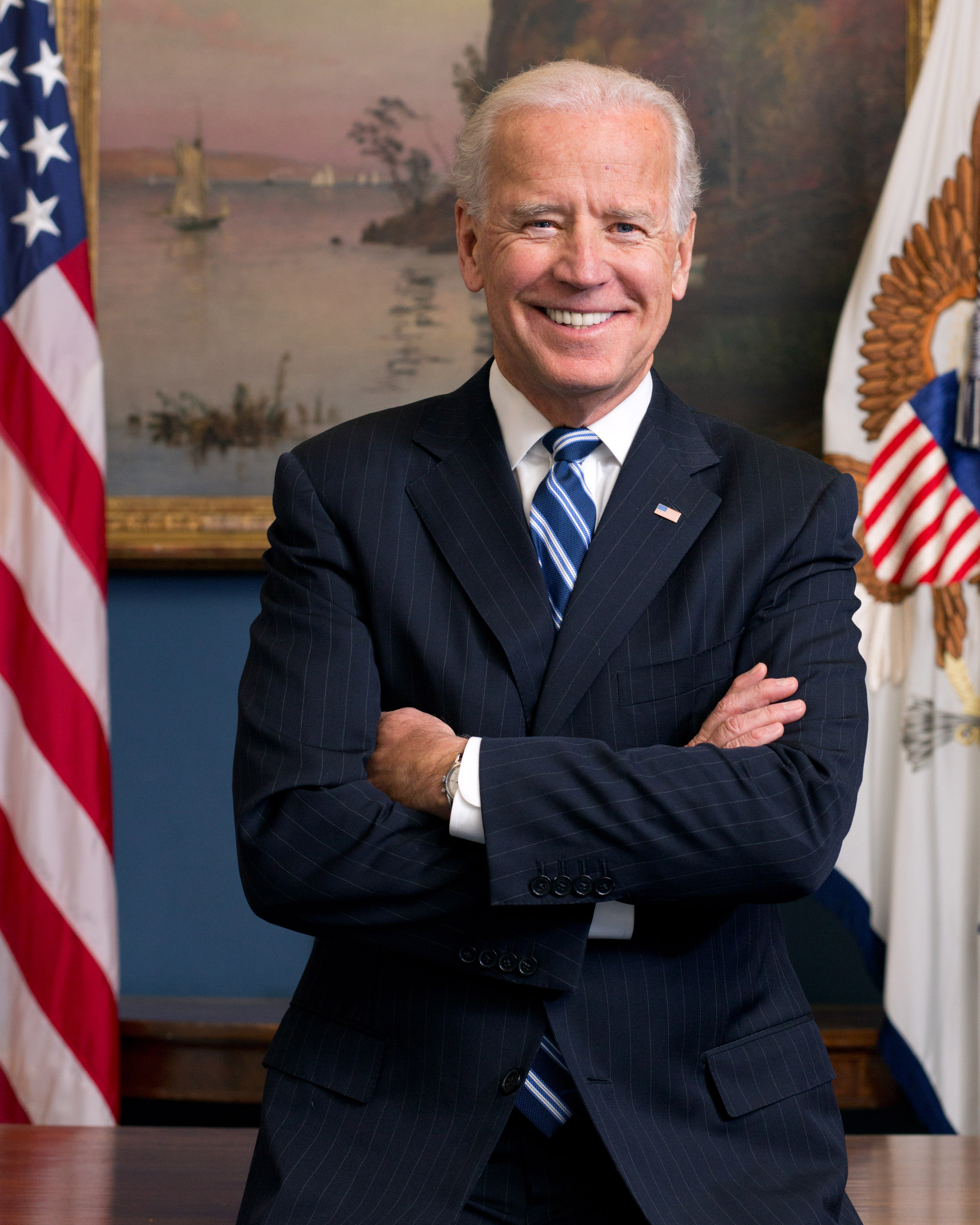
Biden's official portrait as vice president, 2013

Biden was inaugurated to a second term on January 20, 2013, at a small ceremony at Number One Observatory Circle, his official residence, with Justice Sonia Sotomayor presiding (a public ceremony took place on January 21). He played little part in discussions that led to the October 2013 passage of the Continuing Appropriations Act, 2014, which resolved the federal government shutdown of 2013 and the debt-ceiling crisis of 2013. Senate Majority Leader Harry Reid and other Democratic leaders cut him out of direct talks with Congress, feeling Biden had given too much away during previous negotiations.

Biden's Violence Against Women Act was reauthorized again in 2013. The act led to related developments, such as the White House Council on Women and Girls, begun in the first term, as well as the White House Task Force to Protect Students from Sexual Assault, begun in January 2014 with Biden and Valerie Jarrett as co-chairs. He talked about sexual violence while introducing Lady Gaga at the 88th Academy Awards in 2016, receiving a standing ovation from the audience.

In 2013, Biden favored arming Syria's rebel fighters in Operation Timber Sycamore. As the ISIL insurgency in Iraq intensified in 2014, renewed attention was paid to the Biden-Gelb Iraqi federalization plan of 2006, with some observers suggesting Biden had been right all along. He had close relationships with several Latin American leaders and visited the region 16 times during his vice presidency, the most of any president or vice president. In August 2016, Biden visited Serbia, where he met with the Serbian Prime Minister Aleksandar Vučić and expressed condolences for civilian victims of the bombing campaign during the Kosovo War. Biden never cast a tie-breaking vote in the Senate, making him the longest-serving vice president with this distinction.

During his second term, Biden was often said to be preparing for a bid for the 2016 Democratic presidential nomination. With his family, friends, and donors encouraging him in mid-2015 to enter the race, and with Hillary Clinton's favorability ratings in decline at that time, Biden was reported to be seriously considering the prospect and a "Draft Biden 2016" Political action committee (PAC) was established. During 2015, Biden was uncertain about running, particularly due to the recent death of his son Beau, before announcing his decision not to run that October.

== Between tenures (2017–2021) ==
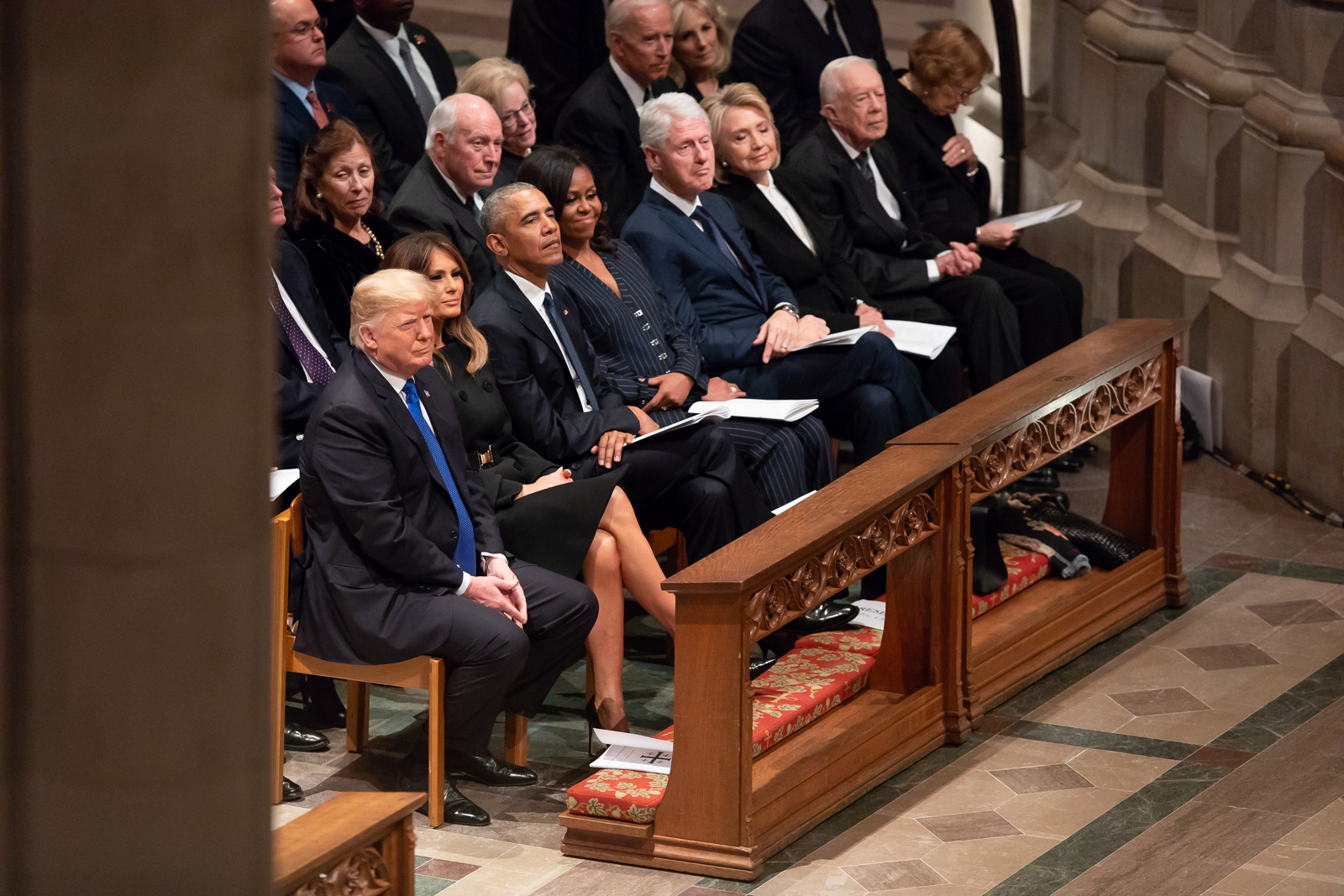
Biden attending the state funeral of George H. W. Bush in December 2018

Biden left office on January 20, 2017, and was succeeded by the 48th vice president of the United States, Mike Pence. After leaving the vice presidency, Biden became an honorary professor at the University of Pennsylvania, developing the Penn Biden Center for Diplomacy and Global Engagement. Biden remained in that position until 2019.

In 2017, Biden wrote a memoir, Promise Me, Dad, and went on a book tour. By 2019, he and his wife reported that they had earned over $15 million since the end of his vice presidency from speaking engagements and book sales.

Biden remained in the public eye, endorsing candidates while continuing to comment on politics, climate change, and the presidency of Donald Trump. He also continued to speak out in favor of LGBT rights, continuing advocacy on an issue he had become more closely associated with during his vice presidency. In 2018, he gave a eulogy for Senator John McCain. Biden continued to support cancer research.

== 2020 presidential campaign ==
=== Speculation and announcement ===
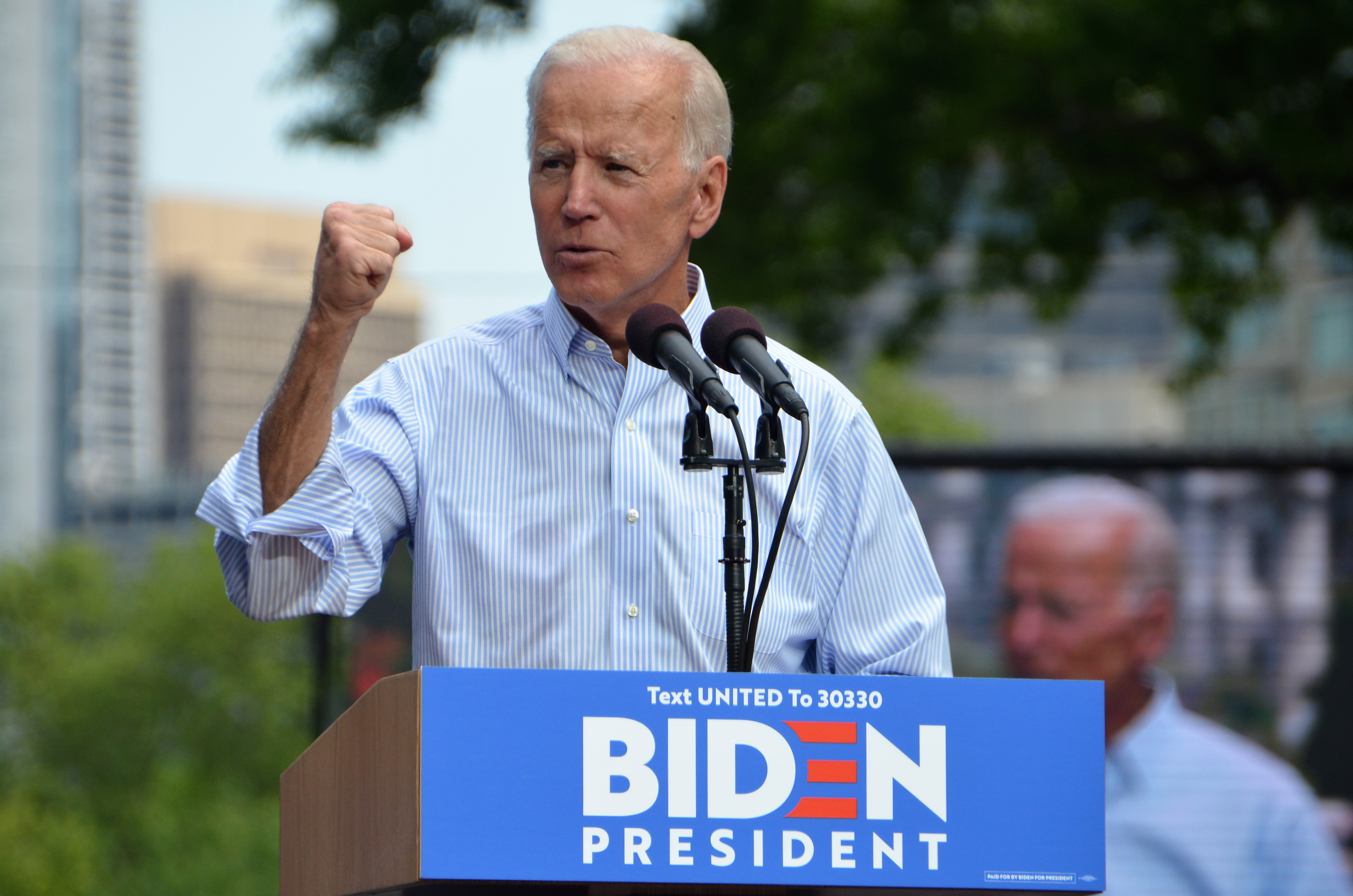
Biden at his presidential kickoff rally in Philadelphia, May 2019

Between 2016 and 2019, media outlets often mentioned Biden as a likely candidate for president in 2020. When asked if he would run, he gave varied and ambivalent answers, saying "never say never." A political action committee known as Time for Biden was formed in January 2018. Biden launched his campaign on April 25, 2019, saying he was worried by the Trump administration and felt a "sense of duty."

=== Campaign ===
Public polling showed Biden as one of the best-performing Democratic candidates head-to-head against Trump. With Democrats keenly focused on "electability" for defeating Trump, this boosted his popularity among Democratic voters. It also made Biden a frequent target of Trump. In September 2019, it was reported that Trump had pressured Ukrainian president Volodymyr Zelenskyy to investigate alleged wrongdoing by Biden and his son Hunter Biden. No evidence was produced of any wrongdoing by the Bidens. Trump was perceived by many as attempting to hurt Biden's chances of winning the presidency, resulting in a political scandal and Trump's impeachment.

In March 2019 and April 2019, eight women accused Biden of inappropriate physical contact, such as embracing, touching or kissing. Biden had previously called himself a "tactile politician" and admitted this behavior had caused trouble for him. Journalist Mark Bowden described Biden's lifelong habit of talking close, writing that he "doesn't just meet you, he engulfs you... scooting closer" and leaning forward to talk. In April 2019, Biden pledged to be more "respectful of people's personal space."

Throughout 2019, Biden stayed generally ahead of other Democrats in national polls. Despite this, he finished fourth in the Iowa caucuses and fifth in the New Hampshire primary. He performed better in the Nevada caucuses, reaching the 15% required for delegates, but still finished 21.6 percentage points behind Bernie Sanders. Making strong appeals to Black voters on the campaign trail and in the South Carolina debate, Biden won the South Carolina primary by more than 28 points. After the withdrawals and subsequent endorsements of candidates Pete Buttigieg and Amy Klobuchar, he made large gains in the Super Tuesday primaries. Biden won 18 of the next 26 contests, putting him in the lead. Elizabeth Warren and Michael Bloomberg soon dropped out, and Biden expanded his lead with victories over Sanders in four states on March 10. In March 2020, Biden said, "I view myself as a bridge, not as anything else. There's an entire generation of leaders you saw stand behind me. They are the future of this country."

In late March 2020, Tara Reade, one of the eight women who in 2019 had accused Biden of inappropriate physical contact, accused Biden of having sexually assaulted her in 1993. There were inconsistencies between Reade's 2019 and 2020 allegations. Biden and his campaign denied the sexual assault allegation.

When Sanders suspended his campaign on April 8, 2020, Biden became the Democratic Party's presumptive nominee. On April 13, Sanders endorsed Biden. Barack Obama endorsed Biden the next day. There was a great deal of interest in who his running mate would be, in part because of "the expectation, downplayed but not exactly denied by the Biden campaign, that the 77-year-old would be a one-term president." Biden said, "I view myself as a transition candidate." On August 11, Biden announced Kamala Harris as his running mate, making her the first African American and first South Asian American vice-presidential nominee on a major-party ticket. On August 18, at the 2020 Democratic National Convention, Biden officially became the Democratic Party nominee for president in the 2020 election.

=== Presidential election and transition ===
2020 electoral vote results. Biden won 306–232.

Biden was elected the 46th president in November 2020, defeating the incumbent, Donald Trump. Trump and numerous other Republicans repeatedly made false claims that widespread electoral fraud had occurred and that only he had legitimately won the election. (Note: Attributed to multiple references:) Biden's transition was delayed by several weeks as the White House ordered federal agencies not to cooperate. On November 23, General Services Administrator Emily W. Murphy formally recognized Biden as the apparent winner of the 2020 election and authorized the start of a transition process to the Biden administration.

Although most resulting lawsuits were either dismissed or ruled against by numerous courts, (Note: Attributed to multiple references:) Trump nonetheless conspired with his campaign team to submit documents in several states (all of which Biden had won) that falsely claimed to be legitimate electoral votes for President Trump and Vice President Mike Pence. (Note: Attributed to multiple references:) After the submission of these documents, the Trump campaign intended that the presiding officer of the United States Senate, either President of the Senate Pence or President pro tempore Chuck Grassley, would claim the unilateral power to reject electors during the January 6, 2021, vote counting session; the presiding officer would reject all electors from the several states for which the Trump campaign had submitted false documents, leaving 232 votes for Trump and 222 votes for Biden, thereby overturning the election results in Trump's favor. (Note: Attributed to multiple references:) This plan failed after Pence refused to cooperate with it. (Note: Attributed to multiple references:) Trump nevertheless urged his supporters on January 6 to march to the Capitol while the joint session of Congress was assembled there to count electoral votes and formalize Biden's victory, whereupon hundreds of people stormed the building and interrupted the count. During the attack, Biden addressed the nation, calling the events "an unprecedented assault unlike anything we've seen in modern times." After the Capitol was cleared, Congress officially counted the election results, with Pence, in his role as president of the Senate, announcing Biden and Harris as the winners. On January 7, Trump acknowledged the incoming administration without mentioning Biden's name.

== Presidency (2021–2025) ==
=== Inauguration ===
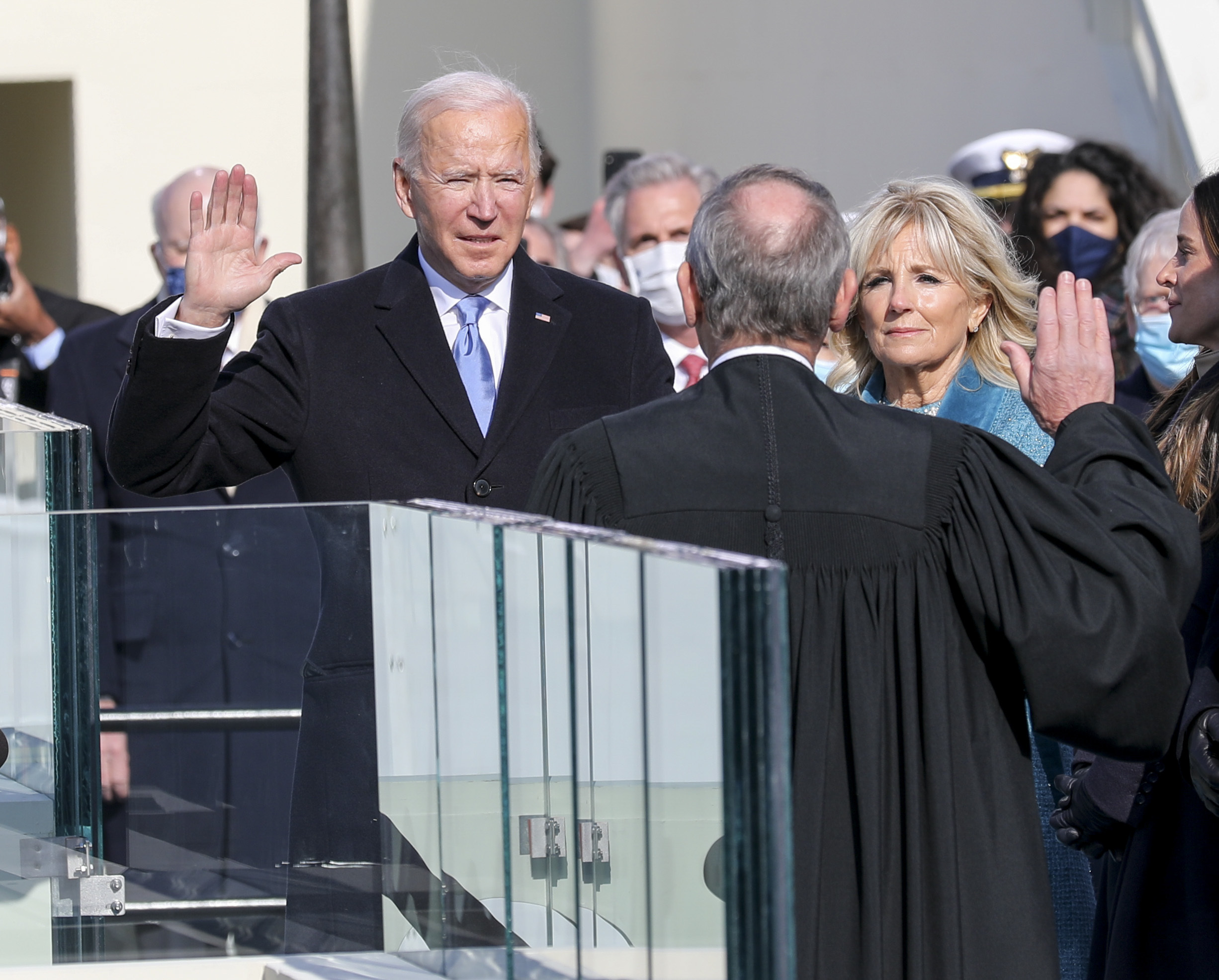
Biden taking the presidential oath of office administered by Chief Justice John Roberts at the Capitol on January 20, 2021

Biden was inaugurated as the 46th president of the United States on January 20, 2021. At 78, he was then the oldest person to assume the office up to that point. (Note: Donald Trump surpassed this record in 2025. While he was also 78 years old at the time, he was five months and 6 days older than Biden had been.) Biden was the second Catholic U.S. president, after John F. Kennedy, and the first president elected from the state of Delaware. He was also the first person since George H. W. Bush to have been both vice president and president, and the only president to date from the Silent Generation. Biden's inauguration was "a muted affair unlike any previous inauguration" due to COVID-19 precautions as well as massively increased security measures because of the January 6 United States Capitol attack.

=== First 100 days ===
In his first two days as president, Biden signed 17 executive orders. By his third day, orders had included rejoining the Paris Climate Agreement, ending the state of national emergency at the border with Mexico, directing the government to rejoin the World Health Organization, face mask requirements on federal property, measures to combat hunger in the United States, (Note: Attributed to multiple sources:) and revoking permits for the construction of the Keystone XL pipeline.

On March 11, Biden signed into law the American Rescue Plan Act of 2021, a $1.9 trillion economic stimulus and relief package that he had proposed to support the United States' recovery from the economic and health effects of the COVID-19 pandemic. The package included direct payments to most Americans, an extension of increased unemployment benefits, funds for vaccine distribution and school reopenings, and expansions of health insurance subsidies and the child tax credit. Biden's initial proposal included an increase of the federal minimum wage to $15 per hour, but after the Senate parliamentarian determined that including the increase in a budget reconciliation bill would violate Senate rules, Democrats removed it.

Also in March, amid a rise in migrants entering the U.S. from Mexico, Biden said migrant adults were "being sent back", in reference to the continuation of the Trump administration's Title 42 policy for quick deportations. He earlier announced that his administration would not deport unaccompanied migrant children; the rise in arrivals of such children exceeded the capacity of facilities meant to shelter them, leading the Biden administration in March to direct the Federal Emergency Management Agency to help.

On April 14, Biden announced that the United States would delay the withdrawal of all troops from the war in Afghanistan until September 11, signaling an end to the country's direct military involvement in Afghanistan after nearly 20 years. In February 2020, the Trump administration had made a deal with the Taliban to completely withdraw U.S. forces by May 1, 2021. Biden's decision met with a range of reactions, from support and relief to trepidation at the possible collapse of the Afghan government without American support. On April 22–23, Biden held an international climate summit at which he announced that the U.S. would cut its greenhouse gas emissions by 50%–52% by 2030 compared to 2005 levels. On April 28, the eve of his 100th day in office, Biden delivered his first address to a joint session of Congress.

=== Domestic policy ===
Biden delivers a speech at a joint session of Congress with Vice President Kamala Harris and House Speaker Nancy Pelosi on April 28, 2021. It was the first time a woman had occupied the Senate President chair during a joint session of Congress.

On June 17, Biden signed the Juneteenth National Independence Day Act, which officially declared Juneteenth a federal holiday. In July 2021, amid a slowing of the COVID-19 vaccination rate in the country and the spread of the SARS-CoV-2 Delta variant, Biden said that it was "gigantically important" for Americans to be vaccinated.

In 2022, Biden endorsed a change to the Senate filibuster to allow for the passing of the Freedom to Vote Act and John Lewis Voting Rights Act. The rules change failed when two Democratic senators joined Senate Republicans in opposing it. In April 2022, Biden signed into law the bipartisan Postal Service Reform Act of 2022 to revamp the finances and operations of the United States Postal Service agency. Biden supported the Bipartisan Safer Communities Act aimed to address gun reform issues following the Robb Elementary School shooting in Uvalde, Texas; he signed the bill on June 25, 2022.

The Honoring our PACT Act of 2022 was introduced in 2021 and signed into law by Biden on August 10, 2022. The act intended to significantly improve healthcare access and funding for veterans who were exposed to toxic substances, including burn pits, during military service.

In 2022, Biden signed the Respect for Marriage Act, which repealed the Defense of Marriage Act and requires the federal government to recognize the validity of same-sex and interracial marriages. In June 2024, Biden issued an executive action offering amnesty to unauthorized immigrants married to American citizens. The program included a pathway to U.S. residency and citizenship and was expected to initially affect about 500,000 people. It was later struck down due to lack of legislation empowering the president to enact the program.

In January 2025, Biden declared the lapsed Equal Rights Amendment ratified as the "28th Amendment" to the constitution. The declaration has no formal effect and the National Archives has said it does not intend to certify the amendment as part of the constitution due to "established legal, judicial, and procedural decisions".

==== Economic policy ====
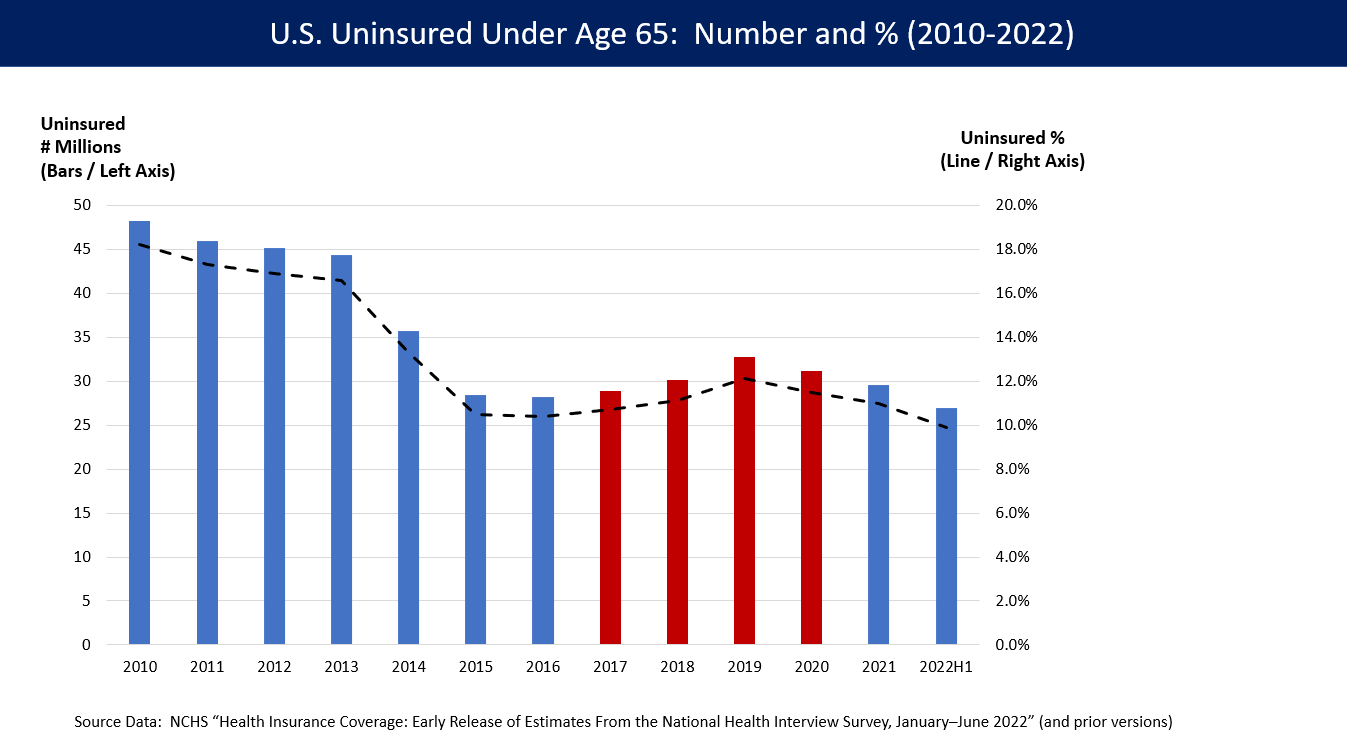
Percentage of uninsured Americans under age 65 from 2010 to 2022. The number and percentage of those uninsured under Biden fell to their lowest levels since 1997.

Biden entered office nine months into a recovery from the COVID-19 recession and his first year in office was characterized by robust growth in real GDP, employment, wages, and stock market returns, amid significantly elevated inflation. Real GDP grew 5.9%, the fastest rate in 37 years. Amid record job creation, the unemployment rate fell at the fastest pace on record. By the end of 2021, inflation rates measured by the consumer price index (CPI) reached a nearly 40-year high of 7.1%, which was partially offset by the highest nominal wage and salary growth in at least 20 years. The inflation rate peaked at 9% in June 2022. (Note: Attributed to multiple sources:) The inflation rate reached 2.9% and core inflation rate reached 3.2% on an annual basis in December 2024, the last full month of Biden's term. Between December 2020 and December 2024, CPI rose 21.3% overall, with an annualized inflation rate of 5.3% throughout Biden's term in office. The inflation rate remained above the Federal Reserve's 2% target every month since March 2021, resulting in elevated interest rates to combat inflation. Average wages increased 19% throughout Biden's presidency, falling behind inflation. The unemployment rate declined by over 2% and real GDP grew 11% during Biden's term. Total household net worth increased by 28%, largely driven by stocks and real estate. The national debt grew to $36.2 trillion, with a debt to GDP ratio of 123% and a deficit to GDP ratio of 6% in FY 2024. In February 2023, the unemployment rate fell to 3.4%, a 53-year low.

Amid a surge in inflation and high gas prices, Biden's approval ratings declined, with his disapproval rating surpassing his approval rating in early 2022. After 5.9% growth in 2021, real GDP growth cooled in 2022 to 2.1%, after slightly negative growth in the first half spurred recession concerns. Job creation and consumer spending remained strong, as the unemployment rate fell to match a 53-year low of 3.5% in December. Inflation peaked at 9.1% in June before easing to 3.2% by October 2023. Stocks had had their worst year since 2008 before recovering. Widespread predictions of an imminent recession did not materialize in 2022 or 2023, and by late 2023 indicators showed sharply lower inflation with economic acceleration. GDP growth hit 4.9% in the third quarter of 2023 and the year ended with stocks near record highs, with robust holiday spending.

Biden signed numerous major pieces of economic legislation in the 117th Congress, including the American Rescue Plan, Infrastructure Investment and Jobs Act, CHIPS and Science Act, and the Inflation Reduction Act. He signed the CHIPS and Science Act into law on August 9, 2022. It provided billions of dollars in new funding to boost domestic research on and manufacture of semiconductors, to compete economically with China. In his third month in office, Biden also signed an executive order to increase the minimum wage for federal contractors to $15 per hour. The order went into effect for 390,000 workers in January 2022. His administration rigorously enforced antitrust law.

In 2022, Biden blocked a national railroad strike planned by multiple labor unions. During the United Auto Workers strike, he expressed support for the workers. Biden joined striking UAW workers' picket line in Michigan, becoming the first president to join a picket line. He refused to block a port strike from the International Longshoremen's Association in October 2024.

Over the course of five days in March 2023, three small- to mid-size U.S. banks failed, triggering a sharp decline in global bank stock prices and swift response by regulators to prevent potential global contagion. After Silicon Valley Bank collapsed, the first to do so, Biden expressed opposition to a bailout by taxpayers. He claimed that the partial rollback of Dodd-Frank regulations contributed to the bank's failure.

At the beginning of the 118th Congress, Biden and congressional Republicans engaged in a standoff after the U.S. hit its debt limit, which raised the risk that the U.S. would default on its debt. Biden and House speaker Kevin McCarthy struck a deal to raise the debt limit, the Fiscal Responsibility Act of 2023, which suspended the debt limit until January 2025. Biden signed it on June 3, averting a default. The deal was generally seen as favorable to Biden.

Biden extended the COVID-19 student loan pause through September 2023, with an "on ramp" period that extended some of the pause's protections against credit reporting, collection efforts, and late payment fees through September 30, 2024. The Biden administration's attempts to implement student loan forgiveness and relief programs have faced legal challenges from a coalition of Republican-led states. Biden's plans to forgive student loan debt were estimated to cost over $519 billion, and some critics called them a "disaster".

==== Judiciary ====
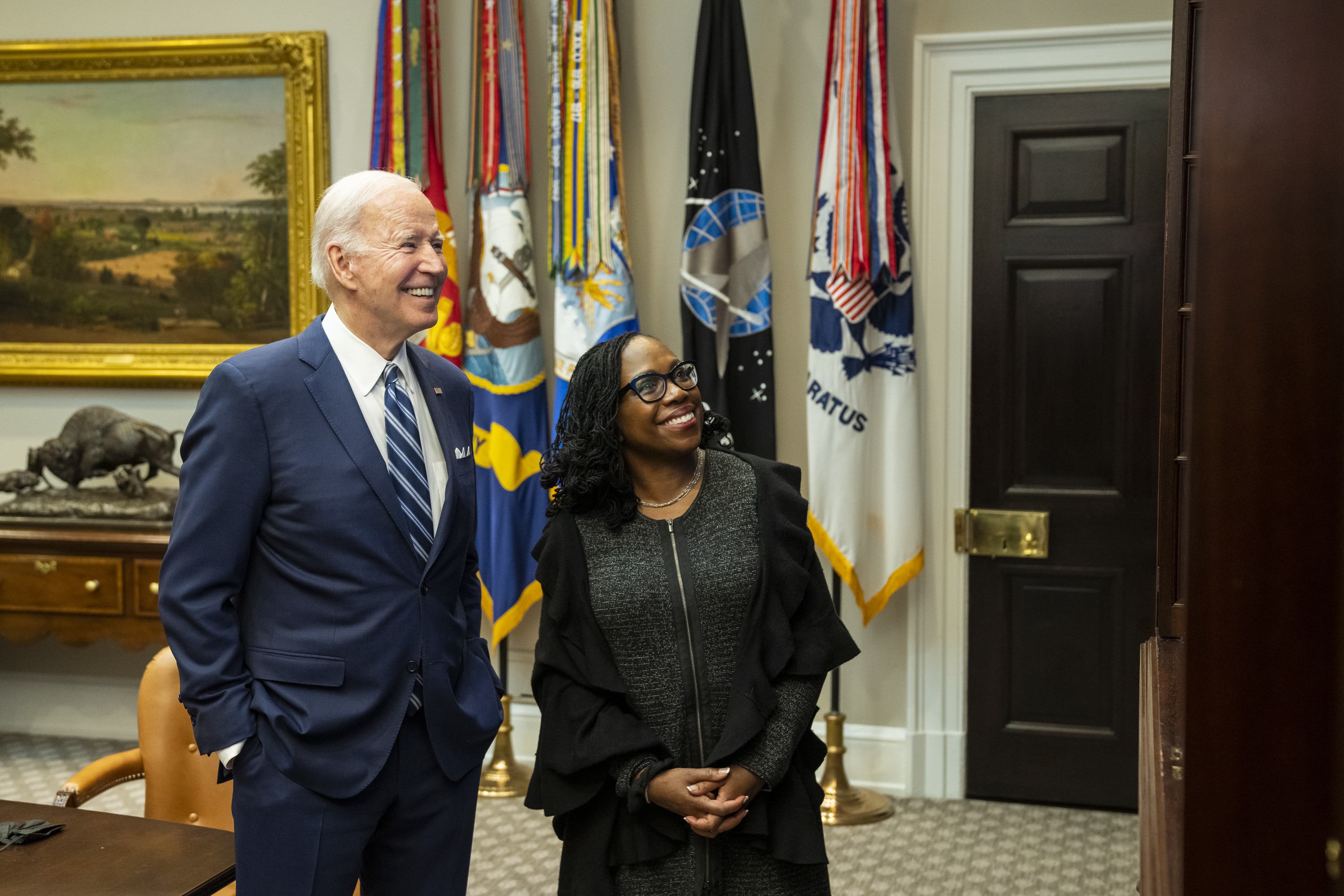
Biden and Ketanji Brown Jackson watching the U.S. Senate vote on her confirmation, April 2022

By the end of 2021, 40 of his nominees to the federal judiciary had been confirmed, more than any president in his first year in office since Ronald Reagan. Biden prioritized diversity in his judicial appointments more than any president in U.S. history, with most of his appointees being women and people of color.

In January 2022, Supreme Court justice Stephen Breyer announced his intention to retire. During his 2020 campaign, Biden vowed to nominate the first Black woman to the Supreme Court if a vacancy occurred, a promise he reiterated after Breyer announced his retirement. On February 25, Biden nominated federal judge Ketanji Brown Jackson. She was sworn in on June 30. By the end of his presidency, Biden had appointed 235 judges, more appointments in a single term than any other president in at least 50 years. 63% of Biden's judges were women and 60% were non-white. Biden expressed interest in judicial term limits and a binding ethics code for Supreme Court justices.

==== Infrastructure and climate ====
As part of Biden's Build Back Better agenda, in late March 2021, he proposed the American Jobs Plan, a $2 trillion package addressing issues including transport infrastructure, utilities infrastructure, broadband infrastructure, housing, schools, manufacturing, research and workforce development. After months of negotiations among Biden and lawmakers, in August 2021 the Senate passed a $1 trillion bipartisan infrastructure bill called the Infrastructure Investment and Jobs Act, while the House, also in a bipartisan manner, approved that bill in early November 2021, covering infrastructure related to transport, utilities, and broadband. Biden signed the bill into law in mid-November 2021.

The other core part of the Build Back Better agenda was the Build Back Better Act, a $3.5 trillion social spending bill that expands the social safety net and includes major provisions on climate change. Democrats attempted to pass it on a party-line vote through budget reconciliation, but struggled to win the support of Senator Joe Manchin, even as the price was lowered to $2.2 trillion. After Manchin rejected the bill, it was comprehensively reworked into the Inflation Reduction Act of 2022, covering deficit reduction, climate change, healthcare, and tax reform.

The Inflation Reduction Act of 2022 was introduced by Manchin and Senator Chuck Schumer. The package aimed to raise $739 billion and authorize $370 billion in spending on energy and climate change, $300 billion in deficit reduction, three years of Affordable Care Act subsidies, prescription drug reform to lower prices, and tax reform. According to an analysis by the Rhodium Group, the bill will lower U.S. greenhouse gas emissions between 31 percent and 44 percent below 2005 levels by 2030. On August 7, 2022, the Senate passed the bill (as amended) on a 51–50 vote, with all Democrats voting in favor, all Republicans opposed, and Vice President Kamala Harris breaking the tie. Biden signed the bill on August 16.

Before and during the 2021 United Nations Climate Change Conference (COP26), Biden promoted an agreement that the U.S. and the European Union cut methane emissions by a third by 2030 and tried to add dozens of other countries to the effort. Biden pledged to double climate funding to developing countries by 2024. Also at COP26, the U.S. and China reached a deal on greenhouse gas emission reduction. The two countries are responsible for 40 percent of global emissions. In July 2023, when heat waves hit the United States, Biden announced measures to protect the population and said the heat waves were linked to climate change. In April 2024, he unveiled a plan to protect and restore natural water sources (3.2 million hectares of wetlands and 161,000 km of waterways).

Biden protected 674 million acres of land and ocean from natural resource exploitation, more than any other president. The vast majority of the conservation came from a ban on offshore drilling in 625 million acres of ocean.

==== Immigration ====
Yearly numbers of illegal immigrants apprehended at the U.S. southern border

On taking office, Biden unveiled the U.S. Citizenship Act of 2021 and moved to dismantle several policies implemented under Donald Trump, halting construction of the Mexico–United States border wall, ending Trump's travel ban on countries with predominantly Muslim populations, and signing an executive order to reaffirm protections for DACA recipients. The Department of Homeland Security narrowed the scope of interior immigration enforcement, directing Immigration and Customs Enforcement (ICE) to prioritize national security and violent crime concerns.

Illegal border crossings at the Mexico–United States border began to surge in 2021 when Biden assumed office, (Note: Attributed to multiple sources:) reaching an all-time monthly high in December 2023. Throughout 2024, crossings began to significantly decline from the December record, after Biden implemented restrictions on asylum claims from migrants who cross the border between ports of entry and urged Mexico to crack down on migrants. Deportations from October 2023 to September 2024 reached the highest level since 2014. Biden used humanitarian parole to mitigate illegal border crossings, allowing migrants to fly into the U.S. or schedule their entries through official entry points in the U.S.-Mexico border. Over a million migrants had been admitted to the U.S. under humanitarian parole as of January 2024.

Between January 2021 and January 2024, the US Border Patrol confirmed more than 7.2 million illegal migrants trying to cross the Mexico–United States border, not counting gotaways. 2023 was a record year, with over 2.5 million encounters. In response to sustained high levels of migration and growing political pressure, the administration implemented stricter measures beginning in 2023. Biden faced criticism from immigration advocates for extending Title 42, a Trump administration border restriction that arose due to the COVID-19 pandemic, and for restarting the use of "expedited removal" of certain Central American families. In May 2023, the Biden administration approved sending 1,500 more troops to the U.S.-Mexico border as Title 42 expired.

In January 2024, Biden expressed support for a proposed bipartisan immigration deal led by Senators Kyrsten Sinema and James Lankford. The proposed bipartisan bill would have allowed Department of Homeland Security (DHS) to close the border when encounters reach a seven-day average of 5,000 or exceed 8,500 in a single day. In addition, the bill would have mandated the detention of migrants seeking asylum and undergoing asylum interviews, with those failing the process repatriated to their home countries. While not addressing the status of "Dreamers", it would have changed immigration law to allow the children of those with H-1B visas to get work authorizations and freeze their legal ages while waiting for green cards, rather than face deportation once they turn 21, and provide additional funding for immigration judges.

Former president Donald Trump announced his opposition to the legislation, calling on Congressional Republicans to oppose it; subsequently, leaders such as Speaker of the House Mike Johnson announced their opposition, halting further legislative action. As a result of continued high immigration levels throughout his tenure, some lawmakers and pundits have criticized Biden's handling of the southern border. Criticism of the bill and broader immigration policy continued to be expressed by both sides, with some liberals considering his policies too harsh while some conservatives considered them too lax. On January 17, 2024, a Republican-led non-binding resolution denouncing the Biden-Harris administration's handling of the U.S. southern border passed the House of Representatives by a vote of 225–187, with 211 Republicans and 14 Democrats supporting it. In the final year of his presidency, the Biden administration worked to extend at least 14 contracts with private prison companies to run immigrant detention centers, despite his 2020 campaign promise to end the practice. In June 2024, Biden issued an executive order allowing the president to restrict the Mexico–U.S. border.

==== Pardons and commutations ====
Biden issued more individual pardons and commutations than any other president. In October 2022, he pardoned all Americans convicted of "small" amounts of cannabis possession under federal law. In December 2023, he pardoned Americans for cannabis use or possession on federal lands regardless of whether they had been charged or prosecuted. In December 2024, in the largest single-day clemency act in history, Biden granted clemency to about 1,500 nonviolent felons in home confinement who had previously been released from prison. The act generated controversy, as it included felons such as Michael Conahan, a judge involved in the kids for cash kickback scandal, and Rita Crundwell, a comptroller responsible for the single largest municipal fraud in U.S. history. The Biden administration said the offenders who received clemency "deserve a second chance" and were selected based on meeting certain criteria in a uniform decision. Also in December 2024, Biden commuted the sentences of 37 out of 40 federal death row inmates. On his last full day in office, Biden commuted the sentence of Leonard Peltier to house arrest. Peltier had been convicted of murdering two FBI agents in 1975 and had served almost 50 years in prison. Biden also pardoned two Democratic officials: Ernest William Cromartie, who had served his prison sentence for tax evasion, and Gerald G. Lundergan, convicted of a scheme to funnel money to his daughter's Senate campaign and released in 2023.

On December 1, 2024, Biden issued a "full and unconditional" pardon to his son Hunter that covered all federal offenses between that day and 2014, breaking his June 2024 pledge not to do so. In a statement announcing the pardon, Biden said he believed his son was "selectively, and unfairly, prosecuted".

On his last full day in office, Biden pardoned five family members, including his brother James, and others targeted for retribution by his successor. They included former chairman of the Joint Chiefs of Staff Mark Milley, former National Institute of Allergy and Infectious Diseases director Anthony Fauci, and members and participants in the House Select Committee on the January 6 Attack. Biden said the pardons were preemptive, to protect the individuals against the incoming Trump administration's politically motivated vengeance, and should not be seen as an acknowledgment of wrongdoing.

==== 2022 elections ====
On September 2, 2022, in a nationally broadcast Philadelphia speech, Biden called for a "battle for the soul of the nation". Off camera, he called Trump supporters "semi-fascists", which Republican commentators denounced. A predicted Republican wave election did not materialize and the race for U.S. Congress control was much closer than expected, with Republicans securing a slim majority of 222 seats in the House of Representatives, (Note: Attributed to multiple sources:) and the Democratic caucus keeping control of the U.S. Senate. (Note: Kyrsten Sinema and Joe Manchin, whose seats were not up for election in 2022, left the Democratic Party and became independent politicians in December 2022 and May 2024, respectively. As a result, 47 Democrats (rather than 49), plus Angus King and Bernie Sanders, independents who caucus with Democrats, were in the Senate of the 118th United States Congress, on May 31, 2024. Manchin continued to caucus with Democrats while Sinema opted to caucus with neither party but to align with the Democrats, bringing the Democratic Senate majority to 51 seats.)

It was the first midterm election since 1986 in which the incumbent president's party achieved a net gain in governorships, and the first since 1934 in which the president's party lost no state legislative chambers. Democrats credited Biden for their unexpectedly strong performance, but they likely overperformed for other reasons, including the Supreme Court overturning Roe v. Wade and poor Republican candidate quality in many races.

=== Foreign policy ===
In June 2021, Biden took his first trip abroad as president, visiting Belgium, Switzerland, and the United Kingdom. He attended a G7 summit, a NATO summit, and an EU summit, and held one-on-one talks with Russian president Vladimir Putin. In September 2021, Biden announced AUKUS, a defense pact between Australia, the United Kingdom and the United States, to ensure "peace and stability in the Indo-Pacific".

In February 2021, the Biden administration announced that the United States was ending its support for the Saudi-led bombing campaign in Yemen and revoked the designation of Yemen's Houthis as terrorists. In early February 2022, Biden ordered the counterterrorism raid in northern Syria that resulted in the death of Abu Ibrahim al-Hashimi al-Qurashi, the second leader of the Islamic State. In late July, Biden approved the drone strike that killed Ayman al-Zawahiri, the second leader of Al-Qaeda, and an integral member in the planning of the September 11 attacks. The 2022 OPEC+ oil production cut caused a diplomatic spat with Saudi Arabia, threatening a longstanding alliance.

In August 2024, Biden negotiated and oversaw the 2024 Ankara prisoner exchange, the largest prisoner exchange since the end of the Cold War. It involved the release of 26 people, including journalist Evan Gershkovich and former Marine Paul Whelan. In November 2024, the Biden administration announced that it had helped broker a ceasefire agreement in the Israel–Hezbollah conflict. (Note: Attributed to multiple sources:)

==== Withdrawal from Afghanistan ====
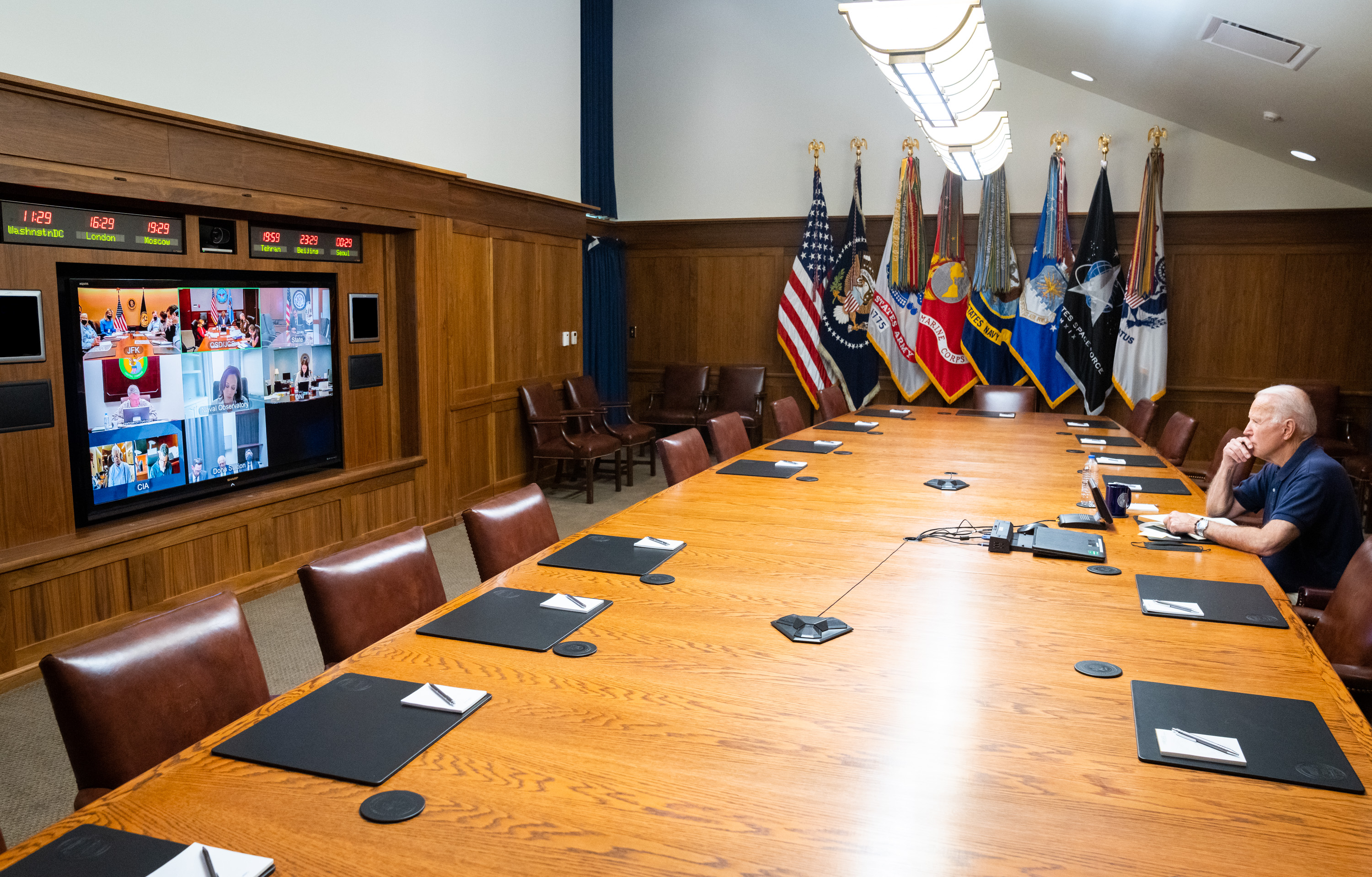
Biden in a video conference with Vice President Kamala Harris and the U.S. National Security team, discussing the Fall of Kabul on August 15, 2021

American forces had begun withdrawing from Afghanistan in 2020, under the provisions of a February 2020 US-Taliban agreement that set a May 1, 2021, deadline. The Taliban began an offensive on May 1. By early July, most American troops in Afghanistan had withdrawn. Biden addressed the withdrawal in July, saying, "The likelihood there's going to be the Taliban overrunning everything and owning the whole country is highly unlikely."

On August 15, the Afghan government collapsed under the Taliban offensive, and Afghan President Ashraf Ghani fled the country. Biden reacted by ordering 6,000 American troops to assist with evacuating American personnel and Afghan allies. He faced bipartisan criticism for the manner of the withdrawal, with the evacuations described as chaotic and botched. On August 16, Biden addressed the "messy" situation, taking responsibility for it, and admitting that the situation "unfolded more quickly than we had anticipated". He defended his decision to withdraw, saying that Americans should not be "dying in a war that Afghan forces are not willing to fight for themselves".

On August 26, a suicide bombing at the Kabul airport killed 13 U.S. service members and 169 Afghans. On August 27, an American drone strike killed two ISIS-K targets, who were "planners and facilitators", according to a U.S. Army general. The U.S. military completed its withdrawal from Afghanistan on August 30. Biden called the extraction of over 120,000 Americans, Afghans, and other allies "an extraordinary success". He acknowledged that up to 200 Americans who wanted to leave did not, despite his August 18 pledge to keep troops in Afghanistan until all Americans who wanted to leave had left.

After the withdrawal, the U.S. continued to send aid to Afghanistan, remaining its biggest aid donor as of August 2024 and spending at least $20.7 billion post-withdrawal. U.S. funding has helped support the Taliban government and stabilize Afghanistan's economy. On September 25, 2024, the United States House of Representatives passed a resolution condemning the Biden administration for the U.S. withdrawal from Afghanistan, with ten Democrats and all Republicans voting in favor.

==== 2022 Russian invasion of Ukraine ====
In February 2022, the Russian Armed Forces under President Vladimir Putin launched an invasion of Ukraine. After warning for several weeks that an attack was imminent, Biden responded by imposing severe sanctions on Russia and authorizing over $8 billion in weapons shipments to Ukraine. On April 29, he asked Congress for $33 billion for Ukraine, but lawmakers later increased it to about $40 billion. Biden blamed Putin for the emerging energy and food crises.

In 2022, Congress approved about $113 billion in aid to Ukraine. In October 2023, the Biden administration requested an additional $61.4 billion in aid for Ukraine for the year ahead, but delays in the passage of further aid by the House of Representatives inhibited progress, with the additional $61 billion in aid to Ukraine added in April 2024. Actually delivered aid often differed from announced levels and was also often delayed. The Government Accountability Office and Pentagon Inspector General found that the Biden administration seemed unaware of the pace of weapons deliveries.

Throughout the conflict, Biden consistently refused Ukrainian requests to allow them to utilize weapons against Russian military targets inside Russia. An exception was granted in May 2024 for targets in the vicinity of Kharkiv for "counter-fire" purposes. (Note: Attributed to multiple sources:) Biden also blocked access for some weapons systems altogether, typically citing fears of escalation, only to permit deliveries for some weapons later on. (Note: Attributed to multiple sources:)

==== China affairs ====
The Solomon Islands-China security pact caused alarm in late 2022, as China could build military bases across the South Pacific. Biden sought to strengthen ties with Australia and New Zealand in the wake of the deal. In a September 2022 interview with 60 Minutes, Biden said that U.S. forces would defend Taiwan in the event of "an unprecedented attack" by the Chinese, which is in contrast to the long-standing U.S. policy of "strategic ambiguity" toward China and Taiwan. The September comments came after three previous comments by Biden that the U.S. would defend Taiwan in the event of a Chinese invasion. Amid increasing tension with China, Biden's administration has repeatedly walked back his statements and asserted that U.S. policy toward Taiwan has not changed. In late 2022, Biden issued several executive orders and federal rules designed to slow Chinese technological growth, and maintain U.S. leadership over computing, biotech, and clean energy.

On February 4, 2023, Biden ordered the United States Air Force to shoot down a suspected Chinese surveillance balloon off the coast of South Carolina. The Chinese government denied that the balloon was a surveillance device, instead claiming it was a civilian airship that had blown off course. Secretary of State Antony Blinken postponed his planned visit to China as the incident further damaged U.S.-China relations. In May 2024, the Biden administration doubled tariffs on solar cells imported from China and more than tripled tariffs on lithium-ion electric vehicle batteries imported from China. It also raised tariffs on imports of Chinese steel, aluminum, and medical materials.

In April 2024, Biden signed the Protecting Americans from Foreign Adversary Controlled Applications Act, which would ban social networking services if they are determined by the president and relevant provisions to be a "foreign adversary controlled application". The act explicitly applies to ByteDance Ltd. and its subsidiaries, which are based in China. It ceases to be applicable if the application is divested and no longer considered to be controlled by a foreign adversary of the United States. Biden had signed the No TikTok on Government Devices Act in December 2022, prohibiting the use of TikTok on devices owned by the federal government.

==== Gaza war ====
In October 2023, Hamas launched a surprise attack on Israel that devolved into an intensified conflict, jeopardizing the administration's push to normalize relations between Israel and Saudi Arabia. Biden stated his unequivocal support for Israel and condemned the attack by Hamas, but discouraged Israel from initiating a ground invasion of Gaza. Upon Israel's retaliation against Hamas, Biden deployed aircraft carriers in the region to deter others from joining the war, and called for an additional $14 billion in military aid to Israel. He later began pressuring Israel to address the growing humanitarian crisis in the Gaza Strip. Biden rejected calls for a ceasefire but said he supported "humanitarian pauses" to deliver aid to the Gaza Strip. He asked Israel to pause its invasion of Gaza for at least three days to allow for hostage negotiations; Israel agreed to daily four-hour pauses. He also directed the U.S. military to facilitate the delivery of humanitarian aid to Palestinians in Gaza. Biden has said he is a Zionist. He has faced criticism for his unwavering support for Israel. Officials have urged him to take a harder stance against Israel, criticizing his administration's leniency and support despite the Israeli government's contentious offensive, which has led to significant civilian casualties and humanitarian crises.

Following the killing of Palestinian civilians receiving food aid on February 29, 2024, Biden said the current level of aid flowing into Gaza was insufficient. On March 3, the U.S. military began airdropping food aid into Gaza. Several experts called the U.S. airdrops performative and said they would do little to alleviate the famine in Gaza.

Biden continued to support Israel during the course of the war despite significant domestic opposition to American involvement in it and subsequent widespread protests. A March 2024 Gallup poll found that a strong majority of Americans disapproved of Israeli conduct during the war. Beginning in April 2024, widespread Gaza war protests emerged on university campuses, denouncing Biden.

On May 31, 2024, Biden announced his support for an Israeli ceasefire proposal, saying that Hamas was "no longer capable" of another large-scale attack. The proposal, which was intended to establish a permanent ceasefire, bring about the release of all hostages, and lead to the reconstruction of the Gaza Strip, was supported by Hamas officials after mediation by Egypt and Qatar. The Netanyahu administration responded that Israel's goals regarding "the destruction of Hamas military and governing capabilities" had not changed and that conditions would need to be met before it would agree to a ceasefire. In the first year of the war, it was estimated that the Biden administration had sent Israel at least $17.9 billion in military aid, a record. In about the same period, it sent Palestinians $1.2 billion in humanitarian aid. Biden was reported by journalist Bob Woodward to have clashed throughout the war with Netanyahu over his war strategy and lack of a postwar plan for Gaza. In the last week of Biden's presidency, Qatari officials announced that Hamas had accepted the ceasefire deal; Biden hailed the deal.

==== NATO enlargement ====
Following the 2022 Russian invasion of Ukraine, Biden expressed support for expanding NATO to cover Sweden and Finland. On August 9, 2022, he signed the instruments of ratification stipulating U.S. support for the two countries' entry into NATO. Finnish ascension occurred on April 4, 2023, but opposition by Turkey and Hungary to Swedish entry led to a stalemate. Biden led diplomatic talks resulting in formal Swedish ascension into NATO on March 7, 2024. He has also expressed openness to Ukrainian entry into NATO following the end of the conflict, supporting an expedited timetable in its ascension and the removal of steps such as the Membership Action Plan typically required for NATO entry.

=== Investigations ===
==== Retention of classified documents ====
In November 2022, Biden's attorneys found classified documents dating from his vice presidency in a "locked closet" at the Penn Biden Center. According to the White House, the documents were reported to the U.S. National Archives, which recovered them the next day. On November 14, Attorney General Merrick Garland appointed John R. Lausch Jr. to conduct an investigation. On December 20, a second batch of classified documents was discovered in the garage of Biden's Wilmington residence.

On January 12, 2023, Garland appointed Robert K. Hur as special counsel to investigate "possible unauthorized removal and retention of classified documents or other records". On January 20, after a 13-hour consensual search by FBI investigators, six more items with classified markings were recovered from Biden's Wilmington residence. FBI agents searched Biden's home in Rehoboth Beach on February 1 and collected papers from his time as vice president, but did not find any classified information. On February 8, 2024, Hur announced that no charges would be brought against Biden.

==== Business activities ====
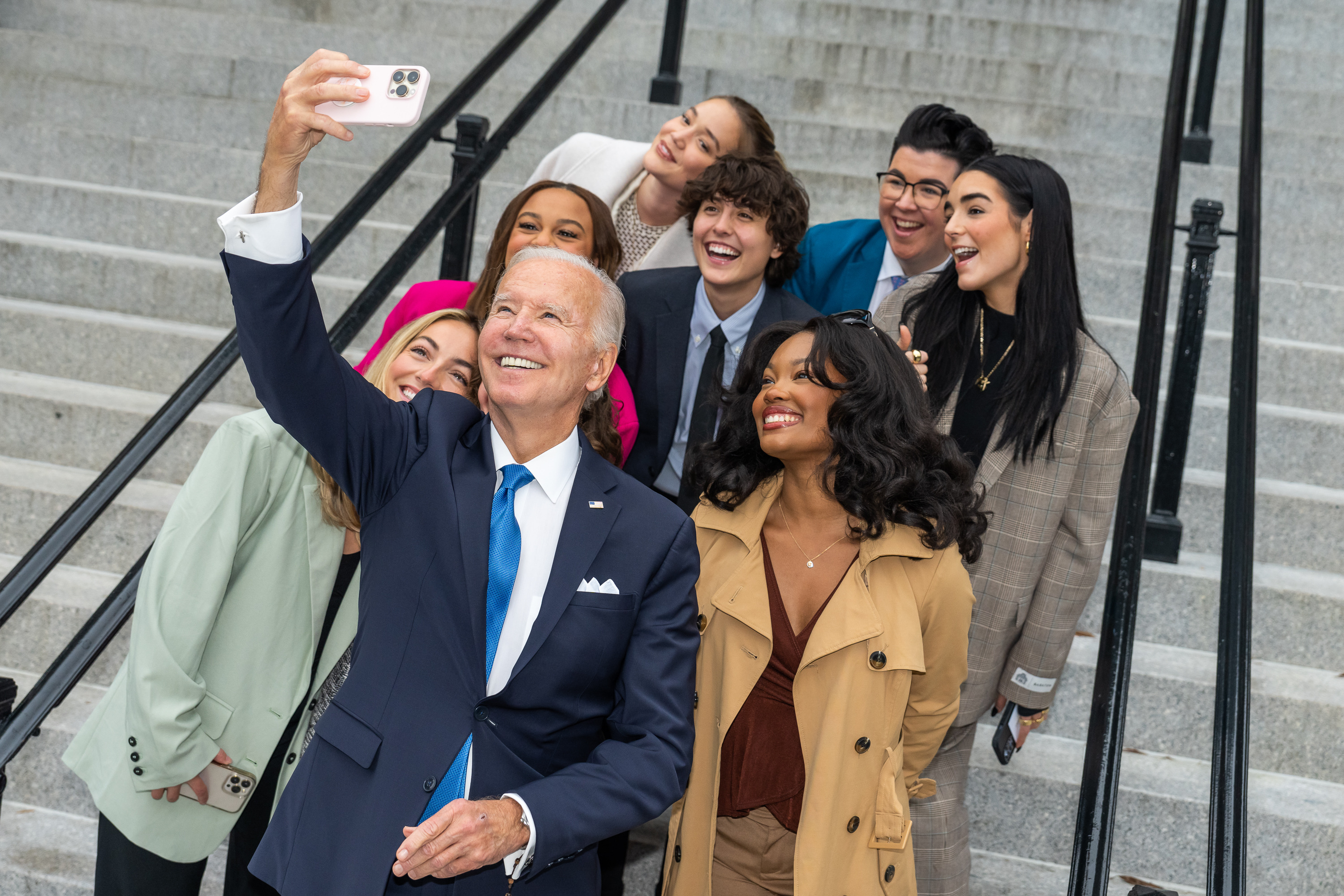
Biden taking a selfie with digital content creators in front of the Eisenhower Executive Office Building on October 25, 2022

On January 11, 2023, the House of Representatives launched an investigative committee into the foreign business activities of Biden's son, Hunter, and brother, James. The committee's chair, Representative James Comer, simultaneously investigated alleged corruption related to the Hunter Biden laptop controversy.

On September 12, House speaker Kevin McCarthy initiated a formal impeachment inquiry against Biden, saying that the House investigations "paint a picture of corruption" by Biden and his family. (Note: Attributed to multiple sources:) Congressional investigations, including by the House Oversight committee, have discovered no evidence of wrongdoing by Biden as of December 2023. (Note: Attributed to multiple sources:) On December 13, 2023, the House of Representatives voted 221–212 to formalize an impeachment inquiry into Biden.

In February 2024, Alexander Smirnov, a former intelligence informant who was prominent in the bribery allegations against Biden, was charged with making false statements. Smirnov admitted he had publicized a false story given to him by Russian intelligence officials with the goal of damaging Biden's reelection campaign.

=== Age and health concerns ===
As of 2025, Biden was the oldest sitting president in U.S. history. His cognitive health was perceived to have declined by Republicans and some media figures, and privately by some Democrats. Members of Biden's family and White House staffers insulated Biden from scrutiny of his advanced aging and decline in acuity.

The media widely covered public concern about Biden's mental acuity after a weak performance in a June 2024 presidential debate, but gave it limited coverage beforehand, in part due to harsh pushback from White House officials. Biden initially deemed himself fit to serve two terms as president, but after the 2024 election said that he may have been too old to serve a second term.

As part of the investigation into Biden's handling of classified documents, special counsel Robert Hur said that Biden did not remember when he was vice president ("if it was 2013—when did I stop being vice president?") or when his son Beau died. Hur wrote that his memory "appeared to have significant limitations".

On July 21, 2022, Biden tested positive for COVID-19 with reportedly mild symptoms. According to the White House, he was treated with Paxlovid. He worked in isolation in the White House for five days and returned to isolation when he tested positive again on July 30. On July 17, 2024, Biden again tested positive for COVID-19.

=== 2024 presidential campaign ===
Biden addressing the nation on July 24, 2024, about his withdrawal from the election three days earlier

Ending months of speculation, on April 25, 2023, Biden confirmed he would run for reelection as president in the 2024 election, with Harris again as his running mate. On the day of his announcement, a Gallup poll found that Biden's approval rating was 37 percent, with most of those surveyed saying the economy was their biggest concern. During his campaign, Biden promoted higher economic growth and recovery. He frequently stated his intention to "finish the job" as a political rallying cry.

U.S. Representative Dean Phillips ran against Biden in the 2024 Democratic presidential primaries. Phillips campaigned as a younger alternative to Biden, arguing that he would be a stronger opponent to Trump in the general election. Biden was not on the ballot in the January 23, New Hampshire primary, but won it in a write-in campaign with 63.8% of the vote. He had wanted South Carolina to be the first primary, and won that state on February 3 with 96.2% of the vote. Biden received 89.3% of the vote in Nevada and 81.1% of the vote in Michigan. On March 5 ("Super Tuesday"), he won 15 of 16 primaries, netting 80% or more of the vote in 13. Biden lost the American Samoa contest to venture capitalist Jason Palmer, becoming the first incumbent president to lose a contest while appearing on the ballot since Jimmy Carter in 1980. On March 6, Phillips suspended his campaign and endorsed Biden. On March 12, Biden reached more than the 1,968 delegates needed to win the Democratic nomination, becoming the presumptive nominee.

The first presidential debate was held on June 27, 2024, between Biden and Trump. Biden's performance was widely criticized, with commentators saying he frequently lost his train of thought and gave meandering answers. Several newspaper columnists declared Trump the winner, (Note: Attributed to multiple sources:) and polling indicated the majority of viewers believed Trump won. After the debate raised questions about his health and age, Biden faced calls to withdraw from the race, including from Democrats and the editorial boards of various major news outlets.

Biden initially insisted that he would remain a candidate, but on July 21, he withdrew from the race, writing that this was "in the best interest of my party and the country". He immediately endorsed Harris to replace him as the party's presidential nominee. On August 6, 2024, Harris officially became the Democratic presidential nominee. This was the first time an eligible incumbent had withdrawn a bid for reelection since 1968.

In the general election, Trump defeated Harris. The Senate went Republican for the first time since 2018. In a nationally televised speech after the election, Biden congratulated Trump and promised a "peaceful and orderly" transition of power. In a January 2025 interview, Biden claimed he could have defeated Trump had he not been persuaded to withdraw from the election, despite lagging behind Trump in polling. A YouGov poll conducted on November 6–7, 2024, found that if Biden had been the Democratic nominee, Trump would have won the popular vote by 49% to 42%. Trump won the popular vote over Harris by 49.8% to 48.3%.

== Post-presidency (2025–present) ==
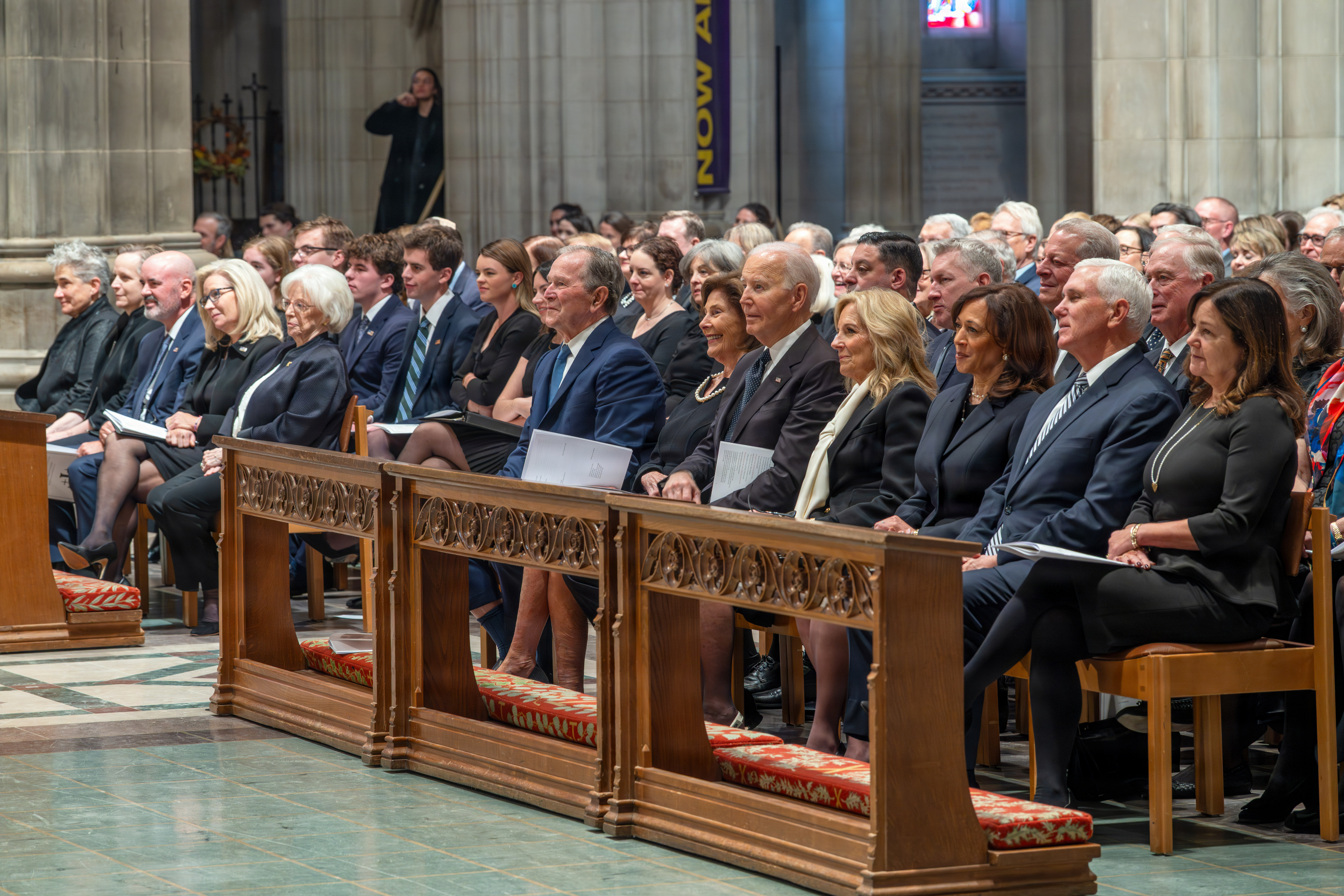
Biden (front row, fifth from the right), on his 83rd birthday, attending the funeral of Dick Cheney in November 2025

Biden's term ended on January 20, 2025. At the end of his presidency, Biden designated former senior advisors Anthony Bernal and Annie Tomasini to raise funds for the Joseph R. Biden Jr. Presidential Library. He later signed with talent agency Creative Artists Agency (CAA), which previously represented him from 2017 to 2020. On February 7, President Trump revoked Biden's security clearance. Former presidents have traditionally been granted access to intelligence briefings, though such access is at the sitting president's discretion. In 2021, Biden had revoked Trump's security clearance for his role in inciting the January 6 Capitol attack. On April 15, Biden made his first major public appearance since leaving office, delivering remarks at an Advocates, Counselors and Representatives for the Disabled (ACRD) conference in Chicago. On April 26, Biden and his wife attended the state funeral of Pope Francis in Vatican City. On May 7, Biden appeared on The View to defend his presidential legacy. On September 6, Biden announced that his proposed presidential center would be in Delaware. On November 20, Biden and his wife attended former Vice President Dick Cheney's funeral.

On March 6, 2026, Biden gave a speech at civil rights activist Jesse Jackson's memorial service. On April 13, he returned to Syracuse University for a ceremony unveiling his official portrait at the College of Law. On June 18, Biden attended the Barack Obama Presidential Center's opening ceremony. In July 2026, Biden announced his third memoir, Promise Me, America, which focuses on his presidency. It was released on November 17, 2026.

=== Health ===
On May 18, 2025, Biden's office announced that he had been diagnosed with aggressive prostate cancer with bone metastasis during a routine physical examination. On May 30, Biden confirmed that he had begun treatment. On September 4, Biden's spokesperson confirmed that he had recently undergone Mohs surgery to remove skin cancer lesions from his forehead. The procedure followed a 2023 removal of a basal-cell carcinoma from his chest. On October 11, Biden's spokesperson confirmed that he was undergoing radiation and hormone therapies for his prostate cancer. On October 20, Biden completed a course of radiation therapy at Penn Medicine Radiation Oncology at the University of Pennsylvania.

In August 2026, Hunter Biden said the cancer had "spread, metastasized into his bones and further" and was "very painful and [...] very debilitating in many respects". In September 2026, Biden announced that the radiation treatment he received for prostate cancer last fall "worked as intended" and that doctors helped in disease control.

== Political positions ==
As a senator, Biden was regarded as a moderate Democrat. As a presidential nominee, Biden's platform had been called the most progressive of any major party platform in history, although not within his party's ideological vanguard. Biden says his positions are deeply influenced by Catholic social teaching.

According to political scientist Carlo Invernizzi Accetti, Biden represents an Americanized form of Christian democracy, taking positions characteristic of both the center-right and center-left. Biden has cited the Catholic philosopher Jacques Maritain, credited with starting the Christian democratic movement, as immensely influential in his thinking. Other analysts have likened his ideology to traditional liberalism, "a doctrine of liberty, equality, justice and individual rights that relies... on a strong federal government for enforcement". In 2022, journalist Sasha Issenberg wrote that Biden's "most valuable political skill" was "an innate compass for the ever-shifting mainstream of the Democratic Party". Republican critics claimed Biden's climate policy was socialist.

Biden proposed partially reversing the corporate tax cuts of the Tax Cuts and Jobs Act of 2017. He voted for the North American Free Trade Agreement (NAFTA) and the Trans-Pacific Partnership. Biden is a staunch supporter of the Affordable Care Act (ACA). He promoted a plan to build upon it, aiming to expand health insurance coverage to 97% of Americans, including by creating a public health insurance option.

Biden did not support national same-sex marriage rights while in the Senate and voted for the Defense of Marriage Act, but opposed proposals for constitutional amendments that would have banned same-sex marriage nationwide. Biden has supported same-sex marriage since 2012. As a senator, Biden forged deep relationships with police groups and was a chief proponent of a Law Enforcement Officers' Bill of Rights measure that police unions supported but police chiefs opposed. In 2020, Biden also ran on decriminalizing cannabis, after advocating harsher penalties for drug use as a senator.

Biden believes action must be taken on climate change. As a senator, he co-sponsored the Boxer–Sanders Global Warming Pollution Reduction Act, the most stringent climate bill in the United States Senate. Biden supports nature conservation. According to a report from the Center for American Progress, he broke several records in this domain. He took steps to protect old-growth forests. Biden opposes drilling for oil in the Arctic National Wildlife Refuge. He wants to achieve a carbon-free power sector in the U.S. by 2035 and stop emissions completely by 2050. His program included reentering the Paris Agreement, green building and more. Biden supports environmental justice, including climate justice and ocean justice. (Note: Attributed to multiple sources:) Biden called global temperature rise above the 1.5°C limit the "only existential threat humanity faces even more frightening than a nuclear war". Despite his clean energy policies and congressional Republicans characterizing them as a "War on American Energy", domestic oil production reached a record high in October 2023.

Biden has said the U.S. needs to "get tough" on China, calling it the "most serious competitor" that poses challenges to the United States' "prosperity, security, and democratic values". Biden has spoken about human rights abuses in the Xinjiang region to Chinese leader Xi Jinping, pledging to sanction and commercially restrict Chinese government officials and entities who carry out repression. Biden has said he is against regime change but is for providing non-military support to opposition movements. He opposed direct U.S. intervention in Libya, voted against U.S. participation in the Gulf War, voted in favor of the Iraq War, and supports a two-state solution in the Israeli–Palestinian conflict. Biden pledged to end U.S. support for the Saudi Arabian-led intervention in Yemen and to reevaluate the United States' relationship with Saudi Arabia. Biden supported extending the New START arms control treaty with Russia to limit the number of nuclear weapons deployed by both sides. In 2021, Biden officially recognized the Armenian genocide, becoming the first U.S. president to do so. (Note: President Ronald Reagan referred to the Armenian genocide in passing in a 1981 statement on the Holocaust, but he never formally recognized it.)

Biden supported abortion rights throughout his presidency, though he personally opposes abortion because of his Catholic faith. In 2019, he said he supported Roe v. Wade and repealing the Hyde Amendment. After Dobbs v. Jackson Women's Health Organization, he criticized near-total bans on abortion access passed in a majority of Republican-controlled states, and took measures to protect abortion rights in the United States. Biden rejected calls to provide abortion services on federal land. He vowed to sign a bill codifying the protections of Roe into federal law; such a bill passed the House in 2022, but was unable to clear the Senate filibuster.

== Family ==
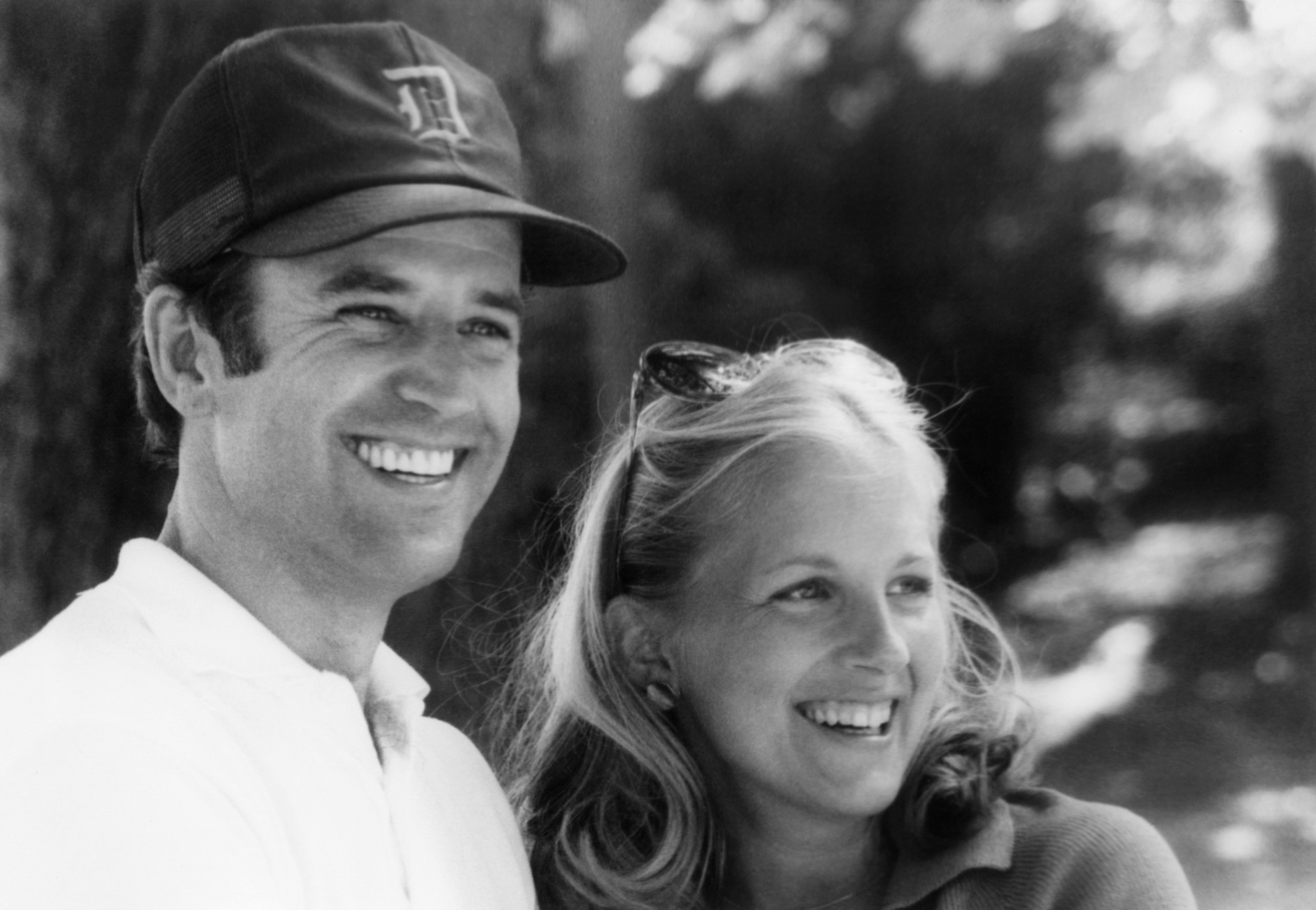
Biden and his second wife, Jill, met in 1975 and married in 1977.

Biden married Neilia Hunter, a student at Syracuse University, on August 27, 1966, after overcoming her parents' disinclination for her to wed a Catholic. Their wedding was held in a Catholic church in Skaneateles, New York. They had three children: Joseph R. "Beau" Biden III, Robert Hunter Biden, and Naomi Christina "Amy" Biden.

A few weeks after Biden was elected senator, his wife Neilia and one-year-old daughter Naomi were killed in an automobile accident in Hockessin, Delaware, on December 18, 1972. Their sons Beau (aged 3) and Hunter (aged 2) were in the car and were taken to hospital with non-life-threatening injuries. He considered resigning to care for them, but Senate Majority Leader Mike Mansfield persuaded him not to. Biden contemplated suicide and was filled with anger and religious doubt. He wrote that he "felt God had played a horrible trick" on him and had trouble focusing on work.

Biden met teacher Jill Tracy Jacobs in 1975 on a blind date. They married at the United Nations chapel in New York on June 17, 1977, and spent their honeymoon at Lake Balaton in the Hungarian People's Republic. Biden credits her with the renewal of his interest in politics and life.

In 1981, the couple had a daughter, Ashley Biden, who is a social worker, activist, and fashion designer. Jill helped raise her stepsons, Hunter and Beau, who were seven and eight respectively at the time of her marriage. Hunter has worked as a Washington lobbyist and investment adviser; his business dealings, personal life, and legal troubles came under significant scrutiny during his father's presidency. In December 2024, Biden pardoned Hunter following his conviction on gun and tax charges despite repeated promises that he would not do so. (Note: Attributed to multiple sources:) Beau became an Army judge-advocate in Iraq and later Delaware attorney general before dying of brain cancer in 2015.

== Public image ==
Biden was consistently ranked one of the least wealthy members of the Senate, which he attributed to having been elected young. Feeling that less-wealthy public officials may be tempted to accept contributions in exchange for political favors, he proposed campaign finance reform measures during his first term. While a senator, Biden was viewed as being close to the credit card company MBNA, a major contributor to his campaigns since 1989, sometimes being called the "senator from MBNA". As of November 2009, Biden's net worth was $27,012. By November 2020, the Bidens were worth $9 million, largely due to sales of Biden's books and speaking fees after his vice presidency.

Political columnist David S. Broder wrote that Biden has grown over time: "He responds to real people—that's been consistent throughout. And his ability to understand himself and deal with other politicians has gotten much, much better." Journalist James Traub has written that "Biden is the kind of fundamentally happy person who can be as generous toward others as he is to himself". Particularly since the 2015 death of his elder son Beau, Biden has been noted for his empathetic nature and ability to communicate about grief.

Journalist and TV anchor Wolf Blitzer has called Biden loquacious; journalist Mark Bowden has said that he is famous for "talking too much", leaning in close "like an old pal with something urgent to tell you". He often deviates from prepared remarks, and sometimes "puts his foot in his mouth". Biden has a reputation for being prone to gaffes. The New York Times wrote that Biden's "weak filters make him capable of blurting out pretty much anything".

According to The New York Times, Biden often embellishes elements of his life or exaggerates, a trait also noted by The New Yorker in 2014. For instance, he has claimed to have been more active in the civil rights movement than he actually was, and has falsely recalled being an excellent student who earned three college degrees. The Times wrote, "Mr. Biden's folksiness can veer into folklore, with dates that don't quite add up and details that are exaggerated or wrong, the factual edges shaved off to make them more powerful for audiences."

=== Job approval ===
According to Morning Consult polling, Biden maintained an approval rating above 50% during his presidency's first eight months. In August 2021, it began to decline, reaching the low forties by December. This was attributed to the Afghanistan withdrawal, increasing hospitalizations from the Delta variant, high inflation and gas prices, disarray within the Democratic Party, and a general decline in popularity customary in politics. (Note: Attributed to multiple sources:) In 2023, Biden's approval rating was the lowest of any modern (Note: The source defines "modern" presidents as all seven presidents before Biden, or presidents since 1979: Jimmy Carter, Ronald Reagan, George H. W. Bush, Bill Clinton, George W. Bush, Barack Obama, and Donald Trump.) U.S. president after three years in office.

Gallup, Inc. found Biden's approval ratings to be consistently above 50% during his first few months in office, but by August, his ratings began to decline. He had a 98% approval rating from Democrats in February 2021, but by December only 78% approved of his presidency. By October 2023, his rating among Democrats had reached a record low of 75%. His approval rating among Republicans has been consistently in the single digits, aside from his first few months in office.

Gallup also noted that Biden's public support eroded each year he was in office: he averaged 49% approval in his first year, 41% in his second, 40% in his third, and 39% in 2024. In July 2024, just before he withdrew from the presidential election, Gallup found his approval rating had fallen to an all-time low of 36%. Gallup found that Biden had an average approval rating of 42.2% throughout his presidency, lower than all other presidents' except Trump's in his first term, at 41.1%. Biden's approval rating in January 2025 was 40%, which was low but still higher than several other presidents' final approval ratings. Gallup's averaged polls of Biden's presidency found that he was the second-least popular president in its polling history, after Trump.

CNN and CBS News found Biden's final approval rating to be 37% and 36%, respectively. Polling aggregator FiveThirtyEight found that Biden had a final average approval rating of 37%.

=== Media depictions ===
Nine men have portrayed Biden on Saturday Night Live, starting with Kevin Nealon in 1991. Jason Sudeikis portrayed Biden during the 2008 election and reprised the role many times. During the 2020 election, Biden was played by John Mulaney, Alex Moffat, Mikey Day, Woody Harrelson, and Jim Carrey. In 2024, Dana Carvey played the role. In 2016, Greg Kinnear portrayed Biden in the HBO television film Confirmation, about the Clarence Thomas Supreme Court nomination hearings.

Biden appears in episodes of Parks and Recreation during his time as vice president. He appears as himself in a 2016 episode of Law & Order: SVU. The Onion ran a series of articles about a fictionalized Biden.

== Assessments ==
A December 2024 Gallup poll found that 54% of Americans thought Biden's presidency was below average or poor, 26% average, and 19% above average or outstanding. Gallup found that Americans largely offered negative assessments of Biden's presidency on economic, national, and international issues. Of 18 issue areas Gallup tracked, a majority of Americans said the U.S. lost ground in six, including the economy in general, immigration, and the country's position in the world. A plurality found that the U.S. declined in six other areas, including national infrastructure and energy, education, and trade relations with other countries. A plurality felt the U.S. made progress in only one indicator under Biden: the conditions of gay, lesbian, and transgender people.

When Biden left office in 2025, journalists and many Democrats viewed his presidency as a failure due to age and health concerns, public frustration over inflation, and Harris's loss to Trump in the 2024 presidential election. The Guardian called the conclusion of Biden's presidency a "tragedy".

=== Historical assessments ===
Journalist Amy Walter, editor of the nonpartisan The Cook Political Report, argued that the public deemed Biden's presidency a failure particularly due to frustration over inflation. Economists debate the extent to which Biden's policies were responsible for inflation, but according to Gallup, public perception of the economy in 2024 was worse only in 2008 and 1992, helping Trump win the 2024 presidential election.

The Siena College Research Institute's 2022 survey ranked Biden 19th out of 45 presidents. The 2024 Presidential Greatness Project Expert survey ranked Biden 14th. A February 2024 American Political Science Association poll of historians and scholars also ranked Biden the 14th-greatest president, diverging from public assessments. The pollsters noted that Biden's ranking was unusually high for a presidency without military victories or institutional expansion.

In 2026, historian Julian E. Zelizer described Biden's presidency as similar to those of George H. W. Bush and Jimmy Carter, who were elected to office on a platform of change but served only one term.

== See also ==
- Bibliography of Joe Biden
- Electoral history of Joe Biden
- List of presidents of the United States
- List of presidents of the United States by previous experience
- List of presidents of the United States who were Freemasons
- List of things named after Joe Biden

== Notes ==
Party political offices
Preceded by James M. Tunnell Jr.	Democratic nominee for U.S. Senator from Delaware (Class 2); 1972, 1978, 1984, 1990, 1996, 2002, 2008	Succeeded by Chris Coons
Preceded by John Edwards	Democratic nominee for Vice President of the United States; 2008, 2012	Succeeded by Tim Kaine
Preceded by Hillary Clinton	Democratic nominee for President of the United States; 2020	Succeeded by Kamala Harris
U.S. Senate
Preceded by J. Caleb Boggs	United States Senator (Class 2) from Delaware; 1973–2009; Served alongside: William Roth, Tom Carper	Succeeded by Ted Kaufman
Preceded by Strom Thurmond; Orrin Hatch	Ranking Member of the Senate Judiciary Committee; 1981–1987; 1995–1997	Succeeded by Strom Thurmond; Patrick Leahy
Preceded by New office Chuck Grassley; Chuck Grassley	Ranking Member of the Senate Narcotics Caucus; 1985–1987; 1995–2001; 2003–2007	Succeeded by Chuck Grassley; Chuck Grassley; Dianne Feinstein
Preceded by Strom Thurmond	Chair of the Senate Judiciary Committee; 1987–1995	Succeeded by Orrin Hatch
Preceded by Chuck Grassley; Chuck Grassley; Chuck Grassley	Chair of the Senate Narcotics Caucus; 1987–1995; 2001–2003; 2007–2009	Succeeded by Chuck Grassley; Chuck Grassley; Dianne Feinstein
Preceded by Claiborne Pell; Jesse Helms	Ranking Member of the Senate Foreign Relations Committee; 1997–2001; 2003–2007	Succeeded by Jesse Helms; Richard Lugar
Preceded by Jesse Helms; Richard Lugar	Chair of the Senate Foreign Relations Committee; 2001–2003; 2007–2009	Succeeded by Richard Lugar; John Kerry
Honorary titles
Preceded by John V. Tunney	Baby of the United States Senate; 1973–1979	Succeeded by Bill Bradley
Political offices
Preceded by Dick Cheney	Vice President of the United States; 2009–2017	Succeeded by Mike Pence
Preceded by Donald Trump	President of the United States; 2021–2025	Succeeded by Donald Trump
U.S. order of precedence (ceremonial)
Preceded by Barack Obama as Former president	Order of precedence of the United States; Former President	Succeeded by Dan Quayle as Former Vice president
