= List of awards and honors received by Joe Biden =

Comprehensive list of President Joe Biden's awards and honors

Joe Biden, the 46th president of the United States, has received numerous honors in recognition of his career in politics.

These include:

== National honors ==
Country	Date	Decoration	Ribbon bar	Post-nominal letters
United States	12 January 2017	Presidential Medal of Freedom with Distinction		
United States	16 January 2025	Department of Defense Medal for Distinguished Public Service		

== Foreign honors ==
Country	Date	Decoration	Ribbon bar	Post-nominal letters
Estonia	5 February 2004	Order of the Cross of Terra Mariana (1st Class)		
Pakistan	28 October 2008	Crescent of Pakistan		
Kosovo	21 May 2009	Golden Medal of Freedom		
Georgia	22 July 2009	St. George's Order of Victory		
Latvia	1 April 2011	Order of the Three Stars (1st Class)		
Colombia	17 November 2016	Order of Boyaca (Extraordinary Grand Cross)		ODB
Ukraine	17 January 2017	Member of the Order of Liberty		MOL
Montenegro	22 March 2018	National Order of the Montenegrin Great Star, First Class		
Israel	14 July 2022	Israeli Presidential Medal of Honour		
Ukraine	22 December 2022	Cross of Military Merit		
Lithuania	11 July 2023	Order of Vytautas the Great with the Golden Chain		
Germany	18 October 2024	Order of Merit of the Federal Republic of Germany (Grand Cross Special Class)		

== Scholastic ==
=== Chancellor, visitor, governor, rector and fellowships ===
Location	Date	School	Position
Connecticut	1975 – 1976	Timothy Dwight College at Yale University	Chubb Fellow
Delaware	1991 – 2008	Widener University Delaware Law School	Adjunct Professor
Pennsylvania	7 February 2017 – present	University of Pennsylvania	Benjamin Franklin Presidential Practice Professor: On leave as of 25 April 2019
Pennsylvania	7 February 2017 – present	Andrea Mitchell Center for the Study of Democracy at the University of Pennsylvania	Senior Fellow: On leave as of 25 April 2019

=== Honorary degrees ===
Location	Date	School	Degree	Gave commencement address
Pennsylvania	1979	University of Scranton	Doctorate	Yes
Pennsylvania	1981	Saint Joseph's University	Doctor of Laws (LLD)	No
Delaware	May 2000	Widener University Delaware Law School	Doctorate	
Delaware	7 May 2003	Delaware State University	Doctor of Humane Letters (DHL)	Yes
Massachusetts	19 May 2003	Emerson College	Doctor of Humane Letters (DHL)	Yes
Delaware	29 May 2004	University of Delaware	Doctor of Laws (LLD)	Yes
Massachusetts	23 May 2005	Suffolk University Law School	Doctorate	Yes
New York	10 May 2009	Syracuse University	Doctor of Laws (LLD)	Yes
North Carolina	18 May 2009	Wake Forest University	Doctor of Laws (LLD)	Yes
Pennsylvania	13 May 2013	University of Pennsylvania	Doctor of Laws (LLD)	Yes
Florida	3 May 2014	Miami Dade College	Doctorate	Yes
South Carolina	9 May 2014	University of South Carolina	Doctor of Public Administration (DPA)	Yes
Ireland	24 June 2016	Trinity College Dublin	Doctor of Laws (LLD)	Yes
Maryland	20 May 2017	Morgan State University	Doctor of Public Service (DPS)	Yes
Maine	21 May 2017	Colby College	Doctor of Laws (LLD)	Yes
South Carolina	17 December 2021	South Carolina State University	Doctor of Humane Letters (DHL)	Yes
District of Columbia	13 May 2023	Howard University	Doctor of Letters (DLitt)	Yes
Georgia (U.S. state)	19 May 2024	Morehouse College	Doctor of Laws (LLD)	Yes

== Awards ==
Location	Date	Institution	Award
New York	26 April 1992	Ellis Island Honors Society	Ellis Island Medal of Honor
Georgia (U.S. state)	2005	Men Stopping Violence	True Ally Award
District of Columbia	26 October 2009	National Law Enforcement Officers Memorial Fund	National Law Enforcement Officers Memorial Fund's Distinguished Service Award
Maryland	23 November 2009	American Speech–Language–Hearing Association	Annie Glenn Award
District of Columbia	3 May 2011	Atlantic Council	Distinguished International Leadership Award
New York	21 March 2013	Irish America Magazine	Irish America Hall of Fame Inductee
Maryland	2015	Patient Safety Movement Foundation	Humanitarian Award: Awarded with Barack Obama
New York	17 October 2015	Archons of the Ecumenical Patriarchate	Patriarch Athenagoras Humanitarian Award
Indiana	15 May 2016	University of Notre Dame	Laetare Medal: Awarded with John Boehner
Pennsylvania	7 June 2016	Allegheny College	Allegheny College Prize for Civility in Public Life: Awarded with John S. McCain III
Ireland	24 June 2016	Philosophical Society of Trinity College Dublin	Gold Medal of Honorary Patronage
District of Columbia	6 December 2016	Robert F. Kennedy Center for Justice and Human Rights	Robert F. Kennedy Human Rights Ripple of Hope Award: Awarded with Howard Schultz and Scott Minerd
District of Columbia	1 March 2017	Bipartisan Policy Center	Congressional Patriot Award
New York	16 March 2017	HELP USA	HELP HERO Humanitarian Award
District of Columbia	5 October 2017	Center for Strategic and International Studies	Zbigniew Brzezinski Annual Prize
New York	11 October 2017	New York City Anti-Violence Project	Courage Award
New York	3 November 2017	United Nations Association of New York	United Nations Day Humanitarian of the Year Award
District of Columbia	10 December 2017	American Society of Hematology	ASH Public Service Award
Delaware	8 January 2018	Delaware State Chamber of Commerce	Josiah Marvel Cup Award: Awarded with Jill Biden
Delaware	14 April 2018	PNC Bank	Common Wealth Award of Distinguished Service: Awarded with Ronald Chernow and Henry Louis Gates Jr.
District of Columbia	23 May 2018	Freedom House	Freedom House Human Rights Award: Awarded with Robert Corker, Elena Milashina and Igor Kochetkov
Ohio	11 July 2018	John Glenn College of Public Affairs at Ohio State University	Excellence in Public Service Award
Tennessee	17 October 2018	National Civil Rights Museum	Hyde Family Foundation Award
District of Columbia	29 November 2018	Lombardi Comprehensive Cancer Center at Georgetown University	Luminary Leadership Award
District of Columbia	9 April 2019	National Minority Quality Forum	Lifetime Achievement Award
New York	10 December 2020	TIME Magazine	Time Person of the Year: Awarded with Kamala Harris
Michigan	19 May 2024	NAACP	Lifetime Achievement Award
Massachusetts	26 October 2025	Edward M. Kennedy Institute for the United States Senate	Lifetime Achievement Award
District of Columbia	5 December 2025	LGBTQ+ Victory Institute	Chris Abele Impact Award

== Freedom of the City ==
- (Republic of Ireland) 25 June 2016: County Louth
