= Impeachment inquiry into Joe Biden =

2023 US investigation of president

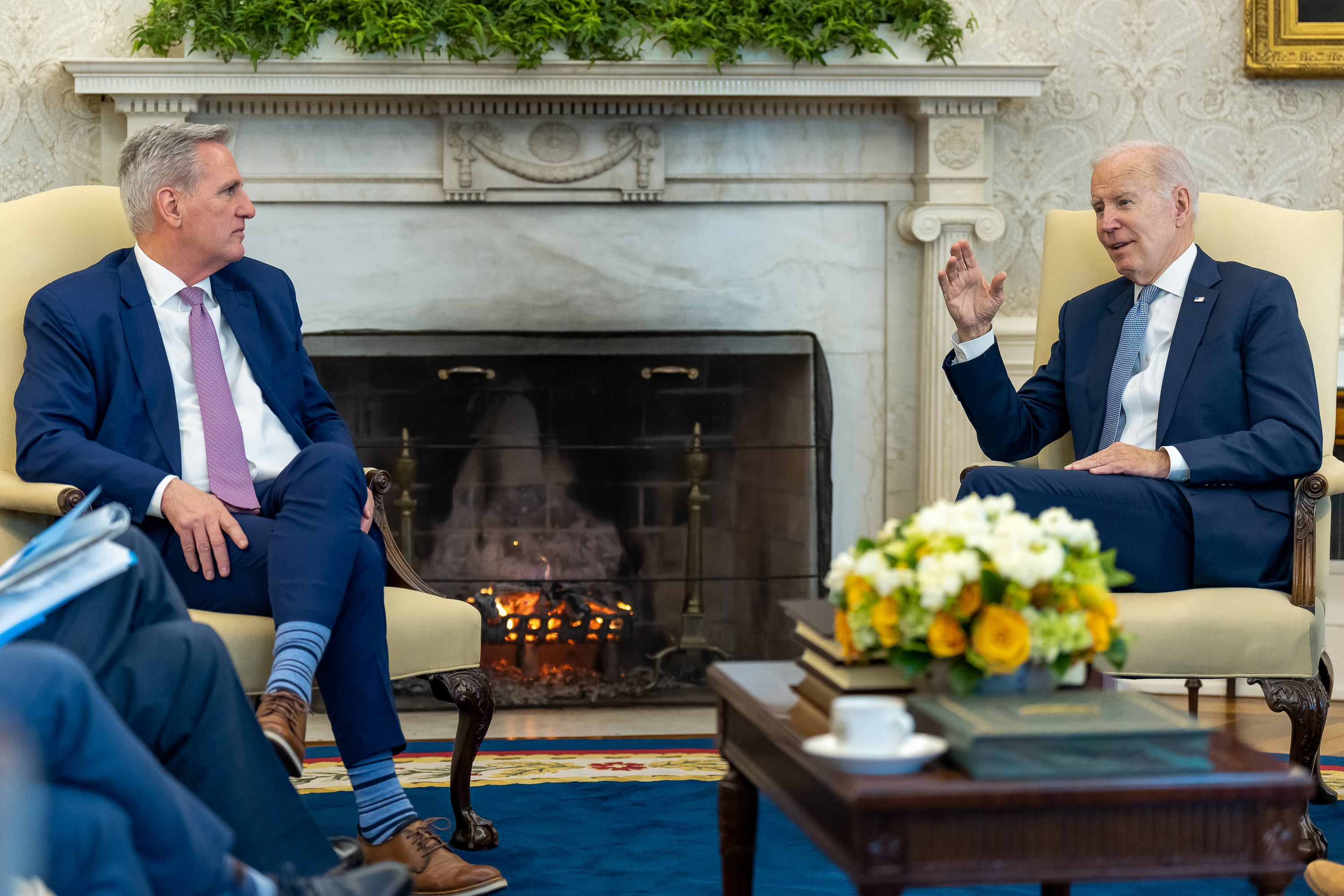
- President Biden meeting with then–Speaker of the House, Kevin McCarthy, February 1, 2023
- Accused: Joe Biden, 46th President of the United States
- Proponents: Kevin McCarthy (Speaker of the House of Representatives until October 3, 2023); Mike Johnson (Speaker of the House of Representatives beginning October 25, 2023)
- Lead official: James Comer
- Committees: Oversight; Judiciary; Ways and Means
- Committee chairs: James Comer (Oversight); Jim Jordan (Judiciary); Jason Smith (Ways and Means)
- Date: September 12, 2023 – August 19, 2024 (11 months, 1 week and 1 day)
- Outcome: Report released alleging "impeachable conduct", but not recommending any articles of impeachment
- Cause: Allegations that Joe Biden financially benefited from business dealings with his son, Hunter Biden; Allegations that Hunter was given preferential treatment during a federal investigation; Allegations that Biden was guilty of corruption, abuse of power, obstruction

On September 12, 2023, Kevin McCarthy, speaker of the United States House of Representatives, announced an impeachment inquiry into President Joe Biden. The inquiry was conducted by the House's Judiciary, Oversight and Ways and Means committees. James Comer, chairman of the Oversight Committee, was named to lead the investigation.

Speaker McCarthy had twelve days earlier said an inquiry would require a majority House vote. He initiated the inquiry stating that recent House investigations "paint a picture of corruption" by Biden and his family. No congressional investigations had yet discovered any evidence of wrongdoing by Joe Biden himself. (Note: Attributed to multiple references:) The inquiry held a public hearing on September 28, 2023.

Despite neither the earlier Comer committee investigation nor the impeachment inquiry finding evidence of wrongdoing by the president, on December 13, 2023, majority House Republicans unanimously approved a resolution to formalize the inquiry. Democrats unanimously voted against the resolution. Lacking evidence and Republican appetite to proceed to impeachment hearings with their thin House majority, by March 2024 the impeachment inquiry was winding down. The three investigating committees released a nearly 300-page report on August 19, 2024, alleging "impeachable conduct" but did not recommend specific articles of impeachment, focusing primarily on the activities of the president's son Hunter and his associates, and the president's brother, James Biden.

On February 15, 2024, the FBI arrested and charged Alexander Smirnov, who was the central figure in bribery allegations against Biden, for lying to investigators and fabricating an uncorroborated story to damage Biden's reelection campaign, and that "officials associated with Russian intelligence were involved" in manufacturing the story. In December 2024, Smirnov pled guilty.

== Background ==
Since 2020, Republicans have advocated for investigations into the business dealings of Joe Biden's son, Hunter Biden, who they alleged engaged in corrupt activities including influence-peddling, and shared money with his father. They have sought to directly connect Hunter's financial affairs to Joe, and demonstrate that Joe benefited from Hunter's business dealings. A specific allegation that Joe sought to protect Hunter from a corruption investigation by arranging to have the Ukrainian prosecutor general Viktor Shokin fired has been repeatedly shown to be false. They have also accused the Department of Justice of interfering in a federal investigation into Hunter, which has been ongoing since 2018, to give him preferential treatment. Congressional Republicans have launched multiple committee investigations to look into these allegations, including the House Oversight Committee investigation into the Biden family. By the time of the impeachment inquiry, these investigations had not produced evidence of wrongdoing by the president. (Note: Attributed to multiple references:) Over the course of the committee investigations, McCarthy alleged that the Biden administration engaged in "obstruction", although Oversight Committee chair James Comer said on Fox Business in June 2023, that for every subpoena he had issued during his investigation, "we've gotten 100 percent of what we requested, whether it's with the FBI or with banks or with Treasury."

Former president Donald Trump, as well as some Republican members of the House of Representatives and Senate, have expressed a desire to retaliate against the impeachments of Trump by beginning an impeachment inquiry of Biden. (Note: Attributed to multiple references:) Following Joe Biden's inauguration, various Republican members of Congress have engaged in several efforts to impeach him. The first of these efforts occurred when articles of impeachment citing the Biden–Ukraine conspiracy theory were filed by Congresswoman Marjorie Taylor Greene one day after Biden's inauguration. In the 118th Congress, Republicans were able to hold a majority in the House of Representatives, comprising several members of the Freedom Caucus. Kevin McCarthy, leader of the House Republican Conference, was elected speaker of the House after several days and many votes as opposition—primarily led by members of the Freedom Caucus—mounted against him; as part of negotiations, McCarthy conceded to his opponents and faced pressure from Republican members to either impeach Biden or launch an impeachment inquiry against him. The Fiscal Responsibility Act, an act drafted to resolve the 2023 United States debt-ceiling crisis, weakened McCarthy's standing with members of the Freedom Caucus who opposed his negotiations with Biden.

In June 2023, the House of Representatives voted to begin an investigation into Biden's removal and referred two impeachment articles written by Lauren Boebert to committee. McCarthy privately told his members that he would consider impeachment if the Oversight Committee investigation produced sufficient evidence. Trump has privately and publicly encouraged impeaching Biden. On Truth Social, he lambasted Democrats for impeaching him amid the Trump–Ukraine scandal. Leading up to the inquiry, Trump met with House Republican Conference chair Elise Stefanik and Greene, discussing impeaching Biden both times.

== Initiation of the inquiry ==
Announcement by Kevin McCarthy of formal impeachment inquiry, September 12, 2023

In an early September interview with Breitbart News, Kevin McCarthy promised that he would only open an impeachment inquiry into Biden with a full House vote. On September 12, 2023, McCarthy directed three House committees—the Judiciary Committee, chaired by Jim Jordan, the Oversight Committee, chaired by Comer, and the Ways and Means Committee, chaired by Jason Smith—to hold a formal impeachment inquiry into Joe Biden. McCarthy did not hold a floor vote on the impeachment inquiry and he did not appear to have sufficient Republican support to pass a floor vote. The chairmen of all three committees had been involved in preceding investigations into the Biden family. McCarthy asked Comer to lead the inquiry. When announcing the inquiry, McCarthy said that earlier findings of House investigations "paint a picture of corruption" involving Biden and his relatives, particularly regarding the business dealings of Hunter.

McCarthy alleged that Joe Biden used his official office as vice president to coordinate with Hunter's business contacts and noted that Joe Biden was aware of Hunter's business dealings. He also brought up allegations that Joe Biden benefitted from Hunter's foreign business dealings. McCarthy argued that the Oversight Committee investigation demonstrated and warranted further investigation by the House of Representatives and that an impeachment inquiry would allow for a stronger investigation. McCarthy concluded the allegations by saying that Biden's family was given "special treatment" by the Biden administration despite these "serious allegations."

According to McCarthy, the impeachment inquiry would give House Republicans "the full power to gather all the facts and answers for the American public". Traditionally, congressional committees are given more sweeping authority to issue and enforce subpoenas when done so as part of an impeachment inquiry. McCarthy has drawn parallels between the Biden and Nixon administrations, accusing the Biden administration of using "government much like Richard Nixon by denying us to get the information that we need".

Despite claiming that he would hold a vote, McCarthy opened the inquiry independently. McCarthy has defended this reversal, saying that then-speaker Nancy Pelosi "changed the precedent" in launching an impeachment inquiry into Trump in 2019, when Pelosi announced an impeachment inquiry a month before a floor vote was eventually held to approve it. During the 2019 impeachment inquiry against Trump, McCarthy had asserted that he believed that an authorizing vote must be held in order for there to be a legitimate impeachment inquiry.

On December 13, 2023, the House of Representatives voted 221–212 to formalize the inquiry. Lawmakers voted along party lines to back a resolution that Republicans say will give them more power to gather evidence and enforce legal demands. The investigation, which began in January 2023 and was recently formalized, has yet to provide evidence Biden committed any high crimes or misdemeanors.

== House committee investigations ==
The House Oversight Committee plans to focus on the Biden family and their finances, the House Judiciary Committee on alleged coverups, and the House Ways and Means Committee on tax sensitive information.

Comer said that House Oversight investigators would seek additional emails dating back to the Obama administration and witness testimony from people alleging misconduct by the Biden family. The Oversight Committee also plans to pursue bank records for Hunter and James Biden, Joe Biden's brother. The Oversight Committee's ranking member, Jamie Raskin, who was lead manager during Donald Trump's second impeachment trial, has referred to the GOP investigation as a "complete and total bust." The House Oversight Committee officially held its first hearing on September 28.

Jordan said that the House Judiciary Committee planned to subpoena lawyers in the Justice Department's tax division who worked on the Weiss special counsel investigation into Hunter, headed by United States Attorney David Weiss. The ranking member, Jerrold Nadler, called the impeachment inquiry "absurd," and said that it was "poisoning our vital oversight work."

The Comer committee issued a subpoena for Hunter's bank records on September 25, finding he received two wire transfers from Chinese nationals in summer 2019 that listed his father's Delaware home as the beneficiary address. Comer said, "Joe Biden's abuse of public office for his family's financial gain threatens our national security. What did the Bidens do with this money from Beijing?" Hunter's attorney Abbe Lowell asserted the wires were loans from a Chinese company in which Biden had invested in 2017, and he used his equity in the investment as security for the loans. Lowell said the money went into "his new bank account which listed the address on his driver's license, his parents' address, because it was his only permanent address at the time."

Smith held a press conference on September 27 to discuss allegations of Biden influence peddling and a two-tiered justice system. Smith alleged that Hunter sent a WhatsApp message in June 2017, telling a business associate that he said he was not willing to "sign over my family's brand." Smith said it was clear that Hunter was referring to "Vice President Joe Biden's political power and influence." Joe's term as vice president had ended months earlier, but Smith said Biden was a presidential candidate at that time; Joe announced his candidacy in April 2019. Smith also discussed an email from a Weiss deputy telling investigators to remove all references to Joe Biden as "political figure one" from a search warrant for Hunter. When a reporter mentioned the email was sent in August 2020, when Trump was president, Smith suggested that was inconsequential to the underlying allegation of a two-tiered justice system. When pressed on the timelines of his comments, Smith said he was "not an expert on the timeline" but would like the Bidens to "tell us about all the timelines."

On September 28, the House Oversight Committee held the first hearing of the inquiry. Comer said in his opening statement that investigators had "uncovered a mountain of evidence" and alleged Biden used his official government role for his family's financial gain, but committee members did not present clear evidence to support the allegation. Three expert witnesses called by committee Republicans testified there was not impeachable evidence against Biden at that point. Committee Republicans made several false or misleading statements during the hearing. Nancy Mace falsely stated, "We already know the president took bribes from Burisma." Jim Jordan falsely said Hunter had acknowledged he was unqualified to sit on the Burisma board, though Biden had said "I was completely qualified to be on the board" in a 2019 interview, but added he probably would not have been hired if not for his surname. Jordan also misled by suggesting the Justice Department improperly blocked investigators from examining Joe Biden. A Trump-era Justice Department prosecutor had directed that references to Joe Biden be removed from a search warrant for Hunter, explaining there was no legal basis to reference Joe Biden in the warrant. Byron Donalds presented a text message from James Biden to suggest that his brother Joe Biden would help in Hunter's business matters, though preceding texts showed the discussion related to the younger Biden's alimony payments and other personal expenses. Pat Fallon asserted "Hunter admitted that he talked to his dad about business, specifically Burisma," referencing a 2019 New Yorker interview. In 2015, an Obama administration special envoy to Ukraine raised the issue of Hunter sitting on the Burisma board with the vice president. Hunter recounted in that 2019 interview that "Dad said, 'I hope you know what you're doing,' and I said, 'I do'".

While McCarthy was ousted as speaker on October 3, McCarthy's successor Mike Johnson (elected on October 25) confirmed in an October 27 Fox News interview with Sean Hannity that the inquiry will continue. The previous month, Johnson had previously expressed support for the impeachment inquiry after it was announced, claiming then that he believed there to already be enough justification to impeach Biden. However, in his October 27 Fox News interview, Johnson took a different tone on his current judgement of guilt, claiming, "we've not predetermined the outcome of this. We've not prejudged it."

Comer discussed the impeachment inquiry into Joe Biden in late October 2023, stating that "because we have so many documents, and we can bring these people in for [private] depositions or [public] committee hearings, whichever they choose". After Biden's son Hunter was subpoenaed in November to testify, Hunter preferred to testify publicly instead of privately, to avoid misrepresentations of the proceedings, stated Hunter's lawyer; Comer responded that the subpoenas for a December 2023 private deposition were "not mere suggestions open to [Hunter] Biden's interpretation or preference".

On November 7, 2023, Weiss testified before the House Judiciary Committee, the first time a special counsel had testified before Congress during a probe. Weiss stated that he was the "decision-maker" in his investigation of Hunter, and that "other United States Attorneys, the Tax Division or anyone else at the Department of Justice" had not interfered in the case.

The Washington Post reported that during a November 7 luncheon with the Republican Governance Group, Speaker Johnson indicated there was insufficient evidence to initiate formal impeachment proceedings. Johnson said on December 2 that he believed he had enough House votes to continue to impeachment proceedings, as Republicans said a vote might be held within days, though they acknowledged they had not found evidence of misconduct by the president.

On January 18, 2024, Hunter Biden agreed to attend a deposition with the House Oversight Committee at the end of February. Hunter and his legal team previously made two separate appearances at the U.S. Capitol since the subpoena was first issued in November 2023, requesting that the deposition take place in a public setting.

By April 24, 2024, Comer admitted to colleagues that the inquiry had run its course. With the narrow majority, looming election, and inconclusive evidence, it was expected bringing an impeachment to a floor vote would not succeed. However a House Oversight Committee spokesperson stated that the impeachment inquiry is ongoing and impeachment is 100% still on the table.

In May 2024, Rep. Cory Mills met with speaker Mike Johnson to discuss an impeachment resolution. This resolution accused Joe Biden of an "abuse of power" by engaging in a quid pro quo when he threatened to withhold weapons shipments to Israel in order to get Israeli Prime Minister Benjamin Netanyahu to not launch an attack on the Gaza city of Rafah. Mills compared Biden's action with Trump's when Trump in 2019 unsuccessfully tried to pressure Volodymyr Zelenskyy into investigating Biden and his family and to promote a discredited conspiracy theory that Ukraine–not Russia–was behind interference in the 2016 presidential election. This resulted in Trump's first impeachment. "Others say there is a distinct difference between Biden's motivation − steering policy − and Trump's, which they say was [for] personal and political gain."

On August 19, 2024, House Republicans released a report which accused "Biden of participating in a conspiracy to help his relatives receive millions of dollars from foreign interests" The release of the report overlapped with the first day of the 2024 Democratic National Convention.

== Witness credibility ==
=== Alexander Smirnov ===
In October 2022, Iowa Senator Chuck Grassley began asking the FBI for information about a source he believed they had interviewed in 2020. Grassley had heard that the source had claimed to have spoken to a Ukrainian oligarch who claimed to have bribed Joe Biden. On May 3, 2023, Republicans subpoenaed the Justice Department for a copy of the form on which the informational tip had been documented. The Justice Department replied that the form "establish[es] little beyond the fact that a confidential human source provided information and the FBI recorded it", warned them that the allegation might not be true and that many interviewees provide unreliable information to the FBI, and reminded them that it is normal "for law enforcement agencies to decline to confirm or deny" potential evidence in ongoing investigations. Grassley obtained the FBI form and posted it to his website, claiming he was pressuring the FBI to further investigate the claim and be transparent with the public.

On February 15, 2024, the DOJ announced that Alexander Smirnov, the informant in question, was being charged with making a false statement and creating a false record. In a February 20 court filing, prosecutors said Smirnov had admitted that Russian intelligence officials had passed a story about Hunter Biden to him. That same day, House Republicans sent two copies of an interview request letter to former State Department official Amos Hochstein, the first with a paragraph citing Smirnov's allegations as the basis for their investigation, followed by a revised version without that paragraph. Though Smirnov had been released on bond, on February 22, he was taken into custody.

== Responses ==
=== Republican reaction ===
Comer and Jordan expressed support for the impeachment inquiry's potential to provide them with expanded investigative powers, with Jordan saying that it would ramp up "the pace at which we're going to try to get information from the executive branch", as courts may provide more support for investigators' demands for information. Jordan has also said that a vote on the inquiry would be helpful in giving weight to the significance of the impeachment inquiry.

At the time it was announced, there was a divide among Republican congressmen in their attitudes toward the inquiry. After the inquiry was announced, multiple Republican members of Congress expressed support for the inquiry, indicating that they believed there to be substantial enough grounds to launch one. This included House members Mike Garcia, Nick LaLota, Tony Gonzales, and Senators John Cornyn and Mike Lee. (Note: Attributed to multiple references:) Some Republican members of Congress who had previously publicly urged against launching an inquiry adopted a pro-inquiry stance following the inquiry's initiation. Many Republicans in the more electorally competitive swing districts of the House of Representatives voiced support for the launch of the inquiry. Contrarily, multiple Republican members of Congress voiced concerns after the launch of the inquiry. A number, including House members Ken Buck, David Joyce, Don Bacon, and Senator Shelley Capito, commented that they had not seen evidence to warrant an impeachment inquiry. In a Washington Post opinion piece, Buck—a member of the deeply conservative House Freedom Caucus—wrote that his fellow House Republicans "who are itching for an impeachment are relying on an imagined history," specifically refuting their allegations that Biden acted improperly regarding the firing of Ukrainian prosecutor general Viktor Shokin. However, some members who have raised concerns about the lack of available evidence still support holding an impeachment inquiry to allow for a complete evidentiary record, including House members Dusty Johnson and French Hill and Senator Mitt Romney. Other Republican members of Congress, such as House members Brian Fitzpatrick, George Santos, Senators Lisa Murkowski, Thom Tillis, and Marco Rubio, have expressed concerns about "cheapening" and lowering the bar for impeachment. (Note: Attributed to multiple references:) Matt Gaetz referred to the impeachment inquiry as "failure theatre".

Trump said that the impeachment inquiry was potentially motivated by revenge on his behalf, stating that if he hadn't been impeached, "perhaps you wouldn't have it being done to them".

Freedom Caucus members Matt Gaetz and Matt Rosendale denounced the impeachment effort as a political stunt in September. During an invitation-only video conference, Gaetz said, "I don't believe that we are endeavoring upon a legitimate impeachment of Joe Biden ... I think it's for the sake of having another bad thing to say about Joe Biden."

=== Democratic reaction ===
Biden responded to the impeachment inquiry by stating, "Well, I tell you what, I don't know quite why, but they just knew they wanted to impeach me. And now, the best I can tell, they want to impeach me because they want to shut down the government". He then stated that he was not focused on impeachment and said, "I've got to deal with the issues that affect the American people every single solitary day". The White House also sent a memo to U.S. news organizations, calling on them to "scrutinize House Republicans' demonstrably false claims" and disputing allegations of misconduct.

House Minority Leader Hakeem Jeffries vowed to defend Biden "until the very end" and compared the impeachment inquiry to a kangaroo court.

Senate Majority Leader Chuck Schumer criticized McCarthy for bowing to conservative pressure and labeled the impeachment inquiry as a witch hunt.

=== Reaction from academics ===
At the launch of the impeachment inquiry, both University of Missouri School of Law professor emeritus Frank Bowman, Columbia Law School professor Philip Bobbitt (both of whom have authored texts on impeachment), as well as University of North Carolina School of Law professor and constitutional law expert Michael Gerhardt, commented that they had not seen anything they would consider to be evidence against Biden. They all consider this inquiry to be a departure from past presidential impeachment inquiries, which they say were preceded by significant evidence of wrongdoing by the president. Both Bowman and Bobbitt expressed concern that the inquiry will cheapen the concept of impeachment, thereby damaging the federal government's checks and balances. Calling the impeachment inquiry "absolutely shocking", Bowman remarked that the Republicans behind the impeachment effort, "have no interest at all in preserving the basic integrity of the process, or indeed their own power as legislators in legitimate opposition and tension with the executive branch." Gerhardt called the launch of an inquiry "an outcome in search of a process." Gerhardt would later be called by Democrats as an expert witness during the opening hearing of the inquiry.

Upon the launch of the inquiry, George Washington University Law School professor and constitutional law expert Jonathan Turley said "the suggestion that [existing evidence] does not meet the standard for an inquiry into impeachable offenses is an example of willful blindness". Turley was later called on by Republican members of Congress to testify as a witness during the first impeachment inquiry hearing, where he also stated that Congress had failed to connect Hunter's alleged influence peddling to President Biden. He also stated that some of the details they had gathered "really do gravitate in favor of the president". Turley had previously been a witness during the 2019 impeachment inquiry against Trump, having been called to provide expert testimony on behalf of Trump's defense, as well as a witness in the impeachment of Bill Clinton, testifying in favor of impeaching Clinton.

== Analysis ==
The initiation of the impeachment inquiry was seen by numerous Republican members of Congress and political analysts as potentially being an effort by McCarthy to satisfy hardline right-wing members of the House's narrow Republican majority and avoid a motion to vacate the speakership. It came amid tenuous negotiations McCarthy was having with his caucus ahead of the fiscal year deadline to pass appropriations bills and avert a government shutdown. Far-right members of Congress openly tied impeachment demands to other legislative priorities or threatening to vacate the speakership. In late August, Greene stated, "I will not vote to fund the government unless we have passed an impeachment inquiry." In September, Gaetz said Republicans should be "forcing votes on impeachment. And if Speaker McCarthy stands in our way, he may not have the job long". (Note: Attributed to multiple references:) Within a day of the inquiry announcement, several far-right members of the House had declared that McCarthy's launching of an impeachment inquiry had not placated them into dropping their demands related to the budget or affected their attitudes on a motion to vacate.

During his September 12 announcement of the initiation of the inquiry, McCarthy made several claims to justify initiating the inquiry. He said "a trusted FBI informant has alleged a bribe to the Biden family," though the informant merely relayed information to the FBI that the CEO of Burisma had alleged, and the informant could not vouch for the veracity of the allegation. McCarthy said that bank records showed that "nearly $20 million in payments were directed to the Biden family members and associates through various shell companies," and "more than 150 transactions involving the Biden family and other business associates were flagged as suspicious activity by US banks," though Joe Biden himself was never implicated in the payments and the existence of suspicious activity reports does not alone establish wrongdoing. McCarthy also stated that "eyewitnesses have testified that the president joined on multiple phone calls and had multiple interactions, dinners [that] resulted in cars and millions of dollars into his son's and his son's business partner's" accounts. However, one of Hunter's business associates denied that Joe was engaged in business-related discussions.

=== Legal standing ===
The House of Representatives is not legally obligated to start an impeachment inquiry with a vote on the House floor, as it is not required under either the Constitution or House rules. However, the Office of Legal Counsel in the Department of Justice ruled in January 2020 that impeachment inquiries are valid only if authorized by the full House, following the impromptu impeachment inquiry against Donald Trump. The opinion remains binding on the Department of Justice, Federal Bureau of Investigation, Internal Revenue Service, as all are part of the executive branch. It also binds future presidential administrations unless revoked or superseded. The opinion finds that without a floor vote, subpoenas issued by House committees would lack the weight normally granted when pertaining to an impeachment inquiry. This was relevant in the initial period of the investigation, before a floor vote was held.

== Opinion polling ==
=== Support for inquiry ===
Support for the impeachment inquiry
Poll source	Poll sponsor	Date(s) administered	Sample size	Margin of error	Support (Note: These polls are color-coded relative to the margin of error (×2 for spread). If the poll is within the doubled margin of error, both colors are used. If the margin of error is, for example, 2.5, then the spread would be 5, so a 50% support / 45% oppose would be tied.)	Oppose	Undecided
Marist Poll	PBS and NPR	Sep. 25–28, 2023	1,137 registered voters	± 3.7	47%	51%	2%
Hart Research Associates/ Public Opinion Strategies	NBC News	Sep. 15–19, 2023	1,000 registered voters	± 3.1	39%	56%	5%

Support for the opening of the impeachment inquiry
Poll source	Poll sponsor	Date(s) administered	Sample size	Margin of error	Support	Oppose	Undecided
Ipsos	Reuters	Sep. 8–14, 2023	4,413 adults	± 2	41%	35%	24%
YouGov	—N/a	Sep. 13, 2023	3,943 adults		44%	41%	15%

=== Support for impeachment ===
Support for impeachment
Poll source	Poll sponsor	Date(s) administered	Sample size	Margin of error	Support	Oppose	Undecided
Monmouth University	—N/a	Sep. 19–24, 2023	814 adults	±4.5	34%	59%	

== Outcome ==
The three investigating committees released a nearly 300-page report on August 19, 2024, alleging "impeachable conduct" but did not recommend specific articles of impeachment, focusing primarily on the activities of Hunter Biden and his associates, and the president's brother, Jim Biden. The report was released on the first day of the 2024 Democratic National Convention and on the morning of the day President Biden spoke at the convention. It was not then clear what any further steps Republican investigators might take.
