= United States House Oversight Committee investigation into the Biden family =

Congressional investigation, launched 2023

The United States House Oversight Committee investigation into the Biden family is an ongoing investigation since January 2023 by the United States House of Representatives into U.S. President Joe Biden and his family. The investigation was initiated on January 11, and includes examination of the foreign business activities of Biden's son, Hunter, and brother, James, as well as Twitter's involvement in the Hunter Biden laptop controversy.

By November 2023, the investigation had not found any evidence of wrongdoing by President Biden. Nevertheless, in September 2023, then-House Speaker Kevin McCarthy directed committee chairman James Comer to lead a formal three-committee impeachment inquiry.

The three investigating committees released a nearly 300-page report on August 19, 2024, alleging "impeachable conduct" but did not recommend specific articles of impeachment, focusing primarily on the activities of Hunter Biden and his associates, and the president's brother, James Biden.

== Background ==
In 2006, Joe Biden's brother James joined his son Hunter in purchasing a New York City-based hedge fund, Paradigm. In 2014, Hunter accepted a business consulting engagement with the Ukrainian energy company Burisma and was appointed to the company's board of directors. The U.S. State Department expressed concerns about Hunter's involvement with Burisma due to its history of corruption, and potential conflicts with Obama administration policy. In 2017, Hunter also co-founded international investment fund BHR Partners, based in China.

When Joe Biden announced his candidacy for president in 2019, the Trump presidential re-election campaign sought evidence of possible financial impropriety and influence peddling. Trump personal attorney Rudy Giuliani and a team of associates traveled to Ukraine during 2019. In 2020, the FBI and Scott Brady, a US attorney appointed by Trump and assigned by attorney general Bill Barr, had examined these allegations but could not substantiate them.

Joe Biden claimed that he had no knowledge of, or investments in, his son's foreign business ventures. A 2020 investigation led by Republican senators Ron Johnson and Chuck Grassley found no evidence of wrongdoing by Joe Biden, noting only that Hunter Biden had used his family name to develop business relationships.

In October 2020, the New York Post reported about a laptop belonging to Hunter Biden. The laptop had emails to Hunter Biden that mentioned Joe Biden. While neither email indicated that Joe Biden was involved in any of the business matters, the laptop garnered significant attention from Republicans and conservative media as the Hunter Biden laptop controversy. Despite extensive scrutiny of Hunter Biden's laptop contents by multiple parties, no evidence of wrongdoing by Joe Biden was found.

In 2019, in what became known as the Trump–Ukraine scandal, Trump unsuccessfully attempted to pressure Ukrainian president Volodymyr Zelenskyy into falsely announcing his government was investigating the Bidens; the pressure campaign resulted in Trump's first impeachment.

During the 2022 midterm elections campaign, Republicans promised to investigate the laptop and related matters, leading to the Oversight Committee investigation in January 2023 once they gained control of the House of Representatives.

== Proceedings ==
Committee chairman Comer launched the investigation on January 11, 2023, with a letter to Treasury Secretary Janet Yellen regarding alleged Biden family "foreign business practices and international influence peddling schemes". Comer also wrote several former Twitter executives to request their testimony before the committee in February.

=== First hearing ===
As Vice President during the Obama administration, Joe Biden had spearheaded the effort to encourage adopting economic and democratic reforms for the government of Ukraine. In 2016, Biden pressured the Ukrainian government to fire prosecutor general Viktor Shokin, due to concerns of ineffectiveness and corruption. Despite Biden acting in accordance with American, EU, and IMF policy, Trump allies had alleged Shokin was fired to protect Burisma and Hunter Biden from corruption investigations. (Note: In March 2016, testimony to the Senate Foreign Relations Committee, former ambassador to Ukraine John E. Herbst stated, "By late fall of 2015, the EU and the United States joined the chorus of those seeking Mr. Shokin's removal" and that Joe Biden "spoke publicly about this before and during his December visit to Kyiv". During the same hearing, assistant secretary of state Victoria Nuland stated, "we have pegged our next $1 billion loan guarantee, first and foremost, to having a rebooting of the reform coalition so that we know who we are working with, but secondarily, to ensuring that the prosecutor general's office gets cleaned up".)

During the committee's first public hearing on February 8, Comer falsely asserted in an opening statement that Biden did so to end an investigation of Burisma. This allegation was first published in an October 2020 New York Post story but had been repeatedly debunked. Prior to the hearing, many Republicans had alleged Twitter and the FBI had colluded to suppress the October 2020 New York Post story on Hunter Biden's laptop. Four former Twitter employees testified at the first committee hearing, contradicting the claims.

In September 2019, Trump had tweeted that Chrissy Teigen was "filthy mouthed"; and Teigen tweeted vulgarities in response. During the hearing, it was disclosed that the Trump White House later asked Twitter to remove the tweet, but got declined. Committee Democrats suggested hypocrisy among Republicans for complaining of government influence on Twitter and suppression of free speech.

Fox News served as an important platform for Comer and his allies to broadcast unfounded allegations against the Bidens. In August 2023, host Brian Kilmeade interviewed Viktor Shokin on One Nation with Brian Kilmeade where the latter repeated these allegations. A month later, former Ukrainian president Petro Poroshenko appeared on the show stating Shokin was fired by the Ukrainian parliament "for his own statement" and "he played a very dirty game unfortunately."

=== Later developments ===
In March 2023, Jamie Raskin, Democratic ranking member of the Oversight Committee, disclosed that the chairman had quietly issued sweeping subpoenas of fourteen years of banking records of Hunter Biden associates involved with CEFC China Energy. Raskin also alleged cooperation between committee Republicans and a Trump attorney to quietly drop an Oversight Committee investigation into whether Trump improperly profited from his presidency.

=== Joe Biden bribery allegation ===
On May 3, 2023, Comer and Republican senator Chuck Grassley wrote to attorney general Merrick Garland and FBI director Christopher Wray a whistleblower allegedly revealed policy decisions being made in exchange for money from a foreign national. This whistleblower was a former FBI informant, Alexander Smirnov, who claimed the FBI had buried the tip.

A year later, in February 2024, Smirnov was indicted by the US Justice Department on allegations he had fabricated his account based on Russian intelligence officials' instructions. Prosecutors said Smirnov had been "actively peddling new lies that could impact US elections" since meeting with Russian agents in late 2023. On December 12, 2024, it was reported that Smirnov agreed to plead guilty to lying to the FBI and to admit that he fabricated the Burisma bribery story about Joe and Hunter Biden.

Comer subpoenaed the FBI for a document from June 2020, despite the form being used by FBI officials to note tips from informants, regardless of them being verified. Committee ranking member Raskin characterized the subpoena as a "baseless partisan stunt". On May 10, the FBI declined to provide the form, citing confidentiality and the lack of credibility it would provide.

One purported informant the committee sought to interview was Gal Luft, who claimed to inform FBI and Justice Department agents in March 2019 of alleged Biden corruption. A dual US-Israeli citizen, Luft was arrested in Cyprus in February 2023 at the request of American authorities seeking extradition; he was released on bail and became a fugitive. In July, the US Justice Department unsealed an indictment of Luft on eight counts related to arms trafficking, and in 2016, paying a high-ranking government official and advisor to Donald Trump, as an unregistered agent for Chinese interests. Comer had characterized Luft as a "very credible witness" three days before the indictment.

The New York Times reported that some of the materials Brady reviewed were "junk and plainly not credible", but that Brady forwarded some materials to other prosecutors. Raskin also said that the tip from the highly credible informant was a recounting of conversations with a Ukrainian energy magnate, but the informant could not vouch for the veracity of what that person had said, and that after an initial assessment the Brady investigators closed the matter in August 2020. By June 2023, multiple Republican lawmakers acknowledged that the existence of the recordings have yet to be verified.

Analysis by The Washington Post in late May noted that the letter and documents Comer and Grassley had publicly released made "an allegation of an allegation of bribery". Mediaite and Media Matters reported that after committee Republicans had viewed the form on June 8, some Fox News hosts started claiming it showed Joe Biden had received payments, despite earlier reporting that the document did not say that.

Senator Ron Johnson later said the source was believed to be Mykola Zlochevsky, a co-founder of Burisma Holdings. Giuliani sought Zlochevsky's assistance in 2019 to seek dirt on the Bidens, though Zlochevsky told a journalist at the time that he had never spoken with Joe Biden. Zlochevsky was implicated in paying $5 million in bribes to Ukrainian officials in June 2020. Asked about Zlochevsky on June 15, Comer replied, "Unfortunately, nobody's had any contact with him for the last three years".

Grassley publicly released the form on July 20, 2023. According to the document, Zlochevsky told the FBI informant in 2016 that he had paid the Bidens $5 million each, which the informant could not confirm. The account was contradicted by an earlier conversation with Zlochevsky, provided to Congress in January 2020. The FBI criticized the release of the document, asserting it "unnecessarily risks the safety of a confidential source".

=== May 2023 report ===
On May 10, 2023, Comer released a 36-page report of interim findings and held a press conference with other Republican members of the committee. The report did not find any evidence of wrongdoing or money directed to Biden. Asked by reporters if he could name a specific official policy decision Joe Biden had made that may have been directly influenced by foreign payments, Comer said he could not.

=== Allegation of Justice Department cover-up ===
On June 20, 2023, Hunter Biden agreed to plead guilty to federal tax offenses. The terms of the plea were described as a "sweetheart deal" and many alleged that it was part of a "two-tiered justice system".

Two days later, the House Ways and Means Committee released depositions from two IRS investigators who worked on the Biden case and who alleged Justice Department interference in the investigation, as well as being denied special counsel status. This was refuted by the U.S. Attorney leading the investigation, David Weiss, in a letter to Senator Lindsey Graham on July 10. On the day the depositions were released, Comer released a statement asserting "Now we know that Biden's Justice Department has been actively engaged in a cover-up to protect the Bidens from facing justice".

The Weiss letter to Graham supported Garland's earlier congressional testimony that the prosecutor had been given full authority over his investigation. As House Republicans sought closed-door interviews with Weiss and others, on July 24, the Justice Department proposed Weiss provide public testimony to dispute what it saw as misrepresentations about his investigation. Weiss told a closed-door session of the House Judiciary Committee on November 7 that he was the decision-maker in the investigation, he was not hindered in any way and there were no political considerations involved.

Raskin sent Comer an 11-page letter on July 28 alleging Republicans were "concealing key evidence" that disproved their allegations against the Bidens. Specifically, Raskin alleged that the committee had released "key takeaways" from a recent deposition of a former FBI supervisory agent, asserting it supported the testimony of the two IRS whistleblowers, rather than releasing the full transcript. Raskin wrote that the transcript discredited the testimony by showing the investigation of Hunter Biden followed procedure and was free of political considerations. Raskin also chastised Comer for alleging Joe Biden had laundered money through his granddaughter's bank account.

=== Devon Archer testimony ===
Former Hunter Biden business partner and fellow Burisma board member Devon Archer provided more than five hours of closed-door testimony to committee members on July 31. Republicans had long considered Archer a key witness in their search to directly connect the president to his son's business activities. Both Republicans and Democrats who attended the interview later said Archer testified that over the course of ten years Hunter Biden put his father on speakerphone about twenty times while in the presence of business associates but that Joe Biden "never once spoke about any business dealings". Democratic congressman Dan Goldman told reporters that Archer characterized the calls as "all casual conversation, niceties, the weather, 'What's going on?'" Goldman said Archer testified Hunter Biden sold the "illusion of access" to his father in business meetings.

Hunter Biden's former business partner insisted in testimony to Congress Monday that President Joe Biden was never directly involved in their financial dealings, though Hunter would often put his famous father on speakerphone to impress clients and business associates.

Goldman said Archer was asked about bribery allegations against the Bidens and responded he was unaware of any bribes and would be shocked if there were any.

Archer contradicted a claim made by Trump and the Comer committee that in 2014 Russian billionaire Yelena Baturina wired $3.5 million to a shell company account controlled by him and Hunter Biden. Trump alleged the payment went to Joe Biden. Archer testified the wire was a commission payment for a Brooklyn real estate transaction he had brokered for Baturina that accidentally went into a wrong account for a company Hunter Biden had an ownership stake in, and that Biden had no role in the real estate deal.

Some Republicans misrepresented the Archer testimony, in some cases asserting the opposite of what he had said. Comer said on Hannity "Every day this bribery scandal becomes more credible", though the testimony indicated there was no evidence of bribery. Congresswomen Marjorie Taylor Greene and Lauren Boebert falsely asserted Archer testified Joe Biden had participated in his son's business deals over twenty times, though Archer testified Joe Biden never discussed business. On Hannity, Comer and Jim Jordan alleged that in December 2015 Hunter Biden phoned his father asking him to help Burisma and that the vice president traveled to Ukraine five days later to call for Shokin's removal, though the trip had been publicly announced weeks earlier. Archer testified Hunter had called someone in Washington but was not sure it was Joe Biden. Republican congressman Andy Biggs said the Archer testimony implicated the president directly and that an impeachment inquiry was necessary. Comer released a statement asserting the testimony "confirms Joe Biden lied to the American people when he said he had no knowledge about his son's business dealings and was not involved". Greene concurred and said a formal impeachment inquiry was the logical next step.

=== Further Hunter Biden financial allegations ===
On 25 September, the committee issued a subpoena for Hunter Biden's bank records. They found two wire transfers in summer 2019 from Chinese nationals that listed his father's Delaware home as the beneficiary address. Hunter's attorney stated that these were loans from a Chinese company that Hunter had invested in; and that the address listed was for his new bank account, which used his parents' address as his only permanent address at the time.

On 20 October, Comer released a bank check from March 2018 noted as "loan repayment" from James Biden's account to Joe Biden, for $200,000. A few days later, fact checkers also found a check for $40,000 in September 2017, also marked "loan repayment," which Comer released soon thereafter. During a 12 December Newsmax appearance, Comer asserted that the payment involved a Hunter Biden company and was giving Joe Biden a 10% cut of the deal. Joe Biden was not mentioned in the final deal proposal and the deal never closed.

Comer also presented an email from a bank money laundering investigator who wrote the Owasco account activity "appears unusual with no current business purpose." Comer asserted on Fox News on December 3 that the investigator had found evidence of money laundering and tax evasion. Committee Democrats soon released three other pages from the same email chain indicating an Owasco official had explained to bank investigators how the company seeks large, complex deals with substantial up-front expenses and fees before deals close and begin generating revenue. Another email showed a more senior bank investigator had found the activity "reasonable and consistent with the business profile" of the company and "clearly written in operating agreements," recommending the matter be waived.

Since February 2023, Comer had sent letters requesting documents, records, and communications to Hunter Biden and his associates. Abbe Lowell, Hunter Biden's attorney, rebuffed the request, responding in a letter that the committee did not have any legitimate legislative purpose and that Comer had "shamelessly maligned" his client. On November 28, Hunter Biden's attorney told the committee his client was prepared to testify, but only in public rather than in a closed-door setting. Comer rejected the proposal, saying Hunter Biden should have an opportunity for public testimony after his private interview.

The committee interviewed Kevin Morris, a friend of Hunter Biden. Morris had lent millions of dollars to Hunter in 2019 to pay back taxes and cover personal expenses. The interview transcript was not immediately released, but Republicans alleged these loans "may ultimately be forgiven". This was refuted by Morris, who repeatedly testified he fully expected the loans to be repaid.

=== Impeachment inquiry developments ===
McCarthy announced on September 12 that he was directing the Oversight, Judiciary and Ways and Means committees to begin such an inquiry, to be led by Comer. McCarthy did not mention whether a full House vote might be held. Some Republican donors conveyed to party leaders their concerns that impeachment was a risky political strategy; Republican committee member Nancy Mace warned impeachment could cost Republicans their House majority in 2024. Raskin asserted an inquiry was intended to distract from Trump's "mounting criminal indictments and deepening legal morass".

The committee held its only public hearing under an impeachment inquiry on September 28. Comer said in his opening statement that investigators had "uncovered a mountain of evidence", but committee members did not present clear evidence to support the allegation. Three expert witnesses called by committee Republicans testified there was not impeachable evidence against Biden at that point. Committee Republicans made several false or misleading statements during the hearing. Nancy Mace falsely stated, "We already know the president took bribes from Burisma."

The Washington Post reported that during a November 7 luncheon with the Republican Governance Group, House Speaker Mike Johnson indicated there was insufficient evidence to initiate formal impeachment proceedings.

Despite lacking evidence of wrongdoing by the president, on December 13 majority House Republicans unanimously approved a resolution to initiate formal impeachment proceedings. Democrats unanimously voted against the resolution.

=== Lev Parnas testimony ===
At the invitation of committee Democrats, on March 20, 2024, Lev Parnas testified before the Committee as it was investigating the possibility of impeachment of President Joe Biden. Parnas claimed that allegations of Biden family corruption were falsehoods and Russian disinformation.

== Presentation of interim findings ==
In August 2023, Glenn Kessler, the lead fact-checker for The Washington Post, analyzed the committee's presentation of its interim findings in staff memos and Comer's comments in conservative media and on Twitter. Kessler found the memos, while written in a partisan tone that ignored or downplayed contrary information, tended to use more restrained language than did Comer in public statements. Another memo described "$20 million in payments from foreign sources to the Biden family and their business associates," while on Newsmax Comer said "The Biden family received over $20 million from our enemies around the world." Kessler found that payments from foreign sources totaled $23 million, though all but $7.5 million went to Hunter Biden business associates, and nothing was traced to Joe Biden.

== Impact ==
Analysis by The Washington Post in late May 2023 noted that the letter and documents Comer and Grassley had publicly released made an allegation of bribery. During the few weeks after the release, Fox News mentioned a "bribe" or "bribery" in the context of Biden more than 100 times, though no new information had surfaced during that time.

In a May 22, 2023, Fox News interview, Comer said he believed the media attention his investigation had drawn "absolutely" affected Joe Biden's lower polling relative to Trump's.

Despite the investigation finding no evidence of wrongdoing, it resulted in a formal three-committee impeachment inquiry led by Comer. A profile from the New York Times noted that this investigation "propelled [Comer] to stardom" and noted that he had "become an aggressive promoter of sinister-sounding claims about the president and his family."

The key witness, Alexander Smirnov, pleaded guilty to lying to Congress. On December 12, 2024, it was reported that Smirnov agreed to plead guilty to lying to the FBI and to admit that he fabricated the Burisma bribery story about Joe and Hunter Biden.
