= Weiss special counsel investigation =

Criminal investigation into Hunter Biden

Final report by Weiss, dated January 10, 2025

The Weiss special counsel investigation was a criminal investigation into Hunter Biden, the son of U.S. President Joe Biden. Attorney General Merrick Garland announced the appointment of David Weiss, U.S. Attorney for the District of Delaware, as the special counsel on August 11, 2023, three days after Weiss requested such authority.

Since 2018, Weiss had been investigating Hunter Biden as U.S. attorney. In 2023, Republicans asked Garland to appoint a special counsel, some specifically demanding Weiss, a Republican appointed to his role by President Donald Trump. Garland ultimately appointed Weiss, giving him additional authority. However, congressional Republicans then expressed criticism, some stating Weiss was untrustworthy.

A plea agreement negotiated in July 2023 fell through after a U.S. district judge declined to approve it, due to disagreement between the defense and prosecution about the extent of the prosecutorial immunity offered. In September 2023, Hunter Biden was indicted on gun-related charges arising from his purchase of a handgun in 2018, when he had an addiction to cocaine. In December 2023, the special counsel indicted Biden on nine additional counts, all tax-related charges. Biden's gun trial began on June 3, 2024, and he was found guilty of all counts on June 11, making him the first child of a sitting U.S. president to be convicted in a criminal trial. Hunter Biden was scheduled to face an additional trial related to the tax charges starting on September 5, 2024. On this day, however, he would instead change his plea to guilty.

On December 1, 2024, President Biden granted Hunter Biden a full and unconditional pardon for all offenses charged by Special Counsel Weiss and for any other crimes he may be alleged to have committed from January 1, 2014, through December 1, 2024. He said he made this decision due to what he claimed was the "selective" and "political" nature of the charges against his son, which he deemed an extraordinary affront to justice, necessitating his rare interference in the justice system. David Weiss later issued a statement saying "There was none and never has been any evidence of vindictive or selective prosecution in this case.”

On January 13, 2025, Weiss's special counsel report was released. In the report, Weiss criticized the assertions made by President Biden in his December 1 pardon, noting "Calling those rulings into question and injecting partisanship into the independent administration of the law undermines the very foundation of what makes America's justice system fair and equitable. It erodes public confidence in an institution that is essential to preserving the rule of law...[T]hese baseless accusations have no merit and repeating them threatens the integrity of the justice system as a whole." Weiss also stated that because of the pardon, he was prevented from making "additional charging decision". Hunter Biden's legal team did not review the report prior to its public release.

== Investigation ==
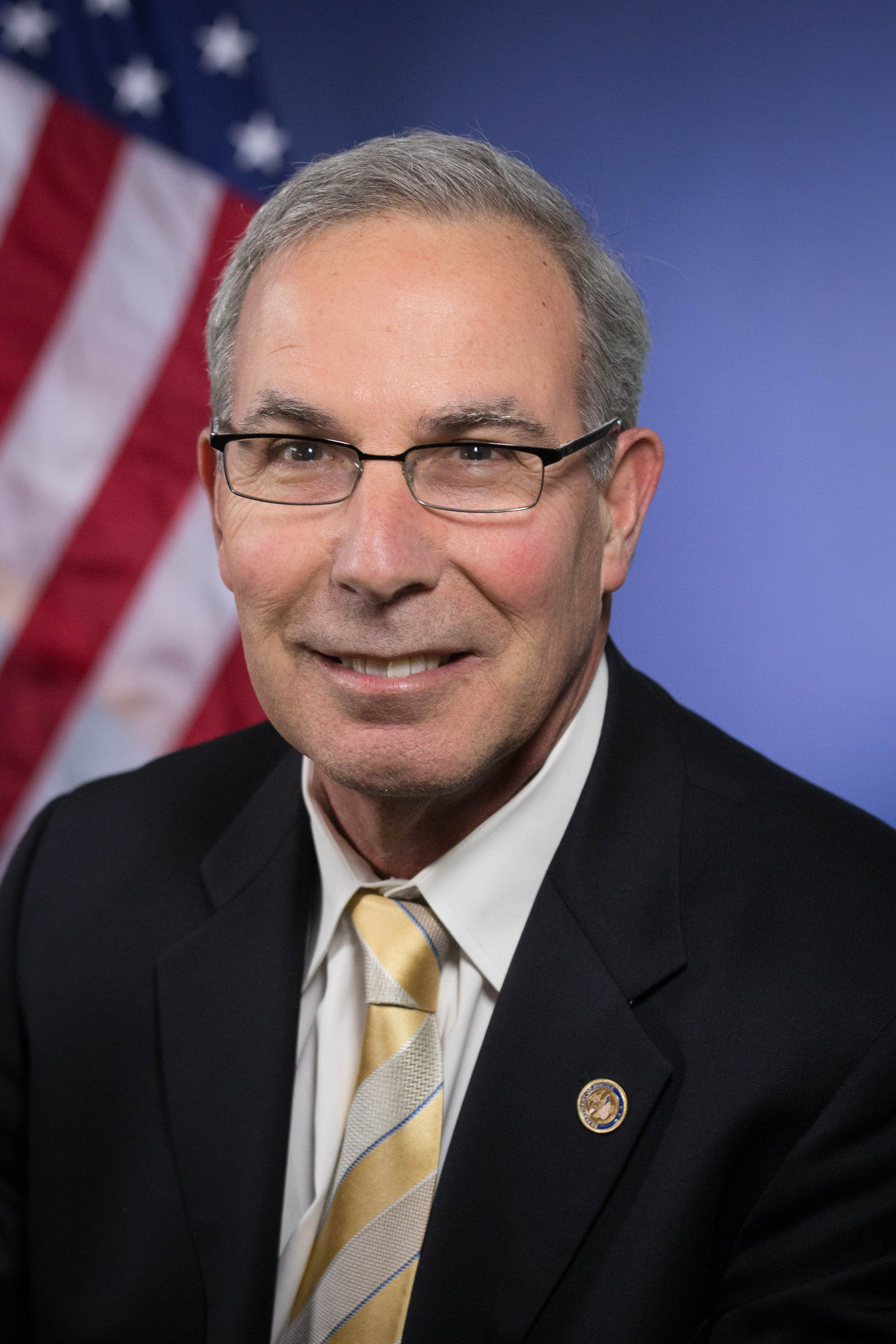
U.S. attorney David Weiss

=== Trump administration ===
In December 2020, Hunter Biden disclosed his tax affairs were under Justice Department (DOJ) criminal investigation. Begun in late 2018, the investigation initially examined possible money laundering, but the Federal Bureau of Investigation (FBI) investigators were unable to find sufficient evidence to justify a prosecution.

On December 8, 2020, prosecutors in Delaware served two subpoenas, at least one regarding Biden's taxes. Trump administration attorney general William Barr said in December 2020 that he did not see the need for a special counsel, distancing himself from statements of then-president Donald Trump, who had pressed him to use the DOJ to attack the Biden family during his 2020 presidential campaign.

The investigation was led by David Weiss, a Republican, and Trump-appointed U.S. Attorney for the State of Delaware.

=== Biden administration ===
Weiss was asked to remain in his position in the Biden administration to continue the investigation. Garland, the Biden administration's attorney general, said that Weiss had full independence amid claims by House Republicans of DOJ interference. According to Gary Shapley and Joseph Ziegler—two Internal Revenue Service (IRS) whistleblowers who testified to Congress—Weiss sought special counsel status, but his request was denied. Both Weiss and Garland denied these claims. Garland said that Weiss had "full authority" to bring cases. In a July 10, 2023 letter to senator Lindsey Graham, Weiss wrote he had discussed with DOJ officials being given "special attorney" status that would allow him to file charges in any federal judicial district; that he was assured he would be granted such authority if it became necessary; and that he had "never been denied the authority to bring charges in any jurisdiction". Garland said had Weiss requested special counsel status, his request would have been approved. He added that Weiss would have more power as a U.S. attorney than as special counsel. According to a transcript obtained by news organizations, FBI agent Thomas Sobocinski, who since 2021 oversaw the investigation into Hunter Biden (as special agent in charge of the FBI's Baltimore field office), disputed Shapley and Ziegler's claims of political interference. In testimony to the House Judiciary Committee, Sobocinski contradicted Shapley's claim that Weiss had said in an October 2022 meeting that he was "not the deciding person on whether charges are filed"; Sobocinski, who attended the meeting, said Weiss never said such a thing, and "If he would have said that, I would have remembered it." CBS News later obtained what Shapley said were his contemporaneous notes of the meeting in which Shapley wrote, "Weiss stated – He is not the deciding person".

In October 2022, federal agents concluded that there was sufficient evidence to charge Biden with violations of law relating to his tax filings and the October 2018 gun purchase. Specifically, by April 2023, prosecutors were considering bringing four charges: two misdemeanor counts for failure to file taxes, a single felony count of tax evasion, and a charge related to a gun purchase.

==== Plea agreement negotiations, collapse, and subsequent plea ====
On June 20, 2023, Hunter Biden and prosecutors entered a plea agreement, agreeing to probation for filing his taxes late and entering into a diversion program on the gun charge in return for broad immunity from prosecution in perpetuity for a range of matters being investigated by the Justice Department. According to The New York Times, judge Maryellen Noreika seemed skeptical about the deal and questioned why it had been filed under a provision that gave her no legal authority to reject it. When questioned, prosecutor Leo Wise acknowledged that there was no precedent for the kind of deal proposed.

Hunter Biden's attorney said the agreement with prosecutors "resolved" the investigation, though Weiss prosecutors said the investigation was "ongoing". Prosecutors later explained that the "ongoing" aspect of the investigation referred to possible charges of failing to register as a foreign agent under the Foreign Agents Registration Act (FARA). Republicans asserted Biden received a "sweetheart deal" as the son of the president. Legal experts said charges are rarely brought under circumstances such as Biden's.

On July 26, Judge Maryellen Noreika declined to accept the deal, pending clarification of its terms by the parties. House Republicans and conservative groups had sought to block the deal the previous day. Biden attorneys asserted that the collapsed plea deal still gives him an immunity from prosecution on the felony gun charge. Prosecutors said that the agreement was never made valid.

== Special counsel and firearm indictment ==
The order appointing David C. Weiss as special counsel, dated August 11, 2023

On August 11, 2023, Garland appointed Weiss as special counsel. The same day, Weiss filed a document stating negotiations had broken down.

On September 14, 2023, Hunter Biden was indicted on three gun charges returned by a federal grand jury in Wilmington, Delaware. Two counts allege that Biden lied on his Form 4473 when he purchased a .38 caliber Colt Cobra handgun in Delaware in 2018, by certifying on the form that he was not an unlawful user of, or addicted to, a controlled substance; the other count alleges possession of a firearm as a prohibited person (under federal law, addicts of controlled substances may not own firearms, which was found to be unconstitutional by SCOTUS in Robinson v. California). The three counts are felonies with a maximum sentence of 25 years in prison. Biden purchased the gun during a period when he was struggling with cocaine addiction; he possessed the gun for about 11 days, from October 12 to October 23, 2018, until Hallie Biden tossed the gun in a dumpster. Hunter Biden never used the gun to commit a crime. He has said that he has been sober since 2019. The indictment charges Biden with violating the following laws:

1. 18 U.S.C. §922(a)(6): It shall be unlawful...for any person in connection with the acquisition or attempted acquisition of any firearm or ammunition from a licensed importer, licensed manufacturer, licensed dealer, or licensed collector, knowingly to make any false or fictitious oral or written statement or to furnish or exhibit any false, fictitious, or misrepresented identification, intended or likely to deceive such importer, manufacturer, dealer, or collector with respect to any fact material to the lawfulness of the sale or other disposition of such firearm or ammunition under the provisions of this chapter;
2. 18 U.S.C. §922(g)(3): It shall be unlawful for any person...who is an unlawful user of or addicted to any controlled substance (as defined in section 102 of the Controlled Substances Act (21 U.S.C. 802))...to ship or transport in interstate or foreign commerce, or possess in or affecting commerce, any firearm or ammunition; or to receive any firearm or ammunition which has been shipped or transported in interstate or foreign commerce.
3. 18 U.S.C. §924(a)(1)(A): ...whoever knowingly makes any false statement or representation with respect to the information required by this chapter to be kept in the records of a person licensed under this chapter or in applying for any license or exemption or relief from disability under the provisions of this chapter...shall be fined under this title, imprisoned not more than five years, or both.

ATF Form 4473, October 2016 revision

Question 11.e. on the form asked, "Are you an unlawful user of, or addicted to, marijuana or any depressant, stimulant, narcotic drug, or any other controlled substance?"

At his initial appearance and arraignment in Wilmington on October 3, 2023, Biden pleaded not guilty on all gun charges. His lawyers have said the statute he was charged under is unconstitutional.

In November 2023, Hunter Biden's attorneys filed a motion for authorization to issue subpoenas for documents from Donald Trump, former Attorney General Bill Barr and other Department of Justice officials. Biden's attorneys contend that the documents that could be obtained by the subpoenas could support their theory that the charges are the result of a "selective or vindictive prosecution arising from an unrelenting pressure campaign beginning in the last administration." Weiss opposed this request, denying that the prosecution is vindictive or selective, and arguing that these claims can only be raised during trial.

In January 2024, prosecutors argued to maintain the gun charge, revealing that cocaine residue was found in Biden's gun pouch; at the time of this report, it was again noted that possessing a gun while using illegal drugs is against the law.

=== Trial and conviction ===
United States v. Biden
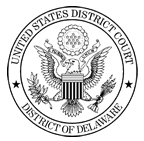
- Court: United States District Court for the District of Delaware
- Full case name: United States of America v. Robert Hunter Biden
- Submitted: September 14, 2023
- Started: June 3, 2024
- Decided: June 11, 2024
- Verdict: Guilty on all counts (Note: Biden was found guilty in violation of 18 USC, Sections 922(a)(6) and 924(a)(2), 18 USC, Section 924(a)(1)(A), and 18 USC, Sections 922(g)(3) and 924(a)(2).)
- Charge: Possession of a gun while addicted to a controlled substance (1 felony count); Making false statements (2 felony counts)

Court membership
- Judge sitting: Maryellen Noreika

A final pre-trial hearing for Biden's firearm charges was held on May 24, 2024. At the same time, it was stated that Biden's trial for these charges was set to begin June 3, 2024. During the final hearing, Judge Maryellen Noreika ruled that prosecutors could not refer to his upcoming California tax trial, child support proceedings in Arkansas, his discharge from the Navy, or include a statement which Biden made at a July 2023 hearing where his plea deal collapsed. However, the prosecution will be able to bring up Biden's drug use, portions of his memoir Beautiful Things, and a summary of data from his phone and iPad.

The trial began in the District Court for the District of Delaware courthouse on June 3, 2024. A jury of six men and six women was selected that day. On June 4, opening statements were heard. After opening statements concluded, FBI special agent Erika Jensen took the stand to testify as the prosecution's first witness. During her testimony, Jensen noted passages from Biden's memoir where Biden acknowledged his addiction and crack smoking, with the jury also hearing passages from the memoir's audiobook. Jensen also verified bank statements which were made from Biden's Wells Fargo account, indicating he made ATM withdraws in California and Washington D.C. in April 2019. Between September and November 2018, Biden also made $151,640.45 in cash withdrawals. Biden was also confirmed to have been in at a detox center in Southern California known as "The View" 40 days before he purchased the Colt Cobra revolver, even though he claimed on the ATF form which was used during the gun purchase that he was not using illegal drugs at the time of the purchase. Hunter's laptop and iPad were also introduced as evidence, revealing, among other things, messages Hunter exchanged and a photo of what appeared to be cocaine.

On June 5, Biden's ex-wife Kathleen Buhle, ex-girlfriend Zoe Kestan, and Gordon Cleveland, the gun retailer who sold Biden the Colt Cobra which was the subject of the trial, all testified. Buhle testified that she did not become aware of Biden being a drug user until 2015. Buhle testified she never saw Biden use drugs but learned about his drug use while in therapy and further stated that she would search his car before their daughters used it as he would leave drugs and drug paraphernalia in it. Kestan, who at one point lived with Biden, testified that she saw Biden use crack when they first met in 2017 when she was a part-time stripper and that he was a drug addict throughout much of their relationship. She said that she saw Biden smoking crack cocaine "every 20 minutes or so" in a Malibu home that he had rented in 2018. Kestan left Malibu around September 22 and 23 to head back to the East Coast. Cleveland testified that Biden asked for a Colt revolver, even though he showed Biden some Rugers guns, and that he also saw Biden fill out the ATF form in question. The gun was also introduced as evidence. Cleveland stated that Biden purchased a box of hollow bullets, which Cleveland told Biden were better for self-defense.

On June 6, Biden's former lover and sister-in-law Hallie Biden testified. In her testimony, Hallie stated how she became a drug user after Hunter introduced her to drugs, but quit using them a couple of months before he bought the gun. She noted how she found crack and the gun in Hunter's truck and also tossed the gun in their trash can after putting it in a leather bag. It was also noted that Hunter did tell Delaware State Police that he bought the gun for target practice. Hallie also noted how she tried to track Hunter down in the days after he purchased the gun, and that he replied by claiming that he was waiting to meet a dealer and smoking crack on a car. A text from October 13, 2018, showed how Biden purchased drugs from a dealer who he described as "Mookie."

Also on June 6, former Delaware State Police Lt. Millard Greer testified how he located the gun from the man who removed the from the trash can. It was acknowledged how Hallie discovered that the gun was missing. Delaware State Police officer Joshua Marley, who reported the gun, testified as well. Edward Banner, the man who found the gun in the trash can while it was still in the leather pouch, would also testify. On June 7, 2024, FBI forensic chemist James Brewer testified that cocaine residue was found the in leather pouch where the gun was kept; the defense previously argued in opening statements that it was unknown if the residue belonged to either Hunter or Hallie. The same day, Drug Enforcement Administration (DEA) agent Joshua Romig testified that Hunter Biden was using coded messages which were known for drugs and also how a photo on Hunter's electronic devices from April 2018 showed cocaine. In addition, Romig stated that several pictures from Hunter's devices showed what appeared to be a crack pipe with burnt marks.

On June 7, the defense called its first witness, Jason Turner, who ran a background check and made sales for the store where the gun was purchased. Turner testified how he approved the background check which was required to sell Biden the gun, noting that Biden verified his address. Turner also noted how Biden used his passport and vehicle registration as identification. Though he could show the form related to the passport, Biden's lawyer Abbe Lowell was denied the option of also showing the second form related to the vehicle registration, as it was previously acknowledged to have been doctored during a pretrial hearing. Naomi Biden, Hunter Biden's daughter, also testified in her father's defense. Naomi testified how she visited her father when he was in rehabilitation in California during the summer of 2018. Naomi also stated that "I knew he was struggling with addiction," though she never saw him use drugs, and stated that "things got bad after Hunter's brother Beau died in 2015." However, the prosecution was able to point out that Biden indicated in an October 2018 text message that he was avoiding his daughter when he went to New York to visit her. At one point during his time in New York, Biden met in his hotel room with someone named "Frankie" and also gave this person the access key to his Wells Fargo account.

On June 10, the prosecution and defense met with Judge Noreika before the jury's arrival to discuss finalizing jury instructions. During this time, Lowell indicated that Biden wouldn't testify. Following the conclusion of lawyer deliberations, the defense would rest their case without calling any further witnesses. In their rebuttal case, the prosecution would have Erika Jensen give further testimony. Following Jensen's testimony and defense cross-examination, Judge Noreika would begin reading the instructions to the jury. Noreika stated that she would read up to the part related to closing arguments. During closing arguments, the prosecution stated that evidence against Biden was "overwhelming" and ugly," noting how even his ex-girlfriend Zoe Kestan testified that she saw him use crack a little over two weeks before he purchased the gun. In the defense's closing argument, the prosecution's evidence was claimed to be "speculation or conjecture," with the defense placing more blame on the gun store.

Following a rebuttal from the prosecution, jury instructions were completed. The jury then beginning deliberations. The jury concluded the first day of deliberations without a verdict being announced. On the second day, the jury reached a verdict, finding Biden guilty of all charges.

== Tax indictment ==
On December 7, 2023, the special counsel indicted Biden on nine tax-related charges, including three felony and six misdemeanor offenses, alleging that Biden failed to pay $1.4 million in taxes between 2016 and 2019. Biden faced up to 17 years in prison if convicted. On January 11, 2024, Biden pleaded not guilty to all tax evasion charges in a Los Angeles federal courthouse.

Originally scheduled to start on June 20, 2024, the trial for these charges was postponed in May 2024 so it would begin on September 5, 2024. The postponement came after an attorney for Hunter Biden claimed that the firearm charges trial made it so his defense didn't have time to prepare for the initial June 20 start date. A pre-trial hearing which involved Biden's lawyers was held on August 21, 2024.

=== Guilty plea ===
On September 5, 2024, Biden's defense lawyer Abbe Lowell revealed that Biden would instead plead to guilty to the charges he faced, a reversal from his initial not guilty plea. It was not immediately made clear that Judge Mark C. Scarsi would accept this plea proposal, regarded as an Alford plea. Under this plea agreement, Biden would've accepted a sentence and that there was enough evidence to convict him, but also maintain his innocence.

Later in the day, it was reported that this plea offer would not be accepted by the prosecution. Judge Scarsi would not accept the plea or call off the trial, but did not make a final ruling and instead opted to make a decision about the plea offer at a later time. However, Scarsi would accept a guilty plea by the end of the day, with Biden pleading guilty to all nine charges. During his plea hearing, Biden responded "Yes" after Scarsi asked him "Do you agree you committed every element of the charges in the indictment?"

== January 2024 Contempt of Congress recommendation and deposition agreement ==
On January 10, 2024, Biden and attorney Abbe Lowell made a surprise appearance at a House Oversight Committee meeting which had been convened to discuss possibly holding Biden in Contempt of Congress. Nancy Mace declared Biden "too afraid to show up for a deposition" with him present. Jared Moskowitz invited the committee to "take a vote", asking, "Who wants to hear from Hunter right now, today?" The same day, the House Judiciary Committee and House Oversight Committee each voted to recommend a full House vote to hold Biden in contempt of Congress. The House Judiciary Committee approved the recommendation to hold Biden in contempt by 23 to 14, followed by the House Oversight Committee with a vote of 25–21. The Republican chairs released a report in which they said that Biden was in contempt. On January 12, the House of Representatives agreed to hold a full vote on holding Biden in contempt the following week. The holding of contempt would have referred the matter to the Justice Department, which would have then decided whether to charge Biden with contempt. On January 16, Republicans called off the full vote to allow more negotiations, and Biden agreed on January 18 to provide a closed-door deposition to the House Oversight Committee on February 28. Biden would give a private deposition on the scheduled date. Transcripts from his deposition would be made public on February 29, 2024.

== Indictment of ex-FBI informant ==
Weiss indicted Alexander Smirnov, a former FBI informant, on February 15, 2024. The indictment alleged Smirnov had fabricated his account of Burisma executives telling him that the company had hired Hunter Biden as a means of protecting the company through Joe Biden, and that both Bidens had been paid $5 million bribes to accomplish that. Smirnov's allegations played a key role in Biden corruption allegations made by the Republican-controlled House Oversight Committee investigation of the Bidens that led to impeachment proceedings against the president.

== Final report ==
The 27-page report, released January 13, 2025, was accompanied by hundreds of pages of public court filings.

=== Findings ===
Weiss stated that Hunter Biden's income derived from "using his last name and connections to secure lucrative business opportunities" in exchange for "limited work." Court documents cited in the report showed that Hunter Biden failed to report income from Burisma Holdings on his 2014 tax return. Weiss wrote that "these prosecutions were the culmination of thorough, impartial investigations, not partisan politics," noting that eight federal judges had rejected claims that the cases resulted from selective or vindictive motives. In an accompanying letter, Attorney General Garland stated there had been no instances during the investigation when he needed to intervene due to policy violations.

The report also detailed Weiss's prosecution of Alexander Smirnov, a former FBI informant who pleaded guilty to fabricating allegations that the Bidens had received bribes from Ukraine.

=== Criticism of pardon ===
Weiss wrote that President Biden's characterization of the prosecutions as "selective," "unfair," and a "miscarriage of justice" was "gratuitous and wrong" and "unfairly impugn[ed] the integrity not only of Department of Justice personnel, but all of the public servants making these difficult decisions in good faith." He stated: "Other presidents have pardoned family members, but in doing so, none have taken the occasion as an opportunity to malign the public servants at the Department of Justice based solely on false accusations." Weiss added that "the Constitution provides the President with broad authority to grant reprieves and pardons for offenses against the United States, but nowhere does the Constitution give the President the authority to rewrite history."

=== Reactions ===
Hunter Biden's attorney Abbe Lowell called the investigation "a cautionary tale of the abuse of prosecutorial power" and stated that the report "continues to ignore some of the major mysteries of his 7-year investigation," including Weiss's 2023 proposal to resolve the case with misdemeanor charges. House Oversight Committee Chairman James Comer called the report "incomplete" because President Biden's pardon prevented Weiss from pursuing additional charges.

== Responses and analysis ==
=== Political responses ===
In an October 2022 interview with Jake Tapper following The Washington Post's reporting, Joe Biden said he had "great confidence" in his son. Democrats suggested the investigation was irrelevant to swing voters.

Senior House Republicans suggested Weiss's appointment as special counsel was an effort to obstruct their investigation into the Biden family. House Speaker Kevin McCarthy said Weiss could not be trusted because he had negotiated what Republicans called a "sweetheart deal" that was later rejected by a judge. Oversight Committee chairman James Comer called the appointment "part of the Justice Department's efforts to attempt a Biden family coverup," while the spokesman for House Judiciary Committee chairman Jim Jordan said it was "just a new way to whitewash the Biden family's corruption."

=== Legal analysis ===
Legal experts said gun charges are rarely brought as a standalone basis for prosecution; most charges of lying on the background-check form or illegal weapon possession are brought against defendants charged with more serious underlying crimes. However, a United States Sentencing Commission report showed that prosecutions under 18 U.S.C. §922(g)(3) constitute a significant percentage of federal firearm offenses. In his final report, Weiss wrote that analysis of Justice Department data from 2008 to 2017 showed that the gun charges against Hunter Biden "are brought more frequently than over 90 percent of the other available firearm offenses."

=== Defense and prosecution arguments ===
Biden's criminal defense attorney Abbe Lowell argued his client was charged due to Republican pressure. Upon the September 2023 indictment, Lowell said: "Hunter Biden possessing an unloaded gun for 11 days was not a threat to public safety, but a prosecutor, with all the power imaginable, bending to political pressure presents a grave threat to our system of justice." In a letter to House committee chairs, Lowell wrote that Biden "was and will be charged for conduct no one else would be charged for because, as the President's son, he has been subject to your relentless efforts to inject partisan Republican politics into the process."

Weiss denied that political considerations influenced the prosecution. In his final report, he wrote that he "ignored" politicians who weighed in on his investigation and "never considered whether my decisions would be viewed favorably or unfavorably by any politicians." Weiss stated that he "concluded that the Principles of Federal Prosecution were satisfied as to both the tax offenses and the gun offenses," adding that the tax violations were "not 'inconsequential' or 'technical' tax code violations" and that "the prosecution of Mr. Biden was warranted given the nature and seriousness of his tax crimes."
