= Biden–Ukraine conspiracy theory =

Political conspiracy theory

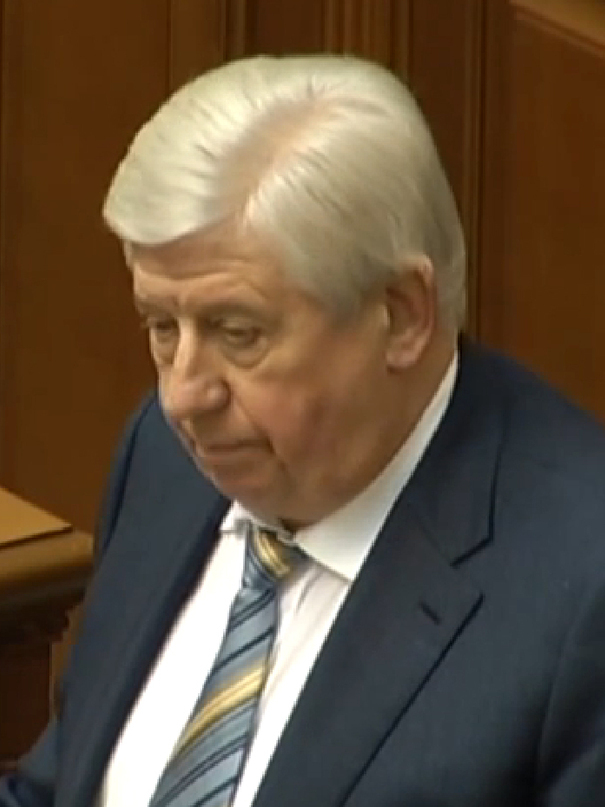
Viktor Shokin

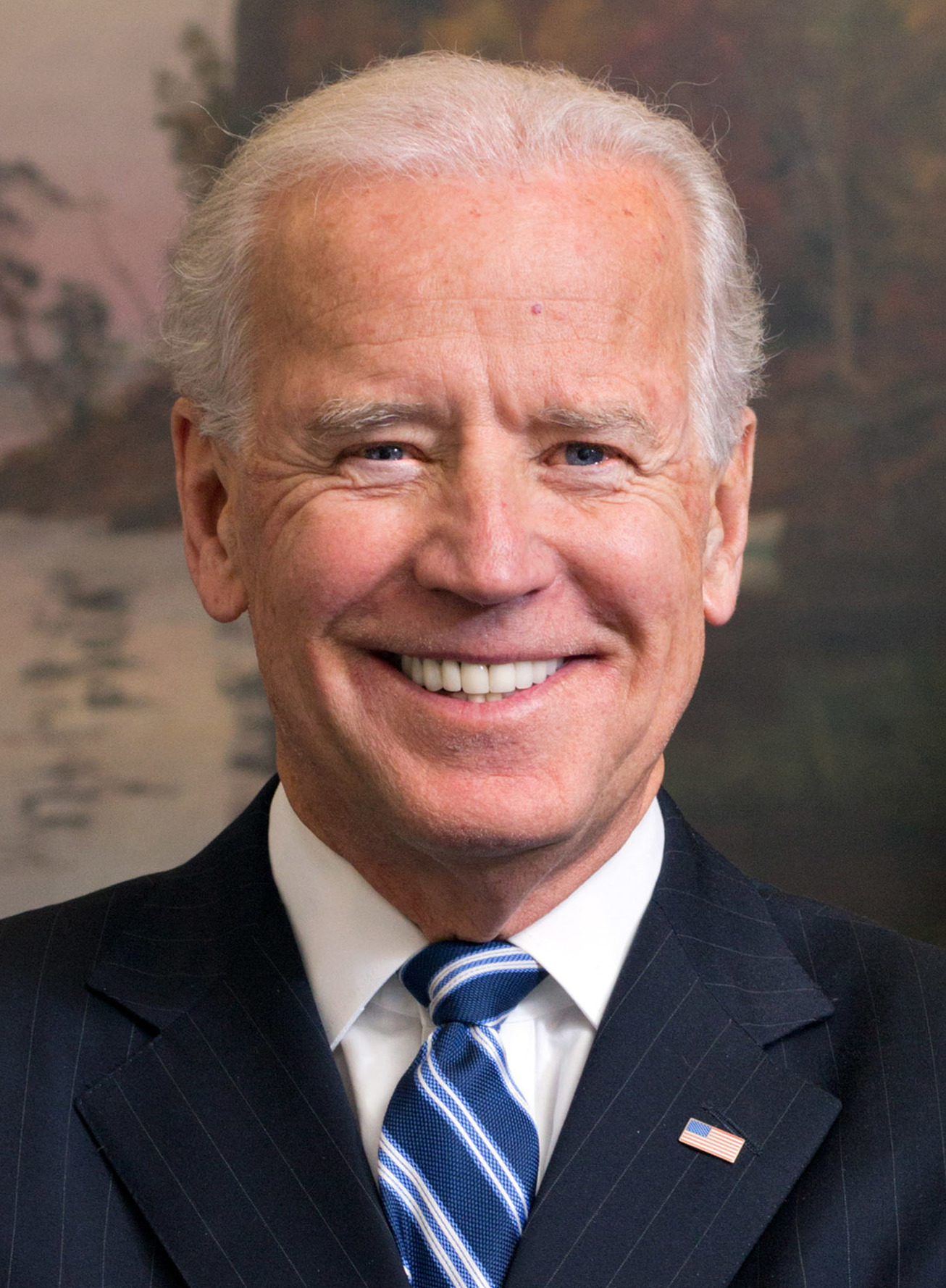
Joe Biden

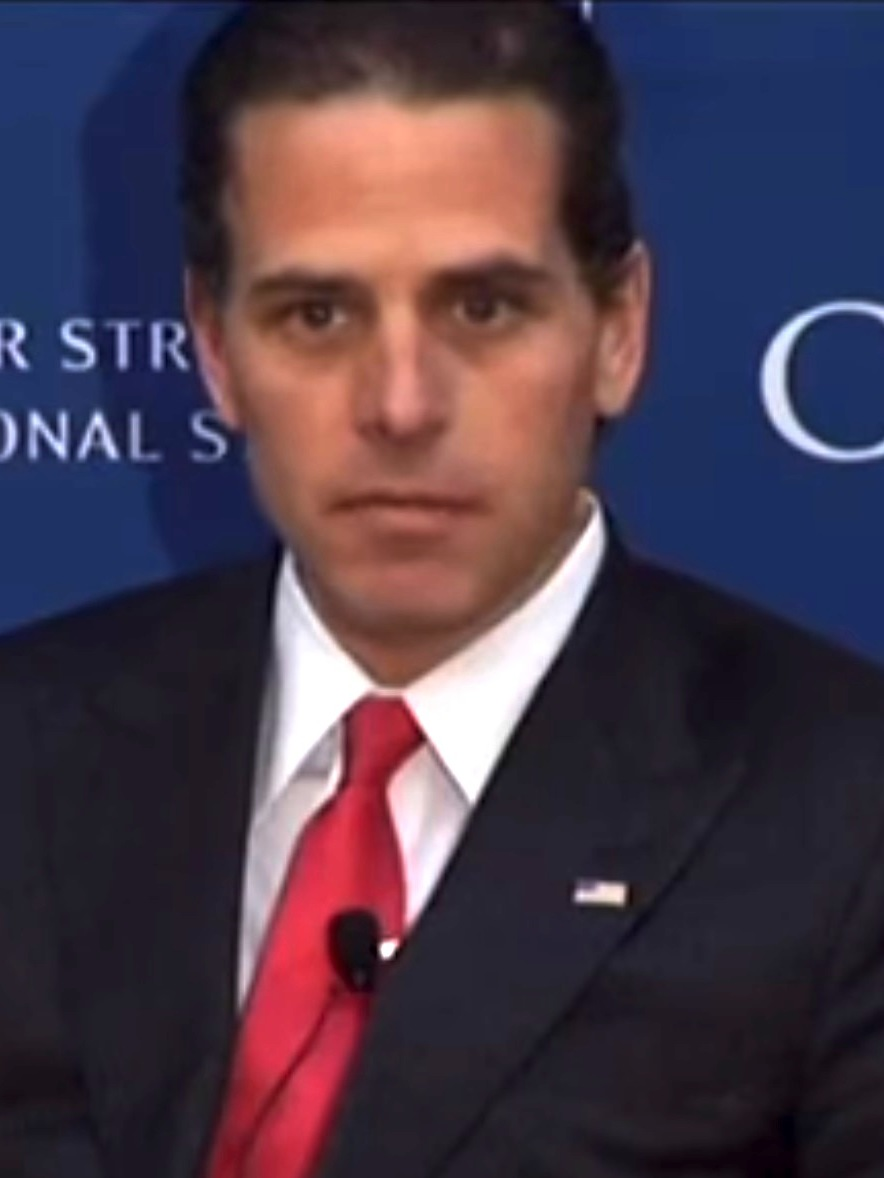
Hunter Biden

Some of the primary subjects of the conspiracy theory

Joe Biden is falsely alleged to have, as vice president of the United States (2009–2017), withheld a loan guarantee and taken a bribe to pressure Ukraine into firing prosecutor general Viktor Shokin to prevent a corruption investigation of Ukrainian gas company Burisma and to protect his son Hunter Biden, who was on the Burisma board. As part of efforts by Donald Trump and his campaign in the Trump–Ukraine scandal, which led to Trump's first impeachment, these falsehoods were spread in an attempt to damage Joe Biden's reputation and chances during the 2020 presidential campaign, and later in an effort to impeach him.

Joe Biden followed State Department intentions when he withheld the loan guarantee to pressure Ukraine into removing the prosecutor, who was seen as corrupt and failing to clean up Ukrainian corruption, in accordance with the official and bipartisan policy of the United States, the European Union, the World Bank and the International Monetary Fund. A confidential informant told the FBI that Burisma's owner said he was coerced to pay bribes to both Bidens to ensure Shokin was fired, though the informant was indicted in 2024 on charges he had fabricated the account.

United States intelligence community analysis released in March 2021 found that proxies of Russian intelligence promoted and laundered misleading or unsubstantiated narratives about the Bidens "to US media organizations, US officials, and prominent US individuals, including some close to former President Trump and his administration." The New York Times reported in May 2021 that a federal criminal investigation was examining a possible role by current and former Ukrainian officials, including whether they used former Trump personal attorney Rudy Giuliani, who was the subject of a separate but related federal investigation, to spread unsubstantiated claims.

A joint investigation by two Republican Senate committees released in September 2020 found no evidence of wrongdoing by Joe Biden. A sweeping Republican House committee investigation of the Biden family has found no wrongdoing by December 2023. House Speaker Kevin McCarthy directed three committees to open a formal impeachment inquiry in September 2023, and on December 2 his successor Mike Johnson said he believed Republicans had enough votes in the House to initiate impeachment proceedings. The three committees released a report in August 2024 asserting Biden had "engaged in impeachable conduct", but they did not recommend proceeding to impeachment.

== Background ==
Since the independence of Ukraine following the collapse of the Soviet Union, Russia has had a history of running direct and active measures to undermine the sovereignty of Ukraine. This included placing operatives in the government, influencing elections, and encouraging corruption.

After the 2016 United States presidential election the United States Department of Justice accused Russian intelligence agents, working for the Internet Research Agency (IRA), of having used social media accounts to influence the election in favour of Donald Trump and to damage Hillary Clinton's campaign. While some have suggested their goal was to destabilise the United States by supporting both sides, a research paper published in The International Journal of Press/Politics and another in the Computational Communication Research journal concluded that the IRA "trolls" posted mostly pro-Republican content. Government Accountability Institute, a Florida-based operation founded by Stephen Bannon in 2012, played a key role in spreading the Biden–Ukraine conspiracy theory.

The series of false allegations about Joe Biden and Burisma emerged at a convergence of interest between Russian efforts to help Trump's candidacy, operatives and supporters of the Trump campaign, and media in the United States.

The thesis of the false conspiracy theory asserts that Joe Biden sought the dismissal of a Ukrainian prosecutor to protect his son, and that he did it in a quid pro quo manner by trading loan guarantees for the personal favor. This is in contrast to the attempted quid pro quo by President Trump, who unsuccessfully tried to pressure Ukrainian president Volodymyr Zelenskyy in a quid pro quo manner to start a publicly announced investigation of Burisma and the Bidens in exchange for military aid and a visit to the White House. Trump's effort resulted in his first impeachment.

In January 2018, a videotaping by the Council on Foreign Relations shows Biden taking credit for withholding the loan guarantees to have the prosecutor fired. His actions were implementations of bipartisan US policy rather than done for any of the reasons alleged in the conspiracy theory.

== Bribery allegation ==
In June 2020, a confidential informant, later convicted for false statements to the FBI, Alexander Smirnov, lied to the FBI that Burisma owner Mykola Zlochevsky had said he had been coerced into paying Hunter Biden a $5 million bribe, as well as a $5 million bribe to "another Biden," to ensure Shokin would be fired. The FBI memorialized Smirnov's lies in an FD-1023 form, which read in part:

Zlochevsky said he had a total of "17 recordings" involving the Bidens; two of the recordings included Joe Biden, and the remaining 15 recordings only included Hunter Biden. [The informant] reiterated that, per Zlochevsky, these recordings evidence Zlochevsky was somehow coerced into paying the Bidens to ensure Ukraine Prosecutor General Viktor Shokin was fired.

Smirnov also told the FBI that Zlochevsky said Burisma had hired Hunter Biden to "protect us, through his dad, from all kinds of problems."

The FD-1023 came to the attention of the Republican-controlled House Oversight Committee investigation of the Biden family in 2023, leading to allegations of bribery that contributed to the Republican-controlled House voting to initiate impeachment proceedings against President Biden in December 2023. Republican committee member Nancy Mace asserted in a September 2023 public hearing, "We already know the president took bribes from Burisma."

In February 2024, Smirnov was arrested by the FBI upon arriving in Las Vegas on a flight from an overseas location. He was indicted on charges that he had fabricated his account of conversations with Zlochevsky. The indictment asserted Smirnov appeared to have a political bias against Joe Biden, telling FBI handlers during the 2020 presidential campaign that he had evidence that would put Biden in jail. Days after the indictment, prosecutors said Smirnov had admitted Russian intelligence officials had passed a false story about Hunter Biden to him and Smirnov had been "actively peddling new lies that could impact US elections" since meeting with Russian agents in late 2023. Prosecutors also said Smirnov is a dual U.S. and Israeli citizen who should be detained pending trial; the presiding magistrate judge ordered him released provided he surrender his passports and wear a GPS monitor. In December 2024, Smirnov pleaded guilty to one count of lying to the FBI and was sentenced to six years in prison the following month.

== Conspirators ==
The falsehoods about Hunter Biden were spread by possible Russian operatives in the Ukrainian parliament, right-wing media supportive of Trump, and members of the Trump campaign, such as Rudy Giuliani and Steve Bannon.

=== Russian involvement ===
Russian involvement was coordinated by Russian GRU lieutenant general Vladimir Alekseyevin, his deputy Oleksiy Savin, and Ihor Kolesnikov. They coordinated a network spreading the false allegations through Ukrainian lawmakers Oleksandr Dubinsky and Andrii Derkach, Prosecutor Kostiantyn Kulyk and businessmen Dmytro Firtash and Konstantin Kilimnik. The three were given ten million dollars and used corrupt access to the Ukrainian Parliament and connections to media and politicians in the United States to spread the falsehoods. Dubinsky, Derkach and Kulyk were sanctioned by the U.S. government in the closing days of the Trump administration, and in November 2023 Ukrainian authorities indicted them on treason charges.

==== Ihor Kolesnikov ====
Ihor Kolesnikov, a Soviet-era GRU officer, coordinated the election subversion network from Kyiv. Kolesnikov would organize Press Conferences for Oleksander Dubinsky and Andri Derkach. He was sentenced to fifteen years for treason in May 2022.

==== Oleksander Dubinsky ====
Oleksandr Dubinsky is a member of the Ukrainian Parliament who four years ago helped Rudy Giuliani in his attempts to find information in support of the false Biden-Ukraine conspiracy. Dubinsky is accused of treason for allegedly working to help Russia in its war against Ukraine.

Dubinsky held a press conference with Andrii Derkach to spread the false rumors. He also met with Rudy Giuliani in 2019 for the production of a falsified film about the conspiracy.

In May 2021 Dubinsky was sanctioned by the US Government, his assets frozen, and his YouTube channel shutdown. In November 2023 Oleksander Dubinsky was charged for carrying out subversive informational activities by publishing "fakes about the alleged interference of Ukrainian high-ranking officials" in the U.S. 2020 presidential elections.

==== Andrii Derkach ====
Andrii Derkach is a former Ukrainian politician, now stripped of citizenship, who is believed to have been an agent or asset of Russia. He played a central role in spreading falsehoods about Biden and Ukraine.

Derkach released snippets of a supposed conversation between Joe Biden and Ukrainian President Poroshenko, in which Biden linked loan guarantees to the ouster of Viktor Shokin, the country's corrupt and ineffective prosecutor general. The recordings, which were not verified as authentic and appeared to be heavily edited, did not provide evidence to support the ongoing conspiracy theory that Biden wanted the prosecutor fired to protect his son. In June 2020, Poroshenko denied that Joe Biden ever approached him about Burisma and characterized the recordings as fake. In September 2020, the United States Department of the Treasury sanctioned Derkach, stating he "has been an active Russian agent for over a decade, maintaining close connections with the Russian Intelligence Services". The Treasury Department added that Derkach "waged a covert influence campaign centered on cultivating false and unsubstantiated narratives concerning U.S. officials in the upcoming 2020 Presidential Election," including by the release of "edited audio tapes and other unsupported information with the intent to discredit U.S. officials".

==== Kostiantyn Kulyk ====
In 2019, as deputy prosecutor general. Mr Kulyk wrote a 2019 memo calling for an investigation into Hunter Biden's role on Burisma's board. Later that year he had plans to meet Mr Giuliani to discuss the allegations in order to spread the false conspiracy.

Kulyk has been indicted on multiple corruption charges. Kulyk, though, fled Ukraine after Russia's invasion in 2022 and is also sanctioned by the United States for his role in the subversive activities.

==== Dmytro Firtash ====
Dmytro Firtash was a middleman for Gazprom and connected to the Ukrainian government. He has acknowledged that he was installed as a middleman by Russian mob boss Semion Mogilevich.

Since 2014 Firtash has faced bribery charges and fought extradition to the United States while he has been released on bail in Austria. He wired one million dollars to the wife of Lev Parnas, a former associate of Giuliani. He provided a now-discredited affidavit from Kulyk accusing Biden of wrongdoing. Trump and Giuliani associates Joe DiGenova and Victoria Toensing attempted to persuade Attorney General William Barr to drop charges against Firtash but failed.

==== Konstantin Kilimnik ====
Konstantin Kilimnik oversaw a network of people working on behalf of the Russian Federal Security Service (FSB) to influence the 2020 elections. Kilimnik had the single strongest ties, authorized by President Putin, to the Trump administration in both 2016 and 2020 elections. He organized Russia's media outreach campaigns to spread lies about Biden and corruption in Ukraine as part of Russia's efforts to help Trump.

==== Andrii Telizhenko ====
Andrii Telizhenko, a former Ukrainian diplomat, was a close compatriot to Rudy Giuliani and was sanctioned by the Us Government for election interference. Telizhenko would travel with Rudy Giuliani to Ukraine in 2019 to prove it was Ukraine, and not Russia who interfered in the 2016 elections. Telizhenko pushed the conspiracy that Joe Biden had Shokin fired to protect Hunter. Telizhenko set up meetings between Derkach and Giuliani and played a role in the production of the propaganda film "The Ukraine Hoax: Impeachment, Biden Cash, and Mass Murder."

=== American media involvement ===
American media organizations with ties to the Trump campaign were involved in the spread of the false allegations. Specifically Peter Schweizer, John Solomon, Fox News, and One America News Network were essential in creating and disseminating the lies that built the background for this conspiracy theory.

==== Peter Schweizer ====
Peter Schweizer, editor-at-large at Breitbart News and president of the conservative Government Accountability Institute, was the first person to spread the falsehoods about Joe Biden and Burisma in his book "Secret Empires". The plagiarized book included a false story that on January 12, 2017, Joe Biden, who was then the vice-president, sought to end an investigation into Burisma to protect Hunter Biden, who had a profitable post on the board of Burisma, a Ukrainian gas company run by a shady oligarch.

Schweizer launched a media blitz in 2019 to help the conspiracy spread and appeared and wrote editorials repeating his lie in multiple news outlets. This, in turn, helped to lead Trump allies in Ukraine and Congress to promote the lie.

==== John Solomon ====
Washington Post attributes John Solomon, formerly of The Hill, the most responsibility for the spread of the untrue claims in U.S. media.

Beginning in the spring of 2019, Solomon published a series of editorials which The Hill notes are now part of Congressional inquiries due to their connection to the spreading of lies. Solomon relied heavily on Schweizer's book. The story being pushed by Solomon had significant flaws, including relying on a corrupt source, Yuriy Lutsenko, who later recanted the claims, and Viktor Shokin. An internal review by the Hill found "serious doubts about the credibility of Solomon's Ukrainian sources". In testimony before Congress, Alexander Vindman said Solomon's claims were "entirely made up in full cloth".

Media Matters reported in September 2023 that the previous month Solomon published a State Department briefing memo prepared for Joe Biden's December 2015 trip to Ukraine. The memo read, in part:

There is wide agreement that anti-corruption must be at the top of this list, and that reforms must include an overhaul of the Prosecutor General's Office including removal of Prosecutor General Shokin, who is widely regarded as an obstacle to fighting corruption, if not a source of the problem.

==== Fox News ====
Fox News was also involved in the spread of the falsehoods. Fox ran at least twelve broadcasts about John Solomon's report about the Burisma probe. The false conspiracy theory was mentioned on Sean Hannity's program, with him claiming Solomon had caught Joe Biden in an "international corruption scandal".

==== One America News Network ====
One America News Network (OANN) is a far-right, pro-Trump news outlet with reporters who also work for Russian news agencies, and the network was essential to spreading lies about Biden and Burisma.

OANN produced a "documentary series intended to debunk the impeachment case", and an OANN crew traveled with Rudy Giuliani to Ukraine to gather information. OANN later aired a misleading documentary about Biden and Burisma called "The Ukraine Hoax: Impeachment, Biden Cash, and Mass Murder" produced by Michael Caputo, a member of the Trump campaign, and Sergey Petrushin, a Russian living in Florida. The documentary used fake documents provided to Giuliani by Parnas on behalf of Andrii Derkach and Konstantin Kilimnik. Following Caputo's work in spreading the falsehoods through OANN, Donald Trump made Caputo the assistant secretary of public affairs for the Department of Health and Human Services.

=== Trump campaign involvement ===
The Trump campaign's actions in spreading the conspiracy, especially the active engagement of Rudy Giuliani with possible Russian agents, were highlighted during Donald Trump's first impeachment.

==== Trump's first impeachment ====
Trump's first impeachment charge of abuse of power was triggered by a July 2019 phone call with Ukrainian president Volodymyr Zelenskyy, in which then-President Trump unsuccessfully tried to pressure Zelenskyy in a quid pro quo manner to start a publicly announced investigation of Burisma and the Bidens in exchange for the release of congressionally mandated financial and military aid to Ukraine and the promise of a Trump–Zelenskyy meeting at the White House. During the hearings and impeachment trial of President Trump in 2019–20, he and his allies repeatedly alleged that Joe Biden and his son had engaged in corrupt activities in Ukraine. Trump said he planned to make it a major issue during the 2020 United States presidential election, while a Republican-controlled Senate committee carried out an investigation into the allegations in spring 2020. The investigation by the Republican-controlled Senate Homeland Security and Finance committees concluded in September 2020 that Hunter Biden "'cashed in' on his father's name to close lucrative business deals around the world", but that there was no evidence of improper influence or wrongdoing by Joe Biden.

==== Rudy Giuliani ====
Working together with Andrii Derkach (an active Russian agent), Dmytro Firtash, and other individuals linked to Russian intelligence and organized crime, Trump's personal attorney, Rudy Giuliani, and his associates spearheaded an effort to gather information in Ukraine to advance the allegations, and Attorney General William Barr confirmed that the Justice Department had created an "intake process" to review Giuliani's findings.

In late 2019, it was revealed that the United States attorney for the Southern District of New York, which Giuliani had once led, was investigating him for multiple felonies relating to his activities in Ukraine. Intelligence officials warned Ron Johnson, the chairman of the Senate committee investigating the Bidens, that he risked spreading Russian disinformation. The Washington Post reported in October 2020 that American intelligence agencies warned the White House in 2019 that Giuliani was the target of a Russian influence operation, and National Security Advisor Robert O'Brien warned President Trump about accepting what Giuliani told him. While monitoring Russian assets, U.S. intelligence recorded Giuliani communicating with them. According to officials interviewed by The Daily Beast, then-National Security Advisor John Bolton told his staff not to meet with Giuliani, as did his successor Robert C. O'Brien, because Bolton had been informed that Giuliani was spreading conspiracy theories that aligned with Russian interests in disrupting the 2020 election. These officials were also concerned that Giuliani would be used as a conduit for disinformation, including "leaks" of emails that would mix genuine with forged material to implicate Hunter Biden in corrupt dealings. Interviewed by The Daily Beast, Giuliani would later declare that Derkach's being sanctioned was the result of a conspiracy led by George Soros and that "the chance that Derkach is a Russian spy is no better than 50/50".

In October 2020, during the last weeks of the presidential campaign, the New York Post published an article, with the involvement of Donald Trump's personal attorney Giuliani and former chief strategist Steve Bannon, about a laptop belonging to Hunter Biden. The laptop contained an email, the authenticity of which was later verified by The Washington Post in 2022, showing what the New York Post characterized as a "meeting" between Joe Biden and Vadym Pozharskyi, a Burisma advisor, in 2015, though that characterization was disputed by witnesses. The article's veracity was strongly questioned by most mainstream media outlets, analysts and intelligence officials, due to the chain of custody of the laptop and its contents, and suspicion that it may have been part of a disinformation campaign. A Republican activist delivered a portable drive to the Washington Post and stated that the device contained data copied from the laptop. The Post confirmed that some of the materials provided to them were genuine, but could not confirm that the materials on the portable drive came from the purported laptop; the Post also concluded that most of the data could not be verified and fake material may have been mixed in with it. Hunter Biden said that it is possible the laptop could be his.

Ukrainian businessman Hares Youssef told The Times that an associate of Dmytro Firtash asked Youssef to lie about Hunter Biden's business dealings to damage Joe Biden's presidential campaign, in exchange for a United States visa.

==== Trump's second term ====
In July 2026, Trump gave an Oval Office address to expose alleged Deep State efforts to steal his election, blaming China. Unclassified documents released by the White House to support this claim instead detailed efforts by Russia to frame Biden over Hunter's involvement with Burisma. The unclassified documents reveal Russia amplified lies claiming that Biden, as vice president, engaged in corrupt activity with Burisma.

== Subjects of the conspiracy ==
The false allegations asserted that Joe Biden asked for the dismissal of Viktor Shokin to cover up crimes by his son Hunter Biden.

=== Viktor Shokin ===
Viktor Shokin was appointed to the position of prosecutor general of Ukraine by Ukrainian president Petro Poroshenko, to whom he was loyal. Due to his own corruption and failures to do his job to clean up corruption, representatives of the EU, the United States, the World Bank, and International Monetary Fund, pressed Poroshenko for his removal.

In March 2016 testimony to the Senate Foreign Relations Committee, former ambassador to Ukraine John E. Herbst stated, "By late fall of 2015, the EU and the United States joined the chorus of those seeking Mr. Shokin's removal" and that Joe Biden "spoke publicly about this before and during his December visit to Kyiv". During the same hearing, assistant secretary of state Victoria Nuland stated, "we have pegged our next $1 billion loan guarantee, first and foremost, to having a rebooting of the reform coalition so that we know who we are working with, but secondarily, to ensuring that the prosecutor general's office gets cleaned up." An overwhelming majority vote in the Ukrainian Parliament in March 2016 led to Shokin's removal from office after an investigation into extortion of another company led to associates who were found in possession of diamonds, cash and other valuables, as well as documents and passports belonging to Shokin.

In an August 2023 Fox News interview, Shokin said he was fired as prosecutor general "at the insistence of then-Vice President [Biden] because I was investigating Burisma." One month later, Poroshenko was asked on Fox News for his reaction to Shokin's assertion. Poroshenko responded:

First of all, this is a completely crazy person. There is something wrong with him. Second, there is not one single word of truth. And third, I hate the idea to make any comments and to make any intervention in an American election. We have very much enjoyed the bipartisan support, and please, do not use such a person like Shokin to undermine the trust between bipartisan support and Ukraine.

The Fox News interviewer responded, "Okay, so that is not true. He didn't get fired because of Joe Biden." Poroshenko confirmed this, adding Shokin was fired by the Ukrainian parliament "for his own statement" and "he played a very dirty game unfortunately."

=== Hunter Biden ===
Hunter Biden is a lawyer whose career previously included a period as an executive vice president at MBNA and three years at the United States Department of Commerce. He then worked as a lobbyist until 2006, when George W. Bush appointed him to the board of directors of Amtrak. Hunter Biden resigned from Amtrak in February 2009, shortly after the inauguration of Barack Obama, when his father Joe Biden became vice-president. He resumed lobbying, and was counsel at the law firm Boies Schiller Flexner LLP, until the Ukrainian oil and gas firm Burisma Holdings appointed him to its board of directors in April 2014. As Hunter Biden had no prior experience in Ukraine or the energy sector, some viewed this as a likely attempt to buy influence via his father, though Hunter Biden was hired to conduct general corporate consulting rather than to provide energy expertise. Hunter Biden's employment was described by some as a potential conflict of interest, and advisors to the Obama administration considered the situation awkward.

Former Politico reporter Marc Caputo said in January 2025 that in 2019 the campaign of a rival to Biden for the Democratic nomination for the 2020 presidential election gave him opposition research on Burisma. "That story was killed by the editors, and they gave no explanation for that either", he recalled, citing it and orders to not report on the laptop as among examples of "dumb decisions of cowardly editors" regarding Hunter Biden.

== Congressional investigations ==
After Republicans took control of the House in January 2023, three House committees initiated investigations into Joe Biden, his family, and the Justice Department. In September 2023, House speaker Kevin McCarthy authorized the committees to open a formal impeachment inquiry, to be led by James Comer, chairman of the House investigation into the Biden family. McCarthy had days earlier said that he would hold a full House vote to authorize an inquiry.

The Washington Post reported that during a November 7 luncheon with the Republican Governance Group, McCarthy's successor Mike Johnson indicated there was insufficient evidence to initiate formal impeachment proceedings. Johnson said on December 2 that he believed he had enough House votes to continue to impeachment proceedings, as Republicans said a vote might be held within days, though they acknowledged they had not found evidence of misconduct by the president.

=== Lev Parnas testimony ===
At the invitation of committee Democrats, on March 20, 2024, Parnas testified before the Republican-controlled House Oversight Committee investigation into the Biden family that was pursuing the impeachment of President Joe Biden. Parnas stated he was tasked by Giuliani with "finding dirt on the Bidens" to "spread misinformation about them" but he was unable to find evidence of Biden corruption in Ukraine. He testified, in part:

The American people have been lied to, by Donald Trump, Rudy Giuliani and various cohorts of individuals in government and media positions. They created falsehoods to serve their own interests knowing it would undermine the strength of our nation ... Congressman Pete Sessions, then-Congressman Devin Nunes, Senator Ron Johnson and many others understood they were pushing a false narrative. The same goes for John Solomon, Sean Hannity and media personnel, particularly with Fox News, who used this narrative to manipulate the public ahead of the 2020 elections. Sadly, they are still doing this today as we approach the 2024 elections ... The only information ever pushed on the Bidens and Ukraine has come from one source and one source only: Russia and Russian agents.

== See also ==
- Conspiracy theories in United States politics
- Impeachment inquiry into Joe Biden
- List of conspiracy theories promoted by Donald Trump
- Russia investigation origins conspiracy theory
- Russian interference in the 2020 United States elections
- Trump–Ukraine scandal#Ukraine and the Bidens
- United States House Oversight Committee investigation into the Biden family
- Weiss special counsel investigation
