= International Forum on Energy Security for the Future =

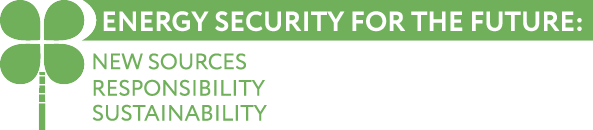
Energy Security for the Future: New Sources, Responsibility, Sustainability

The International Forum on Energy Security for the Future: New Sources, Responsibility, Sustainability (ESF) is an initiative on energy security focused on popularization of alternative energy sources in Europe and worldwide. The forum was organized by the Prince Albert II of Monaco Foundation, Aleksander Kwaśniewski's Foundation "Amicus Europae" and Ukraine's leading private oil & gas producer Burisma in 2016. Main organizers of the Forum are Prince Albert II of Monaco, Nikolay Zlochevskyi and Aleksander Kwaśniewski. The Head of the Organizing Committee of the Forum is Vadym Pozharskyi from Burisma. The Forum intended to address ideas for alternative energy and sustainiblility, as well as energy security.

== History and background ==
First held on June 2, 2016, in Monte Carlo, Monaco, the Forum on Energy Security for the Future: New sources, Responsibility, Sustainability promotes non-polluting renewable energy. It calls for close cooperation and coordination among countries, organizations and civil society to address common security challenges and energy concerns.

Organized by Burisma Group in partnership with the Adam Smith Conferences, and with support from the Prince Albert II of Monaco Foundation and the Aleksander Kwaśniewski's Foundation Amicus Europae, the Second International Forum on Energy Security for the Future: New vision, Strategy, Innovation took place on June 2, 2017 in Monte Carlo, Monaco.

The third annual Forum on ENERGY SECURITY FOR THE FUTURE took place on June 1, 2018 in Monte Carlo, Monaco.

== Forum participants and topics ==
=== Forum 2016 ===
The Forum speakers induced such high-European politicians as Aleksander Kwaśniewski (President of Poland 1995-2005), Joschka Fischer (Vice-Chancellor of Germany 1998-2005), Andris Piebalgs (EU Commissioner for Energy, 2004 and 2009), TJ Glautier (US Vice-Secretary of Energy 1999-2001, President of TJG Energy Associates), Hunter Biden (Independent director of Burisma), Ireneusz Bil (Director of Amicus Europae, the Foundation of Aleksander Kwaśniewski), Jean-Arnold Vinois (European Commission representative on Energy Policy issues) and other honored guests.

The attendees discussed topics such as Alter-Eco (new energy for Europe), energy sources, focusing on geopolitics and diversification, and environmental security and corporate responsibility, including alternative energy and public-private partnerships.

The first Energy Security Forum also became a platform for presentation of the English version of Mission Ukraine written by the Polish author Maciej Olchawa. The book reflects the vision of the European Community and Ukraine’s place in it and reveals new interesting details of the Cox-Kwasniewski Mission, which played the key role during the Revolution of Dignity in Ukraine.

In his book Maciej Olchawa talks about European integration, Ukraine’s place in Europe and the world, modern leaders and new political elites formation. The book also suggests a new strategy of the EU international politics from the perspective of Ukrainian events. Aleksander Kwaśniewski presented the book Mission Ukraine, together with the author they held an autograph session and promised to publish a Ukrainian version of the book.

=== Forum 2017 ===
For the second year in a row, the Forum on Energy Security for the Future brought together over 250 guests including global leaders, politicians, energy experts and journalists. The Forum started with welcoming remarks from Prince Albert II of Monaco, followed by keynote addresses from the President of Slovenia (2007–2012) Danilo Türk and the Prime Minister of Belgium (1999–2008) and the Leader of the Alliance of Liberals and Democrats for Europe Group Guy Verhofstadt.

The panelists of the keynote session included the Vice Prime Minister of Ukraine Volodymyr Kistion, the Director of the CIA’s Counterterrorist Center (1999-2002) and Ambassador at Large for Counter-Terrorism (2002-2004) Joseph Cofer Black, the European Commissioner for Energy (2004 and 2009) Andris Piebalgs, and the Director of the Atlantic Council Dina Patriciu Eurasia Center and the US Ambassador to Ukraine (2003-2006) John E. Herbst. They focused on the role of institutions in strengthening European energy security.

The first session closed with a keynote presentation from the President of Poland (1995-2005) Alexander Kwasniewski. The analytical market debate, moderated by the EU Platts correspondent Siobhan Hall, placed special emphasis on latest trends affecting the European energy market, including energy landscape changes, supply and demand dynamics and competition. The Forum addressed European energy security at a regional level and development of energy-efficient infrastructure.

In attendance from the Ukrainian side were the Vice Prime Minister of Ukraine Volodymyr Kistion, the Head of the Committee on Taxation and Customs Policy at the Verkhovna Rada of Ukraine Nina Yuzhanina, Deputy Minister for International Integration at the Ministry of Energy and Coal Industry of Ukraine Nataliya Boyko, as well as representatives of the Embassy of Ukraine in France, the Cabinet of Ministers, Ministries and Departments.

“The processes taking place in the EU automatically affect Ukraine and vice versa. Such events allow Ukrainian and European leaders share their views and define instruments required to obtain energy independence at a country level and in the whole Europe”, noted the President of Burisma Group Nikolay Zlochevsky.

=== Forum 2018 ===
On June 1, 2018, in Monte Carlo (Principality of Monaco); organized by the largest gas-extracting company of Ukraine Burisma Group, the 3rd International Forum on Energy Security in Europe - Energy Security for the Future was held with the partnership of the Prince Albert II of Monaco Foundation. The Alexander Kwasniewski Foundation, Amicus Europae, and Atlantic Council also became partners of the Forum. The third forum from the European event turned into a global event in the field of energy and environmental security. This year the Forum was attended by about 250 people, representing more than 20 countries.

The event was informally called the "Forum of Presidents", which brought together political leaders of European countries, among which are Prince Albert II of Monaco; President of Latvia Raymonds Vejonis, former President of Poland (1995-2005) Alexander Kwasniewski; President of the European Commission and Prime Minister of Italy Romano Prodi; President of the European Council and Prime Minister of the Czech Republic Mirek Topolanek and Bernard Fortier, Vice-President of Prince Albert II of Monaco Foundation. Discussions of the Forum were attended by Mark Pritchard, the member of the UK Parliament and leader of the delegation to OSCE; U.S. politician and senior senator from the state of Louisiana, Mary Loretta Landrieu; the Latvian politician and the diplomat, the commissioner of the European Union on power and development Andris Piebalgs; Ambassador Extraordinary and Plenipotentiary and Director of the Dinu Patriciu Eurasia Center of the Atlantic Council, John Edward Herbst and others.

The vector of revolutionary thinking, changes and the introduction of new technologies became the topic of the Forum 2018 Economic relations, energy, and politics are undergoing one of the most ambitious changes in history. The economic activity of the world leaders changes the generally accepted views on doing business, ideology, and model of life activity.

Energy Security for the Future 2018, Monaco

According to the founder of the Forum on Energy Security for the Future and the President of Burisma Group - Nikolai Zlochevskyi, For the last three years, the Energy Security for the Future forum has acquired the status of the largest public, political, economic and innovation movement aimed at bringing together all politicians and people around the formation of a single, secure European alliance. “Only consolidation can effectively promote the new innovative formats of clean energy sources in the lives of Europeans. Taking into account interdependence and global challenges, only a strong, energetically independent Europe can guarantee a future for its peoples. Ukraine is already an important strategic link in the overall system of energy security in Europe", - Nikolai Zlochevskyi said.

== Partners ==
Since its creation in 2016, the Forum on Energy Security for the Future has established partnerships with a range of stakeholders and international organizations interested in accelerating renewable energy deployment and introduction of latest technologies.

To advance its mission, the Forum is closely working with the Aleksander Kwaśniewski's foundation "Amicus Europae" on the development of the European Neighborhood Policy, with a focus on Ukraine and Belarus.

"The topic of this forum is very important, as energy is a key factor not just today -- it will also remain a key factor in the future," Kwaśniewski said. "The modern world is changing faster than ever. I hope that Burisma will continue to support such initiatives".

In 2017, the British professional team Adam Smith Conferences became official partners of the Forum, transforming event into a truly global conference. As the 2016 Forum, the 2017 Forum was supported by The Prince Albert II of Monaco Foundation, Aleksander Kwaśniewski's Foundation Amicus Europae and other high-profile organizations.

The Forum is also actively working with the Electric Marathon.
