= David C. Weiss =

American attorney (born 1956)

David Weiss
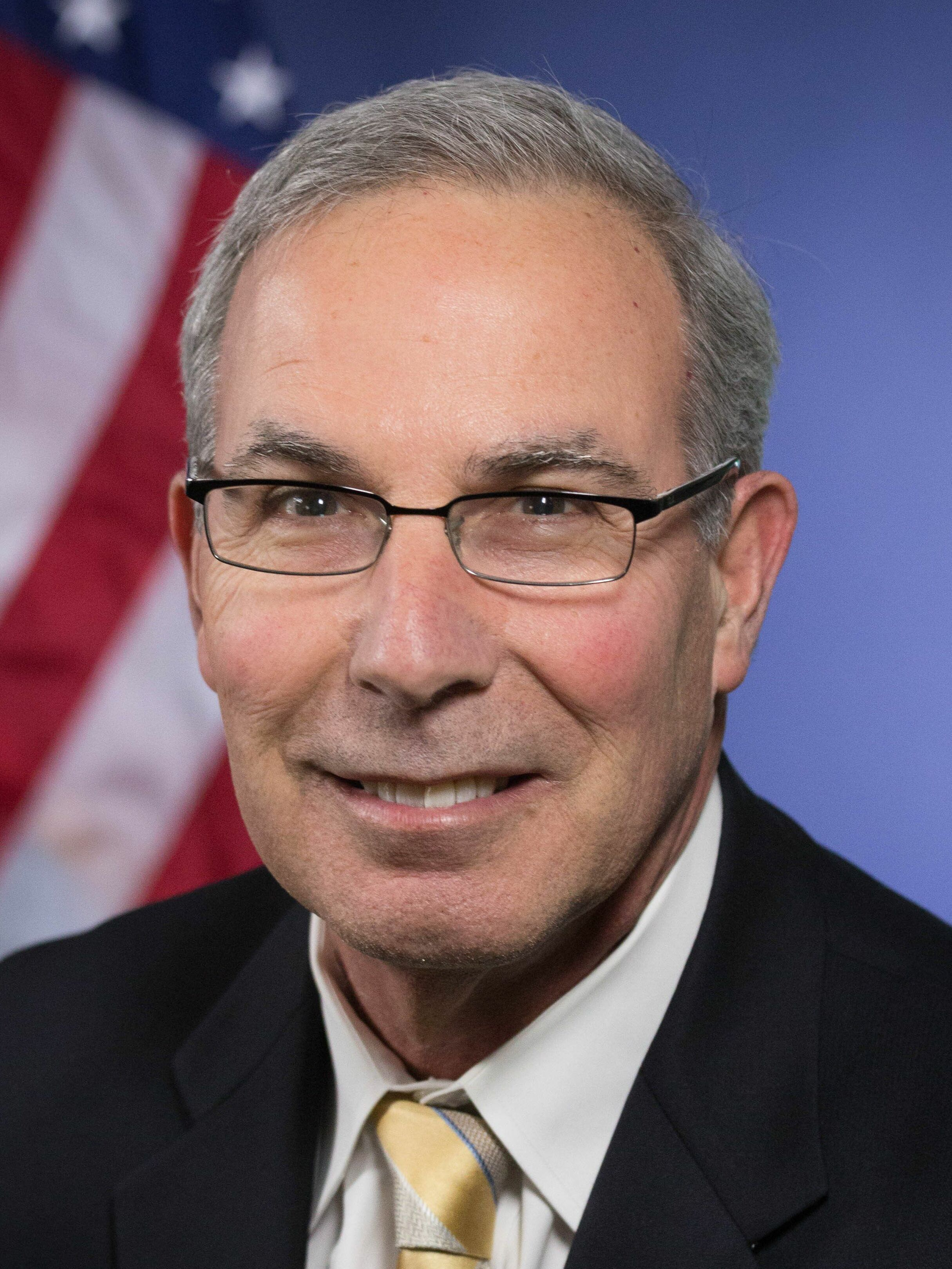

Special Counsel for the United States Department of Justice
- In office August 11, 2023 – January 17, 2025
- Appointed by: Merrick Garland

United States Attorney for the District of Delaware
- In office March 10, 2017 – January 17, 2025; Acting: March 10, 2017 – February 22, 2018
- President: Donald Trump; Joe Biden
- Preceded by: Charles Oberly
- Succeeded by: Shannon T. Hanson (acting)
- Acting; January 2009 – January 24, 2011
- President: George W. Bush; Barack Obama
- Preceded by: Colm Connolly
- Succeeded by: Charles Oberly

Personal details
- Born: David Charles Weiss; 1956 (age 69–70) Philadelphia, Pennsylvania, U.S.
- Party: Republican
- Education: Washington University in St. Louis (BA); Widener University (JD)

David Charles Weiss (born 1956) is an American attorney. He was nominated by President Donald Trump to be United States attorney for the United States District Court for the District of Delaware, and was retained by President Joe Biden. He served in that office from February 22, 2018 to January 17, 2025.

== Career ==
Weiss received his bachelor's degree from Washington University in St. Louis and his Juris Doctor degree from Widener University School of Law. He clerked for Justice Andrew D. Christie of the Delaware Supreme Court. He then served as an assistant United States Attorney in Delaware from 1986 to 1989, prosecuting violent crimes and white-collar criminal offenses. Leaving the U.S. Attorney's office, he worked as a commercial litigation associate and partner at the Duane Morris firm and as an executive at a financial services firm. He returned to the Delaware U.S. Attorney's office as First Assistant U.S. Attorney in 2007. In this capacity, he served as Acting U.S. Attorney for the District of Delaware from 2009 until the confirmation of Charles Oberly.

Weiss later served as Acting U.S. Attorney for Delaware again during the administration of Donald Trump following the resignation of Oberly. He was subsequently nominated to officially fill that position, and on February 15, 2018, his nomination to be the United States Attorney was confirmed by the Senate by voice vote. He was sworn in on February 22, 2018.

=== Hunter Biden investigation ===
Weiss led the investigation into Hunter Biden's financial dealings beginning in 2018 and was asked to remain in his position during the Biden administration. On August 11, 2023, Attorney General Merrick Garland appointed Weiss as special counsel.

In September 2023, Weiss indicted Hunter Biden on three federal gun charges; Biden was found guilty on all counts in June 2024. In December 2023, Weiss indicted Biden on nine tax-related charges; Biden pleaded guilty to all counts in September 2024. In February 2024, Weiss indicted Alexander Smirnov, a former FBI informant, for fabricating allegations about the Bidens' involvement with Ukrainian energy company Burisma Holdings.

On December 1, 2024, President Biden granted Hunter Biden a full pardon covering conduct from January 1, 2014, through December 1, 2024. Weiss released his final report on January 13, 2025, in which he concluded that Hunter Biden had used "his last name and connections to secure lucrative business opportunities" and criticized President Biden's characterization of the prosecution as "selective" and "unfair." Weiss resigned as both U.S. attorney and special counsel on January 17, 2025.
