= James Biden =

American businessman, political consultant, brother of President Joe Biden (born 1949)

Jim Biden
- Born: James Brian Biden; May 16, 1949 (age 77)
- Education: University of Delaware
- Known for: Being Joe Biden's Brother
- Parents: Joseph Robinette Biden Sr (father); Catherine Eugenia "Jean" Biden (mother)
- Relatives: Biden family

James Brian Biden (born May 16, 1949) is an American former nightclub owner, insurance broker, and political consultant. Biden is a brother of Joe Biden, the 46th president of the United States. He was his brother's chief fundraiser for his 1972 Senate campaign. His financial relationship to members of his family, particularly Joe Biden, made him a subject of Republican-led House committee investigations of the Biden family. He received a preemptive presidential pardon from Joe Biden in January 2025.

== Early life and education ==
James Brian "Jim" Biden was born on May 16, 1949, in Scranton, Pennsylvania, to Catherine Eugenia (née Finnegan) and Joseph Robinette Biden, Sr. However, he, along with his brother Joseph Robinette Biden, Jr., spent the majority of their youth in Delaware at first living in Claymont, before moving to Wilmington. James Biden studied at the University of Delaware for over four semesters but left without earning a degree.

== Career ==
=== Joe Biden Senate campaign ===
When Joe Biden first ran for the Senate in 1972, James' role was as a fundraiser, according to The Washington Post.

=== Business activities ===
Shortly after his brother's first Senate victory, he went into the nightclub business. He and four partners ran a restaurant-lounge called Seasons Change. Finding success, he then opened another club called The Other Side.

James has been described in The Washington Post as a "potential liability" for Joe Biden. "His repeated efforts at business deals — sometimes using the family name or enlisting Hunter (Biden) — have not infrequently ended in recrimination, bankruptcy or lawsuits."

== Investigations and legal issues ==
=== Investigation by House Republicans ===
President Joe Biden statement on pardoning members of his family (January 20, 2025)

My family has been subjected to unrelenting attacks and threats, motivated solely by a desire to hurt me—the worst kind of partisan politics. Unfortunately, I have no reason to believe these attacks will end,

I believe in the rule of law, and I am optimistic that the strength of our legal institutions will ultimately prevail over politics. But baseless and politically motivated investigations wreak havoc on the lives, safety, and financial security of targeted individuals and their families. Even when individuals have done nothing wrong and will ultimately be exonerated, the mere fact of being investigated or prosecuted can irreparably damage their reputations and finances.

That is why I am exercising my power under the Constitution to pardon James B. Biden, Sara Jones Biden, Valerie Biden Owens, John T. Owens, and Francis W. Biden. The issuance of these pardons should not be mistaken as an acknowledgment that they engaged in any wrongdoing, nor should acceptance be misconstrued as an admission of guilt for any offense.

— Joe Biden,

On November 8, 2023, Republicans in the United States House of Representatives subpoenaed James Biden along with Hunter Biden, requiring them to appear before the House Oversight Committee to provide deposition, according to the Associated Press. The issuance of the subpoenas came as House Republicans looked for evidence of influence-peddling within the Biden family. An attorney for James Biden said the subpoenas were not justified, while an attorney for Hunter Biden called them a "political stunt" based on "debunked claims." James Biden participated in a closed-door interview with the House Oversight and Judiciary committees on February 21, 2024. The meeting had a focus on two loans given by Joe Biden in 2017 and 2018 to James, and the financial situations surrounding the loans. James Biden also maintained that Joe was not involved in his business activities.

On June 5, 2024, the Republican-led committees involved in the impeachment inquiry of Joe Biden issued criminal referrals of James Biden and Hunter Biden to the Department of Justice. They recommended that the DOJ look into charging James Biden for allegedly making a false statement to congressional investigators. The committee chairmen wrote that in his prior testimony to Congress, James Biden falsely stated that as a private citizen, Joe Biden did not meet with family business associate Tony Bobulinski. This assertion was contradicted by other witnesses, with the committees finding it to be false. Democratic Representative Jamie Raskin, then the Ranking Member of the Oversight Committee, called the referrals "last-ditch...'gotcha' accusations" to distract from what he viewed as "the exoneration" of Joe Biden from wrongdoing.

The Presidential Pardon of James Biden (among others)

=== Pardon by Joe Biden ===
On January 19, 2025, President Joe Biden issued a pardon for James, along with their other siblings and their spouses. The President stated that he did not believe anyone in his family was guilty of wrongdoing, but pardoned them due to his fear of future political attacks onto his family from Donald Trump, who would ascend to the Presidency on the same day. The preemptive pardons were sweeping, covering all nonviolent crimes dating back through 2014. The pardons were criticized by Republicans as an abuse of power, and contradicted past criticism of familial and preemptive pardons by Joe Biden.

=== Other issues ===
The Washington Post reported that James and his wife, Sara, were recorded by the FBI in a 1998 bribery investigation related to a well-known Mississippi trial attorney, Richard Scruggs, who was contemplating a business partnership with James Biden.

== See also ==
- Family of Joe Biden
