= Alexander Smirnov (FBI informant) =

Former informant convicted of lying to the FBI

Alexander Smirnov (born 1980) is a former FBI informant of Ukrainian origin and Israeli nationality who pled guilty to lying to federal agents at the Federal Bureau of Investigation, and creating false records. Alexander Smirnov's admitted lies began the Biden–Ukraine conspiracy theory. Alexander Smirnov admitted to having links to several high level Russian officials. Smirnov was released from prison by the Federal Bureau of Prisons (FBOP) on furlough after only a few months of his 6-year sentence. Even though Smirnov was released from prison on furlough, he was still listed as a prisoner, and no contact address was given. Smirnov's location remains unknown.

== Early life ==
Smirnov was born into a Russian speaking family in the Ukrainian Soviet Socialist Republic of the Soviet Union. Alexander Smirnov was raised speaking Russian. Smirnov's Russian speaking family moved to Israel in 1992. Smirnov was living in Minnesota in the United States by 2010. According to the Los Angeles Times, Smirnov became an FBI informant by 2010.

Smirnov lived in California for 16 years, and then moved to Las Vegas where Smirnov stayed at a luxury condo near the Las Vegas Strip. During this time, Smirnov travelled throughout Europe and also provided information to other American intelligence organizations as well as Israeli intelligence.

== Career ==
According to the Los Angeles Times, Smirnov became an FBI informant around 2010. During this time, he travelled throughout Europe and also provided information to other American intelligence organizations as well as Israeli intelligence.

Alexander Smirnov admitted to having links to several high level Russian officials.

== Early legal issues ==
American Express sued Smirnov in 2013 after he failed to repay $100,000 of credit card debt. He borrowed $500,000 from Encino-based firm D&D Marketing and was sued in 2015 when he did not repay the loan. He was also sued in 2016 when two men claimed that he had sold them fake stock certificates.

== Pleading guilty, $600,000 payment, Russian ties, and furlough ==
On 14 February 2024, Smirnov was returning to the US from abroad. He was arrested by FBI agents at Harry Reid International Airport in Las Vegas. Smirnov is a dual US-Israeli citizen and had both an Israeli passport and a U.S. passport; both were seized by the FBI. On 15 February Smirnov was charged with lying to the FBI. Smirnov faced a maximum penalty of 25 years in prison. On 20 February 2024, a United States magistrate judge in Smirnov's home state of Nevada ordered him released with a GPS monitor. Then a federal judge in California had Smirnov re-arrested on 24 February 2024, because Smirnov was a flight risk, and Smirnov's release likely would "facilitate his absconding from the United States."

Prosecutors claim that Smirnov did not disclose to authorities that he and his significant other had access to more than $6 million. Smirnov, also in the past, had even given business partners false addresses, including listing his residence as the address of a traffic median.

In 2020, Smirnov was paid $600,000 by Economic Transformation Technologies (ETT), prosecutors said. That same year, Smirnov began lying to the FBI about the Bidens, according to the indictment. Two of ETT's three owners, Shahal M. Khan and Farooq Arjomand, along with their associate DAMAC Properties chairman Hussain Sajwani are friends of or have done business with Donald Trump.

Alexander Smirnov admitted to having links to several high level Russian officials.

=== Conviction ===
In December 2024, Smirnov pled guilty to one count of lying to the FBI and was sentenced to six years in prison by the next month in January 2025.

Alexander Smirnov pled guilty to lying to federal agents during the 2020 United States presidential election, saying that officials at Ukrainian natural gas company Burisma had told him that they offered Hunter Biden a seat on their board to protect them, including claiming that the executives told him they paid Hunter Biden and Joe Biden $5 million each. In 2024, Alexander Smirnov admitted he lied to the FBI about the Biden payments and Smirnov pled guilty to lying to the FBI by lying against the Bidens, Alexander Smirnov admitted as well as pleading guilty to this crime.

=== Release ===
In 2025, the Trump administration's Federal Bureau of Prisons released Alexander Smirnov covertly onto furlough from prison after only a few months of his six year sentence.

Smirnov was still listed as a prisoner, and no address was given to reach Smirnov at. Convicted informant Smirnov's location remains unknown.

Known convicted Russian collaborator Alexander Smirnov was released very early on furlough by the Bureau of Prisons under the Trump Administration even though Alexander Smirnov had been deemed a flight risk.

== Courtroom sketches ==
- Courtroom sketch of Alexander Smirnov, Richard Schonfeld and David Chesnoff (his attorneys) by Wes Rand; Las Vegas Review-Journal; Tribune News Service via Getty Images from
- Courtroom sketch of Alexander Smirnov by William T. Robles, Associated Press from
