= Abbe Lowell =

American attorney (born 1952)

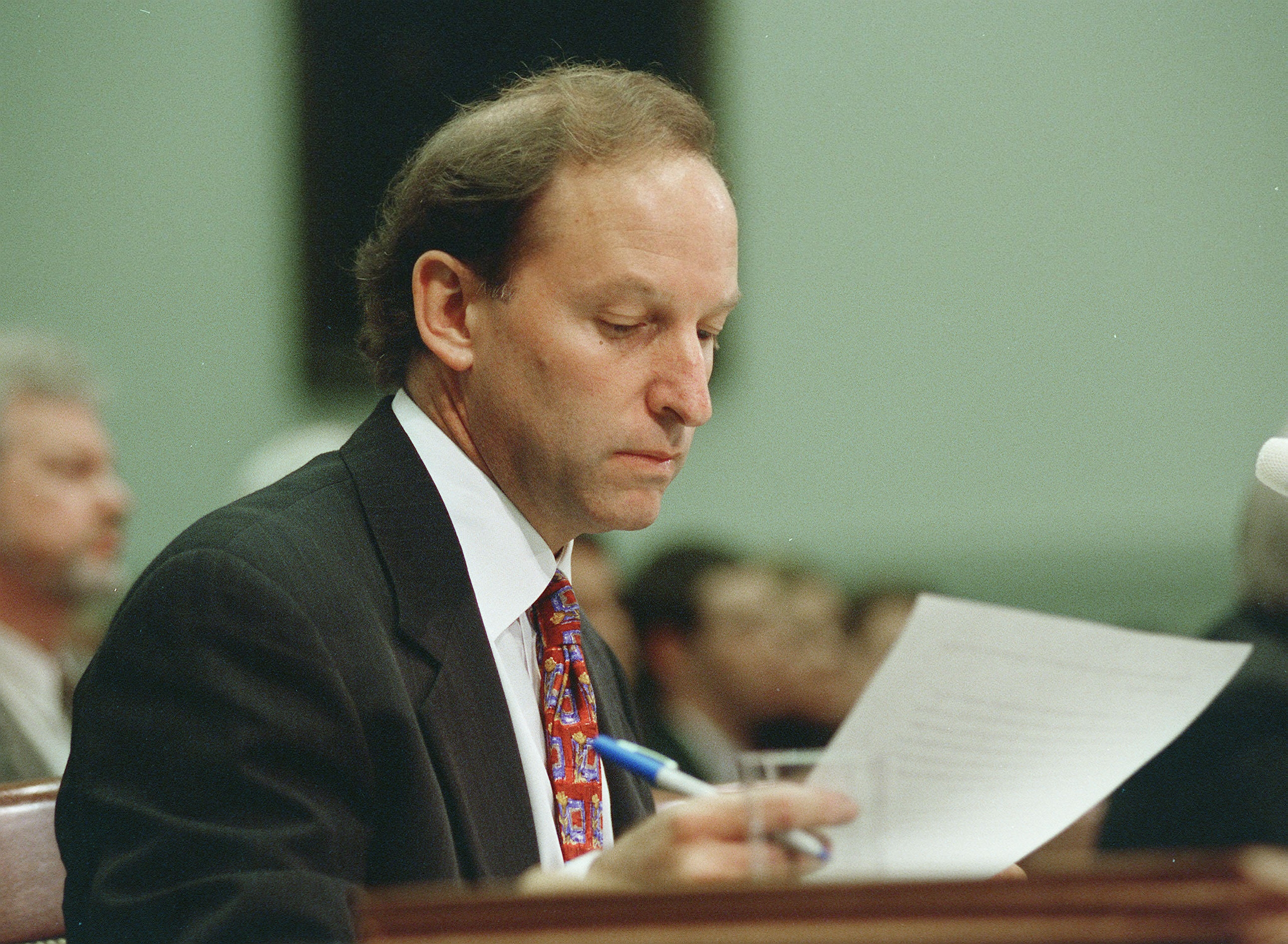
- Lowell during the impeachment inquiry into Bill Clinton, 1998

Personal details
- Born: Abbe David Lowell; April 28, 1952 (age 74) New York City, U.S.
- Party: Democratic
- Spouse: Molly Meegan
- Children: 3
- Education: Columbia University (BA, JD)

Abbe David Lowell (born April 28, 1952) is an American defense attorney, who has represented several high-profile defendants. Some of the well known political figures Lowell has represented are Charles Keating, Joseph M. McDade, Joseph Bruno, Gary Condit, Jim Gibbons, Lisa Cook, Hunter Biden, Letitia James and Don Lemon.

== Early life and education ==
Lowell was born in 1952. He graduated from Columbia University in 1974 and Columbia Law School in 1977. Lowell is Jewish.

== Career ==
Lowell worked in the U.S. Department of Justice, including a stint as an assistant to Attorney General Benjamin Civiletti. He has been an adjunct professor of law at Georgetown University Law Center and Columbia University. He was a partner at the firm of Winston & Strawn LLP. He has appeared in the media as a legal affairs expert.

Lowell was chief minority counsel to U.S. House of Representatives Democratic members during the impeachment of Bill Clinton in the Lewinsky scandal.

Lowell has defended political figures including John Edwards, Jim Wright, Dan Rostenkowski, Charles Keating, Gary Condit, former Nevada governor Jim Gibbons, former congressman Joseph McDade, lobbyist Jack Abramoff, and U.S. senator Bob Menendez.

Lowell was part of the defense of Stephen Jin-Woo Kim, a State Department contractor who pleaded guilty to a felony count of disclosing classified American intelligence on North Korea.

As of June 2017, Lowell has represented both Jared Kushner and Ivanka Trump in inquiries linked to Russia.

Lowell represented Nickie Lum Davis, who pleaded guilty in August 2020 to illegally lobbying the Trump administration on behalf of international fugitive Jho Low. In 2017, Lowell was also involved in discussions about Low's legal and lobbying efforts, which were designed to end the Justice Department's probe of the embezzlement of around $4.5 billion from the Malaysian state fund 1MDB.

In 2021, Lowell represented Michael Taylor, the American soldier accused of helping Carlos Ghosn escape from Japan. At the time, Taylor was fighting extradition to Japan.

As of May, 2025, Lowell left Winston & Strawn and started a new law firm Lowell & Associates.

In August 2025, it was reported that Lowell was hired by Federal Reserve Board Governor Lisa Cook to defend her against being fired by President Donald Trump for alleged mortgage fraud. Cook argued that her firing is illegal. Lowell represented Letitia James against accusations of mortgage fraud.

=== Justice Department investigation ===
As of December 2020, the United States Department of Justice's Public Integrity Section was investigating Lowell for his role in an alleged "secret lobbying scheme" and potential bribery in exchange for a pardon. Lowell was allegedly enlisted by California billionaire Sanford Diller to seek a pardon for his friend Hugh Baras.

Lowell's alleged involvement came to light in an August 28, 2020 court opinion by Judge Beryl Howell that found Lowell's communications were not covered by standard attorney-client privileges "because they potentially contained both evidence of crimes and involved nonlawyer third parties." As part of the alleged bribery-for-pardon scheme, Lowell allegedly interacted with the White House Counsel's Office, and "according to documents reviewed by the [Wall Street] Journal, Mr. Lowell and Mr. Diller discussed contacting top officials in the [Trump] administration." The scheme would allegedly have involved a donation of more than $300,000 to Republican Party causes. However, no pardon for Baras was issued, and the investigation did not result in criminal charges.

== Political and civic activities ==
In 1982, Lowell ran unsuccessfully for the Maryland House of Delegates as a Democrat. Lowell heads the development committee and is a trustee of the Shakespeare Theatre. He also served as vice president and general counsel of the Jewish Community Center of Greater Washington in 2020.
