= Burisma =

Ukrainian energy company

Burisma Holdings Limited
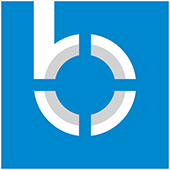
- Type: Private
- Industry: Oil and gas
- Founded: 2002
- Founder: Mykola Zlochevsky
- Defunct: February 16, 2023
- Headquarters: Limassol, Cyprus
- Key people: Mykola Zlochevsky (President); Taras Burdeinyi (CEO); Alan Apter (Chairman)
- Products: Natural gas
- Services: Drilling
- Owner: Brociti Investments Limited
- Subsidiaries: Burisma Services; Aldea; Esko-Pivnich; Persha Ukrainska Naftogazova Kompaniya; GasOilInvest; KUB-Gas; Naftogaz Garant; Naftogazopromyslova geologiya Pari; Nadragas; Nadragasvydobuvannya; SystemOilEngineering; Tehnokomservis

Burisma Holdings Limited was a holding company based in Kyiv, Ukraine, for a group of energy exploration and production companies. It was founded in 2002 and registered in Limassol, Cyprus, until being dissolved in 2023. It was one of the largest private natural gas producers in Ukraine circa 2019. It was owned by Ukrainian oligarch Mykola Zlochevsky through his company Brociti Investments Limited.

Burisma's subsidiaries included Esko-Pivnich, Pari, Persha Ukrainska Naftogazova Kompaniya, Naftogaz Garant, KUB-Gas and Astroinvest-Ukraine.

== History ==
Burisma was founded in 2002. Consolidation of the Burisma Group took place mainly in 2006 and 2007. It became a major shareholder of Sunrise Energy Resources, a Delaware Corporation, which in 2004 acquired Ukrainian companies Esko-Pivnich (Ukrainian: Еско-Північ) and Pari (Ukrainian: Парі), which owned natural gas exploration licences. In 2009, shares in these companies were transferred to Millington Solutions Limited. However, shortly thereafter Millington ceased to exist, at which point Burisma claimed ownership of those two companies.

In 2012, Persha Ukrainska Naftogazova Kompaniya (First Ukrainian Oil and Gas Company, Ukrainian: Перша Українська нафтогазова компанія), Naftogaz Garant (Oil and Gas Guarantee, Ukrainian: Нафтогаз гарант), and KrymTopEnergoServis (CrimeaTopEnergoService, Ukrainian: Кримтопенергосервіс) became a part of the Burisma Group.

In 2014, Burisma signed a cooperation agreement with KazMunayGas, the national oil and gas company of Kazakhstan. In 2016, Burisma bought two hydraulic fracturing (fracking) fleets. In 2017, it bought a 3,000-horsepower Service King Manufacturing SK 3000 drilling rig for $40 million (USD); it was the most powerful drilling rig in Eastern Europe at the time.

In February 2016, Burisma acquired a 70% stake in KUB-Gas (КУБ-Газ). In 2017, it bought a majority stake in Diloretio Holdings Limited, a company which owned Ukrainian gas companies SystemOilEngineering (Ukrainian: Системойлинжиниринг), Naftogazopromyslova geologiya, (Oil and Gas Industrial Geology, Ukrainian: Нафтогазпромислова геологія), and Tehnokomservis (TechnoComService, Ukrainian: Технокомсервіс). Also in 2017, Burisma bought Nadragasvydobuvannya (Subsoil Gas Extraction, Ukrainian: Надрагазвидобування) and GasOilInvest (Гасоілінвест).

=== International expansion ===
Burisma was one of the founders of the International Forum on Energy Security for the Future and partnered with Electric Marathon, as part of efforts to expand into emerging markets. In April 2019, Burisma acquired Astroinvest Ukraine (Астроінвест-Україна), a formerly British natural gas trading company.

In 2017, Burisma signed a partnership agreement with the Atlantic Council to promote anti-corruption measures.

=== Visibility in American politics ===
During the 2020 United States presidential election, the re-election campaign of President Donald Trump promoted allegations of corruption focused on the relationship between Burisma and Hunter Biden. The claims were first covered by Breitbart News, and subsequently formed the basis of a campaign by Trump and his political associates to urge the Ukrainian government to initiate an investigation of the younger Biden's role with Burisma, culminating in Trump's impeachment and acquittal. Republicans hoped to use the Burisma allegations to tarnish Joe Biden's 2020 Presidential campaign, but an investigation by the Republican-controlled Senate Homeland Security and Finance Committees shortly before the 2020 presidential election concluded that there was no evidence of improper influence or wrongdoing by Joe Biden.

== Operations ==
Burisma's primary operations were in Ukraine, supplemented by activities in Germany, Mexico, Italy, and Kazakhstan. It held 35 gas production licences in Ukraine in the Dnieper-Donets, Carpathian, and Azov-Kuban Basins. Exploration and production activities were carried out at eight sites in five regions. Burisma also provided natural gas well services, including hydraulic fracturing. In 2019, Burisma planned to build a liquefied petroleum gas (LPG) plant in Kharkiv with a capacity of 50,000 tonnes per year.

In 2016, Burisma was the second largest privately owned natural gas producer in Ukraine after DTEK, accounting for 26% of all natural gas produced by privately owned companies and more than 5% of total gas production in Ukraine. According to the company, it produced 1.3 billion cubic metres (4.6×10^{10} cubic feet) of natural gas in Ukraine in 2018.

In Kazakhstan, the company provided drilling services to KazMunayGas and its subsidiaries, including at the Urikhtau gas field. In Italy, Burisma developed three geothermal power projects in partnership with Gesto Investimento e Gestão.

Burisma's subsidiary Esko-Pivnich operates in the Kharkiv Oblast, and Pari operates in Western Ukraine (Lviv, Ivano-Frankivsk and Chernivtsi oblasts). KUB-Gas operates in Luhansk Oblast, GasOilInvest in Poltava Oblast, and Nadragasvydobuvannya in Dnipropetrovsk Oblast. Burisma also owned KrymTopEnergoServis, a company which leased three gas deposits in Crimea. However, after annexation of Crimea by the Russian Federation, KrymTopEnergoServis ceased operation as Burisma subsidiary.

== Corporate matters ==
=== Ownership ===
Burisma Holdings was owned by Brociti Investments Limited, a Cyprus-based company owned by Ukrainian former politician and businessman Mykola Zlochevsky. Zlochevsky was minister of natural resources under Viktor Yanukovych, then president of Ukraine. Brociti Investments acquired Burisma Holdings in 2011. Before that acquisition, Mykola Zlochevsky and Mykola Lisin each owned a 50% interest in Burisma Holdings. Lisin, a Ukrainian politician, died in a traffic accident in 2011.

In 2012, a study of Burisma done by the Anti-Corruption Action Center revealed that the true owner of Burisma was billionaire-oligarch Ihor Kolomoisky. Kolomoisky held a controlling interest in Burisma.

=== Management ===
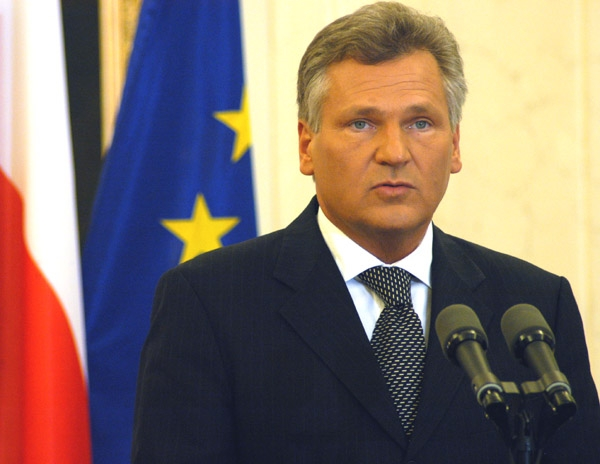
Aleksander Kwaśniewski, former President of the Republic of Poland, was appointed to the board in January 2014.

Taras Burdeinyi was the chief executive officer of Burisma Holdings, and Alan Apter was chairman of the board of directors. As of 14 October 2019, the members of the board of directors, in order of seniority, are Alan Apter, Aleksander Kwaśniewski, Joseph Cofer Black, Karina Zlochevska, Christina Sofocleous, Riginos Charalampous, and Marina Pericleous. Aleksander Kwaśniewski, former president of Poland, joined the board in January 2014. In 2017, Joseph Cofer Black, former director of the Counterterrorism Center of the Central Intelligence Agency (1999–2002) in the George W. Bush administration and former Ambassador-at-Large for counter-terrorism (2002–2004), was appointed to the board. Karina Zlochevska, daughter of Mykola Zlochevskiy, was also appointed in February 2016.

In April 2014, Devon Archer, a former senior adviser to the John Kerry 2004 presidential campaign, and Hunter Biden, an attorney and the son of then-US vice president Joe Biden, joined the board. Archer left the company in 2018 and Hunter Biden left in April 2019, when his term as a director expired.

=== Financial results ===
Burisma Holdings does not disclose its financial results. It has been calculated, based on a minimal natural gas price, that the company's revenue in 2018 may have totaled at least US$400 million.

== Investigations ==
In April 2014, the Serious Fraud Office of the United Kingdom launched a money laundering investigation of Zlochevsky's business activities; as a result, accounts of Burisma Holdings and its parent Brociti Investments at the London branch of BNP Paribas—with US$23 million on deposit—were frozen. That money was transferred as a result of complex transactions by a company controlled by a Ukrainian businessman, Serhiy Kurchenko, who was subject to the European Union restrictive measures, i.e. sanctions. When the Ukrainian prosecutor general's office failed to provide documents needed for the investigation, a British court in January 2015 dropped the case and ordered that the assets be unfrozen. In September 2015, then-U.S. Ambassador to Ukraine Geoffrey Pyatt gave a speech in which he called out Ukrainian prosecutors for failing to cooperate with the investigation.

The Ukrainian prosecutor general's office and the National Anti-Corruption Bureau of Ukraine (NABU) have conducted a total of 15 investigations of Burisma's owner Zlochevsky. In 2016, former Prosecutor General Yuriy Lutsenko accused Burisma subsidiaries of conspiracy and tax evasion of about one billion hryvnias (US$70 million) in 2014–2015, but later, during the investigation(s), subsidiaries of Burisma were not mentioned. A tax audit of Esko-Pivnich by the State Fiscal Service found violations in 2016. As a result, 50 million hryvnias (US$1.9 million) of additional taxes was paid to avoid charges. In total, Burisma paid an additional 180 million hryvnias (US$7.44 million) of taxes to avoid further criminal proceedings. A criminal investigation was conducted to determine whether natural resources extraction licenses were legally issued to Burisma subsidiaries during the period Zlochevsky held government office. Although Burisma violations of the procedure were established by NABU, the Specialized Anti-Corruption Prosecutor's Office missed procedural deadlines for a lawsuit and the case for nullifying licenses was dismissed by the court. In October 2019, Prosecutor General Ruslan Riaboshapka announced that all 15 investigation cases will be reviewed.

In January 2024, John Buretta (an American lawyer and former U.S. Deputy Assistant Attorney General, who was one of the key attorneys on Zlochevsky's defense team) retroactively filed a Foreign Agents Registration Act document for work done on behalf of Burisma and Zlochevsky in 2016. According to Buretta's law firm, the decision to file the disclosure 8 years after the fact came "after a discussion with the DOJ."

== See also ==
- Cyberwarfare by Russia
- Biden–Ukraine conspiracy theory
- Trump–Ukraine scandal
