= Harvest Fund Management =

Chinese Asset Management Company

Harvest Fund Management (HFM)
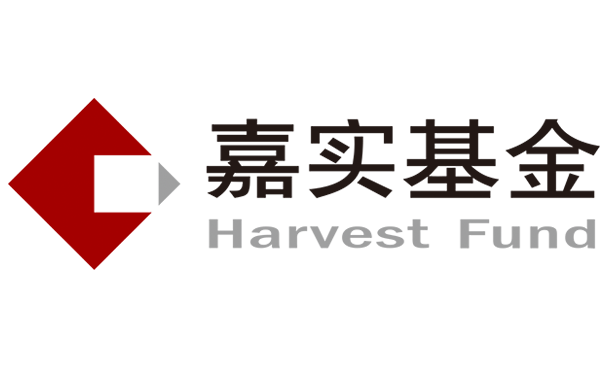
- Native name: 嘉实基金
- Industry: Financial services
- Founded: 1999
- Headquarters: Beijing, China
- Key people: Zhao Xuejun 赵学军 (Chairman); Thomas Kwan (CEO)
- AUM: US$230 billion (31 December 2020)
- Owners: DWS Group (30%); China Credit Trust (40%); Lixin Investment (30%)
- Website: www.jsfund.cn

Harvest Fund Management (HFM; Chinese: 嘉实基金; pinyin: Jiāshí jījīn) is a Chinese asset management company that invests in financial services.

== History ==
Harvest was founded in March 1999 upon approval by the China Securities Regulatory Commission (CSRC). Currently, Harvest shareholders include China Credit Trust Co., Ltd., Lixin Investment Co., Ltd. and Deutsche Bank AG.

== Harvest Fund Management (HFM) ==
Harvest Fund Management Co. Ltd. is a privately owned investment manager. The firm provides asset management and retirement management services to pension and profit sharing plans, insurance companies, and enterprises. HFM invests in the public equity and fixed income markets of China. Harvest Fund Management was founded in March 1999 and is based in Beijing, China.

== Harvest Global Investments (UK) Ltd ==
Harvest Global Investments (UK) Ltd ("HGIUK") was established in London as a wholly owned subsidiary of Harvest Global Investments with the intention of continuing the expansion of Harvest globally, becoming the first Chinese-parent fund company to choose London as a base outside of China and Hong Kong.

== Harvest USA ==
In 2012, HFM became the first China-based asset manager to create a joint venture with a US partner, forming Harvest USA. Harvest USA is the exclusive distributor of Harvest mutual funds in North America. Harvest USA's first product in the United States is the Harvest Funds Intermediate Bond that was launched on 02/27/2013.

== U.S. Listed ETFs with Deutsche Bank ==
Deutsche Asset & Wealth Management launched the db X-trackers Harvest CSI 300 China A-Shares Fund (NYSE ticker: ASHR), on Wednesday 6 November 2013. The exchange-traded fund (ETF) offers a direct investment opportunity in China's mainland market (A Shares). The fund is able to access the mainland markets via the RQFII system. Deutsche Asset & Wealth Management utilizes Harvest Fund Management's Qualified Foreign Institutional Investor quota to provide foreign access.

== BHR Partners ==
BHR Partners is a private investment firm founded in 2013 with Harvest and Bohai Industrial Investment Fund Management Co. each holding 30% shares, and two U.S. firms, Rosemont Seneca (formerly owned by Hunter Biden and Devon Archer) and Boston-based Thornton Group as a pair, owning a 30% stake. Yuan investments in the fund were converted to U.S. dollars through Shanghai Free-Trade Zone, facilitating yuan offshore investment. In 2014, BHR made an approximately RMB4 billion investment in "the segregation and capitalization of Sinopec Group's non-oil business into Sinopec Marketing Corporation". In 2015, it invested in Henniges Automotive with strategic partner, AVIC Auto. Other investments included China General Nuclear, 3Bio Inc., and Didi Taxi.

In November, 2016, BHR bought a minority interest in African copper mine Tenke Fungurume Mining S.A. for $1.14 billion in cash. China Molybdenum Co. is purchasing the majority interest from Freeport-McMoran and the Democratic Republic of the Congo, where the mine is located, owns the remaining 20% of the mine.
