= International Rights Advocates v. Apple, Microsoft, Dell, Tesla =

2019 lawsuit

Doe v. Apple
- Court: United States District Court for the District of Columbia
- Full case name: Doe et al. v. Apple Inc., Alphabet Inc., Microsoft Inc., Dell Technologies Inc., Tesla Inc.
- Started: December 15, 2019; 6 years ago
- Docket nos.: 1:19-cv-03737 (D.D.C.); 21-7135 (D.C. Cir.)

Case history
- Appealed to: Court of Appeals for the District of Columbia Circuit
- Subsequent action: Dismissal affirmed on appeal in March 2024
- Argument: December 8, 2022 (Appeal)

Outcome
- Dismissed in November 2021; 4 years ago

Court membership
- Judges sitting: District: Carl J. Nichols Appeals: Sri Srinivasan; Cornelia Pillard; Neomi Rao

Keywords
- Victims of Trafficking and Violence Protection Act of 2000

International Rights Advocates, Inc. filed an injunctive relief and damages class-action lawsuit against Apple, Microsoft, Dell, and Tesla in December 2019. The plaintiff was representing fourteen Congolese parents and children seeking relief and damage fees for these companies aiding and abetting the use of young children in the Democratic Republic of Congo (DRC) cobalt mining industry. The plaintiff also pursued relief on the common law basis of negligent supervision, enrichment, and intentional infliction of emotional distress. In November 2021, a federal judge dismissed the suit, ruling, among other things, that there was no causal relationship between the companies and the individuals' injuries. In March 2024, the Court of Appeals for the District of Columbia Circuit ruled that the plaintiffs had standing for the damages claims, but affirmed the dismissal because of failure to state a claim.

== Background ==
Before the area became established as the Democratic Republic of the Congo, it had a significant population which was seen as fertile ground utilized by slave traders. After the 19th century, industrialization began to boom, bringing in many who wanted to extract the natural resources in the area. In the late 1800s, King Leopold II of Belgium claimed the area as personal property and levied forced labor through quotas. Under King Leopold, the Congo faced a reign of terror which can be seen through many Congo memoirs left by civilians during his rule. From ivory to the rubber craze in the 1900s, any noncompliant civilian was punished. After its independence in 1960, The Democratic Republic of Congo was presented with leaders such as Mobutu Sese Seko (1949–1965), Laurent-Deisre Kabila (1997–2001), and Joseph Kabila (2001–2019) who all left the DRC in extremely impoverished conditions over time.

=== Large-scale mining (LSM) ===
The cobalt mining done in the Democratic Republic of the Congo is divided up into artisanal mining and large-scale mining. Large-scale mines (abbreviated LSM) and these make up the majority of mining operations done in the DRC. These mines are owned by large, multinational corporations that have access to the machinery and tools required to effectively mine cobalt and other minerals. Due to this, LSM has a higher safety standard than that of artisanal mining, but because of cost cuts on construction, still present worse conditions than most other mines. Large-scale mining operations primarily hire miners through subcontracting firms in order to cut costs.The subcontracted workforce is paid less and receives no benefits through the company. This paired with the dangerous conditions of the mines have led to many mining related health issues and deaths among the LSM workforce.

=== Artisanal or small-scale mining (ASM) ===
Artisanal and small-scale mining (abbreviated to ASM) makes up the rest of the mining operations in the DRC. It is estimated that artisanal mining comprises fifteen to thirty percent of the DRC's cobalt mining operations. ASM is performed with basic tools that makes mining dangerous and labor-intensive. Oftentimes miners will use their hands to manually remove the cobalt if they do not have access to any tools. Most miners in these conditions also lack safety gear that can lead to health issues caused by exposure to the conditions inside the mines. This mining is often done by small groups digging their own tunnels, scavenging through excess dirt from LSM, and even by mining in abandoned tunnels. These "mines" have no regulations or safety standards, and paired with not having the sophisticated equipment to safely mine cobalt, create extremely dangerous work conditions. Many Congolese miners are in extreme poverty and barely earn enough to scrape by from mining.

=== Child labor ===
This extreme poverty seen in ASM is the cause of the child labor seen in the DRC mining operations. Oftentimes both parents work in the mines, or the household is child-led and it is the only viable source of income. While child labor is illegal in the DRC, corruption has led to it being overlooked in favor of cheap labor. According to the Human Trafficking Search, "children under 14 years of age are reported to earn an average of $0.81", which is $1.23 less than the average for an adult male working the exact same job. Siddharth Kara, writer of the book Cobalt Red recounts one instance of these conditions the children face in an interview, "At one industrial mine, children, barefoot or in flip flops, had to make their way up this 30-, 40-meter wall roughly at a 45-degree angle. It was just stone and gravel shifting beneath their feet. They would fill sacks that were 20, 30, 40 kilograms, depending on how big and strong they were, and then come back down carrying them."

=== Common dangers ===
Mining cobalt produces dust and other pollutants that pollute the air, water, and food in and around the mining operation. This combined with the close proximity of communities to the mines and the lack of safety equipment leads to health and reproductive issues that can last long term and be fatal. The mines themselves are also often unsafe, and collapses are a normal occurrence in many of the mines. These collapses have led to many instances of injury and death. One of the anonymous plaintiffs in the lawsuit died at the age of 17 in one such collapse. Many of the miners are impoverished and overworked, which causes many job site accidents to occur. Another anonymous plaintiff in the lawsuit fell around two stories into a tunnel while carrying bags of rocks up a mountain; paralyzing him. While conventions put into place by the International Labor Organization (ILO) require compensation, rest requirements, and health care, these regulations are often not enforced.

== Case background ==
The IRA had a July 2021 hearing in which all the companies were filing a motion to dismiss the case. Microsoft's lawyer explicitly stated and pronounced that they do not have a relationship with the suppliers to be directly responsible for what happens in the cobalt mines in the DRC. Essentially, the defense for all the tech companies is that they "buy cobalt" and do not have direct control of what happens in the mines, despite having policies that discuss an opposition to child labor. The IRA stressed strong opinions about the tech companies child labor policies saying that they are essentially lying and covering their bases by saying they have a policy in place.

The cases of the plaintiffs all involve cobalt mining incidents that caused great harm or even death as a minor. The plaintiffs are mostly between 14 and 17 years of age and have all chosen to remain anonymous for protection from the DRC's government. They are listed as Jane Doe 1, John Doe 1, John Doe 2, Jenna Doe 3, James Doe 4, John Doe 5, Jenna Doe 6, Jane Doe 2, Jenna Doe 7, Jenna Doe 8, John Doe 9, Jenna Doe 10, Jenna Doe 11, Jane Doe 3, John Doe 12, and John Doe 13. Of these cases, 13 of the deaths and injuries involve collapses. One of the worst collapses listed is of a chamber ceiling collapsing and killing 35 miners, most of which were 17 years of age or younger. The anonymous plaintiff, who was 17 years old at the time, was one of the only survivors, but came away with two shattered legs. Another of the anonymous plaintiffs became paralyzed at 14 after falling into a tunnel while working as a mule at a mine under Glencore. Glencore sells its cobalt to a processor who then supplies the Tech Companies listed in the lawsuit. One anonymous plaintiff was recruited by the DRC Presidential Guard along with other minors to mine cobalt and give it to the Guard for $1.20 a day. After the plaintiff proposed cutting out the Presidential Guard and selling directly to the buyers, he was shot in the back and has been weakened from the wound. A motorcycle accident left another of the plaintiffs without his left leg. He was hit by a large truck while transporting cobalt for a labor broker connected to Huayou Cobalt, who supplies cobalt to the Tech Companies. The cases provided show a connection to the Tech Companies by their involvement with mines owned by mining companies that sell to cobalt refiners, who then sell to all or most of the Defendant Tech Companies.

So in this particular case, several counts were mentioned under the Claims for Relief in the case of Doe et al. v. Apple Inc. et al. Count 1 was the "Forced Labor By All Plaintiffs Against All Defendants TVPRA, 18 U.S.C. 1589 &1595". Count 2 that was listed is "Unjust Enrichment By All Plaintiffs Against All Defendants". Count 3 which was listed is "Negligent Supervision By All Plaintiffs Against All Defendants". Finally, Count 4 that was listed is "Intentional Infliction of Emotional Distress All Plaintiffs Against All Defendants". These four counts were listed in the case and each of them had rationales under each of the counts that describes and provide instances where it is believed the companies were participating in the unjust treatment of the plaintiffs.

In Count 1, starts by stating that the plaintiffs are incorporated in the complaint set forth and that the defendants Apple, Alphabet, Dell, Microsoft, and Tesla as stated before knowingly knew about the work conditions, wages, and hazards that the cobalt mining brought. It is also mentioned under this count that the plaintiffs suffered injuries and which put a strain on the families who were working the cobalt mines. Overall, Count 1 describes each tech company as "knowing" they were involved as well as contributing to the treatment of the children.

In Count 2, this describes that the defendants were "unjustly benefited by receiving DRC cobalt at prices reflecting that a significant portion of Defendants' cobalt supply chain is mined by children performing extremely hazardous work…". This count also stated that the Defendants were knowingly benefitting and being enriched from the unlawful use of forced child labor. As described in this count, there was an accusation or alleged conduct that the tech companies' venture with the cobalt supply chain was using deception and misrepresentation when it came to hiding the facts that there was an abuse present with the plaintiffs. Lastly, it is described in this count that plaintiffs want full restitution of what the tech companies Apple, Alphabet, Dell, Microsoft, and Tesla has gained as a result of the wrongful conduct that had been committed.

In Count 3, it was outlined here that the ones who were in control of the cobalt supply chain Glencore/Umicore and Huayou Cobalt are the ones who supplied the cobalt and acted as the "agents" to the defendants. In this count it was made known that the defendants had the authority to essentially overlook and make sure to regulate the cobalt supply chain that they were overseeing. Also, it was outlined in this count that the tech companies were claiming to the public that they had policies and practices to stop the use of forced child labor. Lastly in this count, it was mentioned that the defendants had failed to overlook or control their employees and agents as well as make the necessary investigations into the negative effects on the plaintiffs.

Finally in Count 4, it mentions that the tech companies were intentionally and continuously being a part of the supply chain ventures which "…went beyond all bounds of decency". In this count, it was also mentioned that the tech companies were enabling the system which as a result caused the plaintiffs "severe emotional distress". As a result of the defendant's actions, it was mentioned that the plaintiff suffered emotional and physical damage and the amount that is to be determined will be "…ascertained at trial".

== DRC resources ==
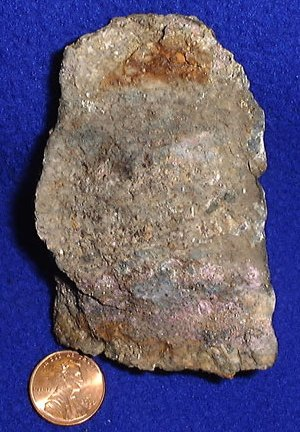
Cobalt ore

The DRC is rich in natural resources such as copper, tin, tungsten, tantalum, gold, and most importantly, cobalt. About seventy-five percent (75%) of the cobalt supply globally comes from the Katanga "copperbelt." This belt is a part of a world-class cobalt and copper deposit that stretches from northeastern Zambia all the way to the southeastern Democratic Republic of Congo. Cobalt is a crucial component in rechargeable lithium-ion batteries, which are immensely valuable to companies like Tesla and Apple, which are acclaimed in technology and electronics. In 2016, Amnesty International reported that large-scale mining and processing companies purportedly obtain around 75% of the cobalt mined in the Congo's mineral-rich Katanga and Lualaba provinces. However, these enterprises usually buy their minerals from artisanal mines, adding complexity to the supply chain. This report indicates that child labor is part of the global supply chain because children mine and sell to adult miners, who then sell to licensed buying houses, who sell to large companies. According to the case filed by the International Rights Advocates Group, all companies accused in the lawsuit were knowingly profiting and providing provisions to the mining system in DRC.

== Venue and jurisdiction ==
The Plaintiffs are bringing their case to the United States Judicial District because DRC contains no law allowing them to seek reparation against cobalt consumers functioning outside of the DRC. The parties on the side of the Plaintiff would be compromising their safety due to the governmental conditions present in the Democratic Republic of Congo, due to the human rights forum provided under the 2013 Trafficking Victims Protection Reauthorization Act. Due to the damages claimed against the Plaintiff in the United States, they cannot contest their claims in the DRC.

== Alleged violations ==
The 2016 Amnesty International report shows that children work in Congo mines and are especially vulnerable to harsh working circumstances, such as carrying 20-40 kilogram sacks of cobalt for 10–12 hours per day on awful roads. This report also states that children are exposed to sexual harassment and abuse. In 2018, a sixteen-year-old boy was involved in an accident caused by a tunnel collapse, which left his left leg paralyzed. Another tunnel accident occurred in 2017 where 17 dead bodies were found, and others were unable to be retrieved. The plaintiff claimed that Tesla, Apple, Microsoft, Dell, and Google's inability to provide resources and regulations for safe mining activities makes them equally responsible for these human rights violations. A major allegation was that these corporations were aware of the conditions of workers at the mines the cobalt they use came.

== Defendants' responses ==
After the lawsuit was filed against these companies, the respondents moved forward by stating their company's ethics and code of conduct. Apple declined to respond or comment on the lawsuit allegations. Apple also told CNN Business that the company "remains deeply committed to the responsible sourcing of materials into our products." Apple also shared its full list of cobalt refiners and stated that they do not purchase the cobalt from supply chains that do not meet its standards. They also mentioned the refiners they removed from their chains in 2019. Dell stated that they are "committed to the responsible sourcing of minerals" and upholding the human rights of workers. Dell also claimed that they have "never knowingly sourced operations using any form of involuntary labor, fraudulent recruiting practices or child labor." Along with this statement, they claim to have eliminated supply chains if any transgression has been seen. Google has responded by saying that they have been working with industry and supply groups to eliminate the problem. Microsoft and Tesla did not comment on the allegations presented by the International Rights Advocates Group. The defendants also claim to have "voluntary programs" to put a stop to the utilization of forced and child labor in their supply chains.

== Updates ==
The U.S. Court of Appeals for the District of Columbia Circuit dismissed the child labor case on Tuesday, March 5, 2024, against the tech companies Apple, Tesla, Google, Microsoft, and Dell and refused to hold them accountable for child labor being used in cobalt mining in the Democratic Republic of Congo (DRC). The International Rights Advocates (IRA) stated that "This ruling is a setback for our efforts to combat child labor within the tech industry's supply chains." The IRA however, has stated to remain committed to making sure there is justice for families who are impacted by this type of practice.

In the lawsuit that took place, Congolese children were the ones to work in the cobalt mines. They were working essentially to be away from poverty and starvation. The children were also under threats to be "…barred from working elsewhere if they ever thought of quitting". The biggest case and argument was that the tech companies "knew" about the conditions the children were being subjected to and continued to buy cobalt from them despite the evidence that was presented. Because of this, it was also argued that it was being pushed further by the tech companies.

The U.S. Court of Appeals for the District of Columbia Circuit supported the lower court's decision in the matter. They explained that to prove that these tech companies participated in the venture, there had to be proof that there was an engagement in forced labor in the metals supply chain. In addition, because the tech companies did purchase the cobalt from a specific supply chain that originated in the DRC, it does not constitute participation. The courts also added that the companies "could not be charged under common law" for the fact that the co-venturers are not really connected to the suppliers.

== Lawsuits in the Congo ==
Chinese mining group CMOC has agreed to settle with the Congo state-controlled mining company Gécamines for $800M between 2023 and 2028. The disagreement began when CMOC's Tenke Fungurume mine was ordered to halt exports when the Congolese mining company Gécamines realized CMOC had been lying about its mineral reserves and owed $7.6 billion in royalties and interest to the Congo. CMOC will pay a minimum of $1.2 billion in dividends to settle the dispute over royalties at the Tenke Fungurume Mining (TFM) operation.

According to Mining Technology, "CMOC said in a stock exchange filing: 'Gécamines will be entitled to 20% of the total value of the project's subcontracting and the right to acquire a volume of production proportional to its 20% stake in TFM on market terms and in compliance with Congolese laws."

Barron's was quoted as saying, "In the future, Gecamines will be entitled to 20% of the total value of the project's subcontracting and the right to acquire a volume of production proportional to its 20% stake in TFM on market terms and in compliance with Congolese laws," CMOC said."

Barron's also said that "Tenke Fungurume, the world's second-largest cobalt mine, produced about 20,000 tonnes of copper and 1,500 tonnes of cobalt a month through 2022, according to company figures."

Siddharth Kara, author of Cobalt Red: How the Blood of the Congo Powers our Lives, said in his book that China owns 15 of the 19 copper-cobalt mining concessions in the DRC. Chinese dominance in the DRC has caused many corporations like Apple, Tesla, and Microsoft to depend on them to mine cobalt. While China does not have a monopoly on cobalt, the largest company that mines cobalt is Glencore, a Swedish-based company. China is increasing its economic dependency on global companies that produce lithium batteries as they continue dominating mining in the Democratic Republic of the Congo.
