= BHR Partners =

Private investment fund based in China

BHR Partners (Shanghai) Equity Investment Fund Management Co., Ltd.
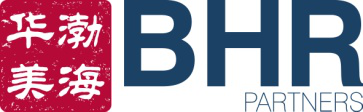
- Native name: 晟荣星远（上海）私募基金管理有限责任公司
- Type: Joint venture
- Industry: Financial services Investment Management
- Founded: 2013; 13 years ago
- Founders: Hunter Biden; Devon Archer; Jonathan Li
- Headquarters: Beijing, China
- Key people: Jonathan Li (CEO)
- AUM: CN¥12 billion (April 2017)
- Owners: Bohai Industrial Investment Fund; Harvest Fund Management; Rosemont Seneca Bohai; Thornton Group LLC
- Website: bhrpe.com

BHR Partners (Shanghai) Equity Investment Fund Management Co., Ltd. (commonly referred to as BHR Partners) is a Chinese private equity firm. The company was renamed to BHR Partners (Shanghai) Equity Investment Fund Management Co., Ltd. on May 31, 2023. BHR Partners was founded in 2013 by Bohai Industrial Investment Fund Management Co., Ltd., which is controlled by Bank of China Limited whose focus is on mergers and acquisitions, investments, and reforms as part of the country's state-owned enterprises.

== Business Overview ==
BHR was established specifically for the purpose of capital injection into Sinopec Marketing Co., in accordance with the laws of the PRC. Its registered address is China (Shanghai) Pilot Free Trade Zone and principal place of business at Unit 3101, 31/F, Tower 2, China Central Place, 79 Jianguo Road, Chaoyang District, Beijing."

BHR was one of twenty-five investors to take part in the capital injection of Sinopec Marketing Co. and their investment of approximately US$1.7 billion dollars was the 7th largest of the group, giving them a 1.68% shareholding interest out of an available 29.99%. As part of the approved agreement, Sinopec retained 70.01%.

BHR was founded on November 1, 2013, by two Chinese-registered asset managers, Bohai Industrial Investment Fund and Harvest Fund Management, and two U.S. organisations, Thornton Group LLC and Rosemont Seneca Partners (thus the name BHR for the first initials of three of the four asset management founding firms). The Chinese registered asset managers are BOC International Holdings-backed Bohai Industrial Investment Fund Management and Deutsche Bank-backed Harvest Fund Management. The U.S. partners as a pair and the two Chinese partners each own a 30% stake in the joint management firm.

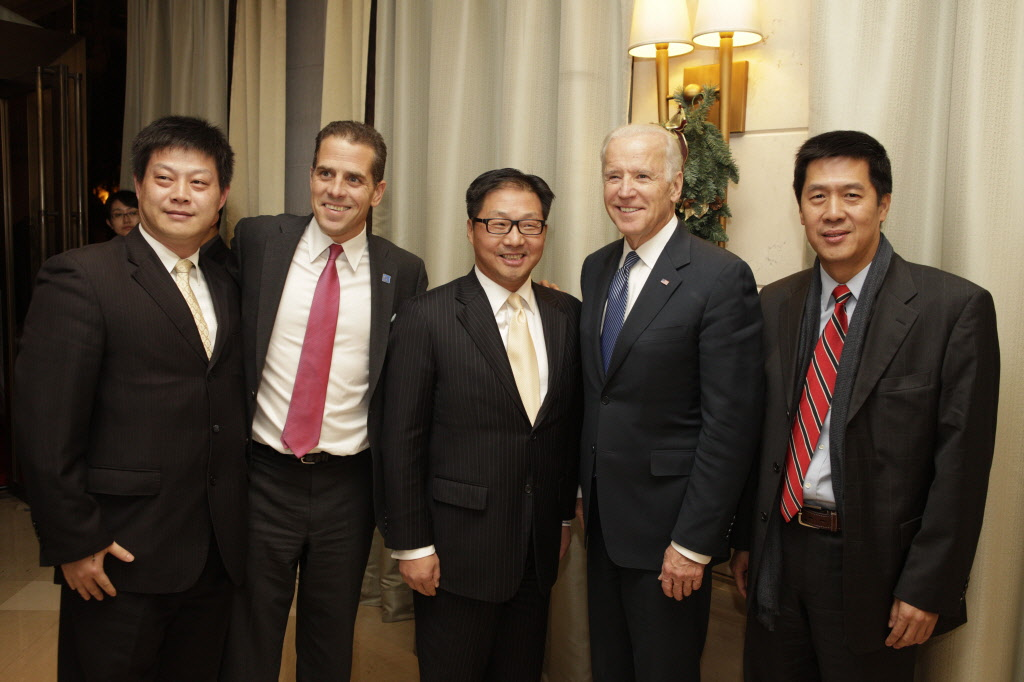
Hunter Biden and then-vice president Joe Biden posing for a photograph with BHR Partners CEO Jonathan Li (center) and managing partner Ming Xue (right) in China, 2013

According to The Wall Street Journal, "Bohai is China's oldest private equity firm, having launched the country's first yuan-denominated fund in 2006. Harvest Fund Management is one of China's largest asset managers, with previous private equity ventures, including with a jointly held fund investing in both domestic and overseas real estate". Thornton Group is a Boston-based cross-border investment advisory firm founded by Michael Lin and James Bulger, son of former Massachusetts state Senate President William Bulger and nephew of Whitey Bulger. Rosemont Seneca is a Washington, D.C.–based investment and advisory firm, founded by Devon Archer, Christopher Heinz, and Hunter Biden, who is the son of U.S. President Joe Biden. According to The New Yorker, in June 2013, "[Jonathan] Li, Archer, and other business partners signed a memorandum of understanding to create the fund, which they named BHR Partners, and, in November, they signed contracts related to the deal. Hunter became an unpaid member of BHR’s board but did not take an equity stake in BHR Partners until after his father left the White House [as U.S. Vice President]".

== Fundraising ==
The firm set out in 2014 to raise $1.5 billion for investments, some in dollars and some in yuan. The yuan investments were to be converted to U.S. dollars through Shanghai Free-Trade Zone, facilitating offshore investment for Chinese investors. The website said the company has "the support of Bank of China, China Development Bank Capital, and other major Chinese financial institutions. Bohai Harvest has also partnered with a subsidiary of China's conglomerate HNA Group.

== Transactions ==
- 2014 - Approximately RMB4 billion in the Chinese pilot State-Owned Enterprises reform deal "involving the segregation and capitalization of Sinopec Group’s non-oil business into Sinopec Marketing Corporation";
- 2015 - Henniges Automotive with strategic partner, AVIC Auto; total transaction valued at around US$600 million; Reuters reported that the "deal was subject to review by the Committee on Foreign Investment in the United States (CFIUS), and in August 2019, Senate Finance Committee Chairman Chuck Grassley raised concern about the CFIUS process, citing potential conflicts of interest." The state-run AVIC was involved in stealing sensitive data regarding the Joint Strike Fighter program and later incorporated the stolen data into China’s Chengdu J-20 and Shenyang FC-31 fighters.
- In 2017, BHR invested in a Chinese technology company Megvii. BHR, according to reporting in The Intercept, invested in Face++, a mobile phone app built by the Chinese government to introduce a mass surveillance state and spy on its citizens. The application has been used to spy on Muslims in China's western province of Xinjiang, where ethnic Uyghurs are being held in “re-education” camps, providing government authorities access to data that shows personal information.
- Investments in 3Bio Inc., and Didi Taxi.
- Investments in China's main nuclear energy firms, China General Nuclear Power Group (CGN). In 2016, the U.S. Justice Department charged CGN with stealing nuclear secrets from the United States.
- In November, 2016, BHR agreed to purchase Lundin Mining Corp's minority stake in African copper mine Tenke Fungurume Mining S.A. for $1.14 billion in cash. Lundin held a 30% interest in TF Holdings, a holding company, and an effective 24% stake in the mining operation. Freeport-McMoRan Inc. currently owns the remaining 70% stake in TF Holdings (an effective 56% of the mine), but is in the process of selling its stake to China Molybdenum Co. for a reported $2.65 billion. The Democratic Republic of the Congo, where the Tenke mine is located, owns the remaining 20% of the mine. According to Oxfam, "the Government of DRC knew nothing about [transaction] until after it happened."

== Controversy ==
In November 2021, The New York Times reported that BHR Partners helped finance a coal-mining company in Australia that was controlled by a Chinese state-owned enterprise, as well as assisted a subsidiary of a Chinese defense company in acquiring an auto parts manufacturer in Michigan. It also reported in detail how BHR, whose founding board members included Hunter Biden, son of U.S. President Joe Biden, facilitated the purchase of Tenke Fungurume Mine, one of the world's richest cobalt mines in a US$3.8 billion deal in the Democratic Republic of the Congo by China Molybdenum, a Chinese state-owned mining company. The New York Times report said while BHR's role in the mine purchase did not attract much attention when Biden was running for President, it had received newfound scrutiny in light of Biden's warning that China's domination of the cobalt market could undermine American efforts to electrify its car industry. The deal has drawn criticism from a variety of sources for the possible involvement of Hunter Biden, including his continued 10% ownership stake in BHR, although a former BHR board member told the Times that Biden and the other American BHR founders were not involved in the mine deal. Hunter Biden's possible involvement in the deal has also been criticized due to President Joe Biden's ongoing push for electric vehicles, of which cobalt is a key material.
