= Prudnik Synagogue =

Former Reform synagogue in Neustadt in Oberschlesien, Germany

- Polish: Synagoga w Prudniku
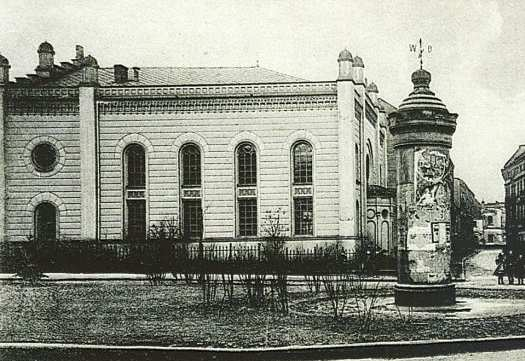
- The former synagoge in the 19th century

- Location of the former synagogue in Germany, as it was in 1937. now part of Poland

Religion
- Affiliation: Reform Judaism (former)
- Ecclesiastical or organizational status: Synagogue (1877–1938)
- Status: Destroyed

Location
- Location: Klasztorna St, Neustadt in Oberschlesien
- Country: Germany (now Poland)
- Interactive map of Prudnik Synagogue
- Coordinates: 50°19′16″N 17°34′37″E

Architecture
- Architect: Smith
- Type: Synagogue architecture
- Style: Moorish Revival
- Founder: Samuel Fränkel
- Completed: 1877
- Destroyed: November 1938 (during Kristallnacht
- Dome: Four

The Prudnik Synagogue (Polish: Synagoga w Prudniku) was a former Reform Jewish congregation and synagogue, located in Neustadt in Oberschlesien, Germany, that today is located in Prudnik, Poland. The synagogue was destroyed by Nazis on November 9, 1938, during Kristallnacht.

== History ==
The synagogue was built in 1877, designed by Smith in the Moorish Revival style. The congregation was founded by the industrialist Samuel Fränkel. It was burnt down by Nazi militia during the Kristallnacht on 9–10 November 1938.

== See also ==
- History of the Jews in Germany
- History of the Jews in Poland
- List of synagogues in Germany (in German)
- List of synagogues in Poland
