= Jinduicheng Molybdenum =

Chinese manufacturing company

Jinduicheng Molybdenum Group Mining Corporation 金堆城钼业股份有限公司
- Company type: State-owned enterprise
- Industry: Molybdenum manufacturing
- Founded: 1958
- Headquarters: Xi'an, People's Republic of China
- Area served: People's Republic of China, Hong Kong, Canada
- Products: Metallurgical
- Number of employees: 9000
- Website: (in English) Jinduicheng Molybdenum Group Mining Corporation

Jinduicheng Molybdenum Group Mining Corporation (SSE: 601958) is a Chinese company which is engaged in molybdenum production, sales and manufacturing. This company provides molybdenum charging materials, including roasted molybdenum concrete powder and ferromolybdenum; molybdenum metal products, including molybdenum powder, molybdenum slabs, molybdenum rods and molybdenum wires, among others, as well as molybdenum chemical products, including ammonium molybdate, molybdenum disulfide and molybdenum oxide, among others.

This company is listed on the Shanghai Stock Exchange.

== See also ==
- Tongling Nonferrous Metals
- China Molybdenum
