= Samuel Fränkel =

German industrialist

- שמואל פרנקל
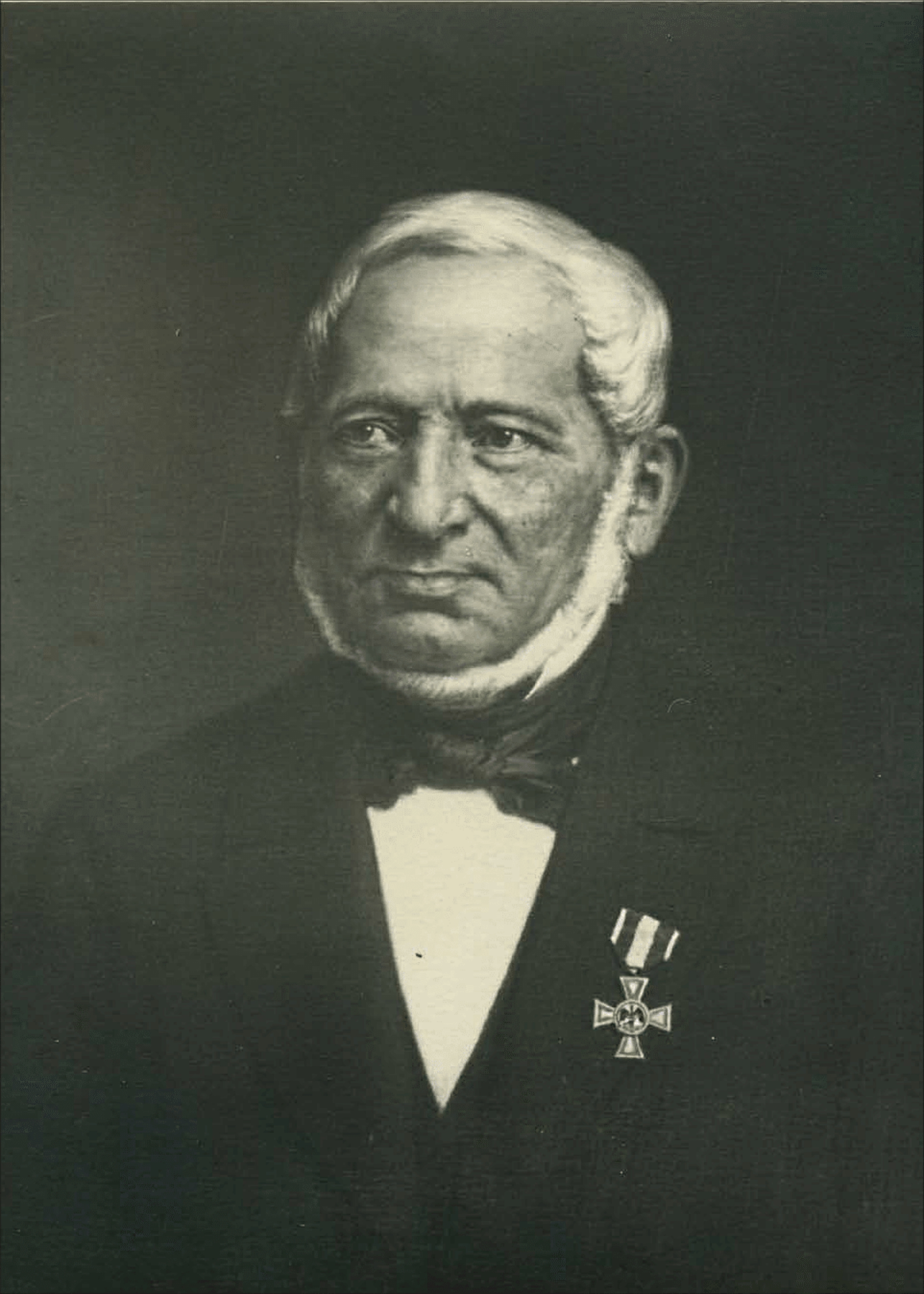
- Born: 22 November 1801; Zülz
- Died: 28 July 1881 (age 79); Neustadt O.S.
- Resting place: Jewish cemetery in Prudnik
- Citizenship: German
- Spouse: Ester Polke
- Children: Zwi, Menachem, Jehuda, Akiba, Dorothea, Cäcilie, Josef, Jenny, Abraham, Albert, Auguste, Rosalie, Emanuel, Hermann
- Parents: Abraham Isaak Fränkel (father); Chandel Fränkel (mother)
- Relatives: Max Pinkus

Samuel Fränkel (Hebrew: שמואל פרנקל; 22 November 1801 – 28 July 1881) was a German industrialist.

== Life ==
Samuel Fränkel was born 22 November 1801 in Zülz (currently Biała, Poland). In 1827 he moved to Neustadt O.S. (currently Prudnik). He founded a linen and terrycloth factory in 1845, at the shore of Prudnik river. It quickly became one of the biggest terrycloth factories in Europe. Fränkel opened a few branches in Berlin and Augsburg. The company was confiscated from the Fränkel family by Nazis in 1938, under the Nuremberg Laws that prohibited German Jews from owning property. Post-war, the company reopened under the name Zakłady Przemysłu Bawełnianego "Frotex".

== Family ==
He was a grandfather of Max Pinkus.

== Death ==
Samuel Fränkel died 28 July 1881 in Neustadt O.S.
