= John Peter Galanis =

American businessman and fraudster

- Born: John Peter Galanis
- Known for: Being a notorious white-collar criminal
- Children: Four sons
- Status: Incarcerated at the Federal Correctional Institution, Terminal Island in San Pedro, California
- Criminal charge: Securities fraud
- Penalty: 120 months

John Peter Galanis (born 1943) is an American financier in the 1970s and 1980s, who became a notorious white-collar criminal. Galanis has four sons and, at the age of 76, is currently incarcerated at Federal Correctional Institution, Terminal Island in San Pedro, California, after being convicted in 2019 for defrauding a Native American tribal entity and various investment advisory clients of tens of millions of dollars in a fraudulent and deceptive bond scam.

== Early life ==
Galanis was born in the Boston, Massachusetts area where his father owned and operated a diner and a tourist motel. He went to law school for a year and quit to work on Wall Street.

== Crimes ==
=== 1970s ===
In 1971, three investors in a company named Armstrong Investors amended a civil complaint in the United States District Court for the Southern District of New York, in the case of Delfino v. Armstrong Investors S.A., seeking to recover $13.5 million in damages for the alleged weakening of their investment by fraudulent or negligent conduct of Armstrong, its affiliates and partners, including Everest Management Corporation (the investment manager for Armstrong). Galanis was an officer.

Ultimately, nine criminal actions were brought for violations of the securities laws. Galanis was charged with looting the securities and cash of domestic and offshore mutual funds and also charged with engaging in a scheme to defraud domestic and foreign mutual funds, and was sentenced to prison.

=== 1980s ===
On June 8, 1983, Galanis was charged, along with two former Chase Manhattan Bank vice presidents with stealing $9.5 million from Chase through fraudulent loans in 1978 and 1979. The case was brought by Manhattan District Attorney, Robert M. Morgenthau.

==== Tax shelter fraud ====
On May 12, 1987, Galanis was charged in separate federal and state cases in Manhattan with stealing more than $115 million from investors and cheating the government of millions of dollars in false tax deductions. Galanis was promoting a tax shelter.

In the federal case, as announced by then United States Attorney Rudolph W. Giuliani in Manhattan, involved "a massive racketeering scheme" with Galanis operating a tax shelter program that obtained about $40 million from about 2,500 investors. Giuliani called Galanis "a career white-collar criminal." The scheme was this: Galanis's company lent the investors $4 for each $1 they invested and told them that they were eligible to deduct four times their actual investment on their taxes. However, the loans were fabricated.

In the New York state case, Galanis was charged with selling real-estate tax shelters involving the Nashua Trust Company, which was said to be acquiring and developing non-casino hotels in Atlantic City. None of that work ever happened. As many as 1,400 investors entrusted Galanis with $75 million. The cash was used to pay other debts with $6 million going to Galanis's family. Comedy film actor Eddie Murphy was an investor with Galanis.

==== Mutual fund fraud ====
On September 16, 1987, a new 58-count Racketeer Influenced and Corrupt Organizations Act (RICO) indictment was served to Galanis, along with eight others, for a Greenwich, Connecticut-based racketeering enterprise. Here, Galanis' company took control of three mutual funds in Oakland, California, ISI Trust Fund, ISI Growth Fund, and ISI Income Fund. Galanis was accused of obtaining $3.9 million by selling the funds' securities at inflated prices and also fraudulently obtaining control of the Columbia Federal Savings Bank of Westport, Connecticut through lying to the Federal Home Loan Bank Board .

On September 29, 1988, Galanis was ultimately sentenced to 27 years in federal prison for 44 counts of involvement in a racketeering enterprise after being convicted in July 1988, of which he served 13 years. He stated at his sentencing: "My arrogance did not allow me to fully examine the events through another's eyes. I thought of myself as a kind man, imparting good values, not a racketeer".

=== 2000s ===
In 2001, Galanis was released from prison on a work release program and disappeared.

In 2019, he was tried and sentenced to 10 years in federal prison, and is currently incarcerated at Federal Correctional Institution, Terminal Island in San Pedro, California, after being convicted in 2019 for defrauding a Native American tribal entity and various investment advisory clients of tens of millions of dollars in a fraudulent and deceptive bond scam. His son, Jason, a former business partner of Hunter Biden, was convicted in the same scheme in 2017 and sentenced to 173 months. He was pardoned by trump in March 2025.
