= China Express Airlines =

Chinese airline

China Express Airlines 华夏航空

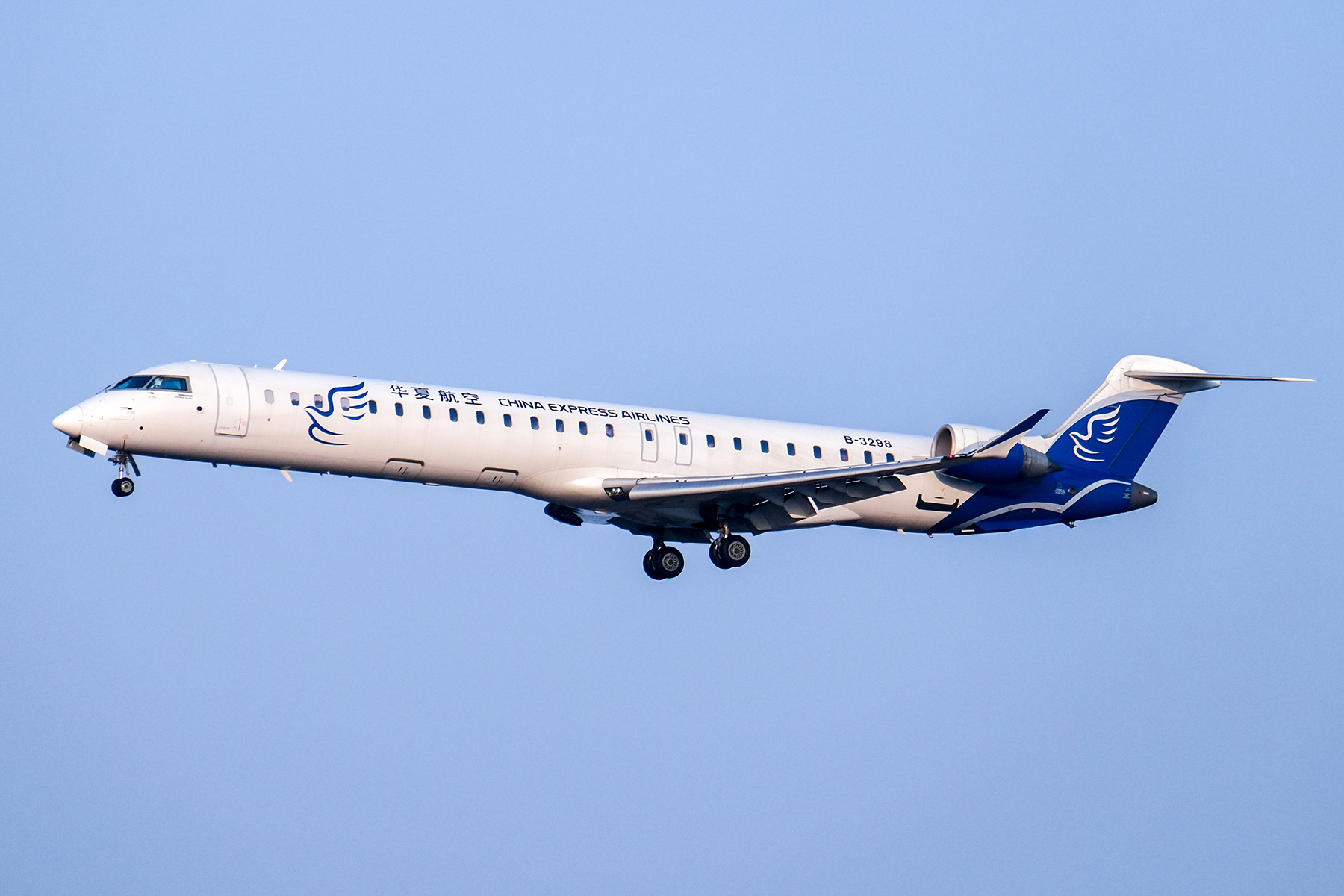
- A China Express Bombardier CRJ-900
IATA	ICAO	Call sign
G5	HXA	CHINA EXPRESS
- Founded: 18 April 2006; 20 years ago
- Hubs: Chongqing
- Focus cities: Guiyang; Hohhot
- Fleet size: 77
- Destinations: 133
- Traded as: SZSE: 002928
- Headquarters: Chongqing Jiangbei International Airport; Chongqing, China
- Key people: Hu Xiaojun (Chairman); Wu Longjiang (President)
- Employees: More than 2,000
- Website: www.chinaexpressair.com

China Express
- Simplified Chinese: 华夏航空股份公司
- Traditional Chinese: 華夏航空股份公司
Transcriptions
Standard Mandarin
- Hanyu Pinyin: Huáxià Hángkōng gōngsī

China Express Airlines (simplified Chinese: 华夏航空; traditional Chinese: 華夏航空; pinyin: Huáxià Hángkōng), stylised as China Express, is a regional airline with its corporate headquarters on the grounds of Chongqing Jiangbei International Airport, Chongqing, China.

== History ==
China Express Airlines, also known as Huaxia Airlines, is China's first private regional airline. The airline was established in May 2006 and is owned by Cathay Fortune (40%), High Zero (25%), Tampines International (24%) and others (11%).

On August 28, 2010, a China Express Bombardier Bombardier CRJ200 regional jet scraped the ground on landing at Guiyang Airport in southwest China. No one was injured during the incident. On 1 September 2010, China's Civil Aviation Administration ordered the airline to suspend operations after a landing incident at Guiyang Longdongbao International Airport in which an aircraft's right wing made contact with the runway during landing. The airline was ordered to review its safety regulations and perform an investigation into the incident. On 6 September, CAAC allowed the airline to resume partial operations; according to a spokesperson, the company planned to resume full operations within two weeks.

== Corporate affairs ==
The airline was previously headquartered on the grounds of Chongqing Jiangbei International Airport in Chongqing.

== Destinations ==
China Express has Codeshare agreements with the following airlines:

- Air China
- China Eastern Airlines
- Loong Air
- Shandong Airlines
- Shenzhen Airlines
- Sichuan Airlines
- XiamenAir

== Fleet ==
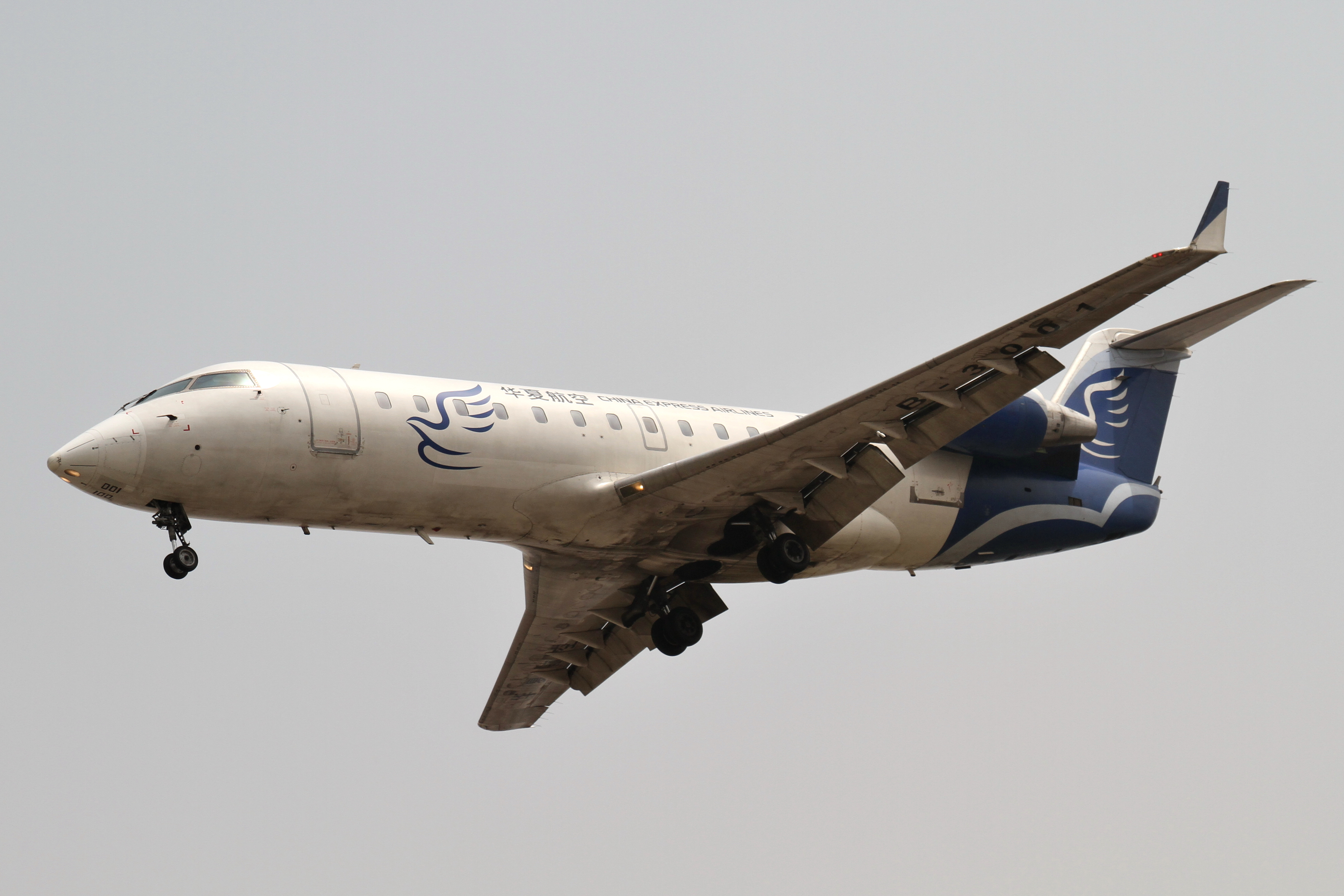
China Express CRJ200

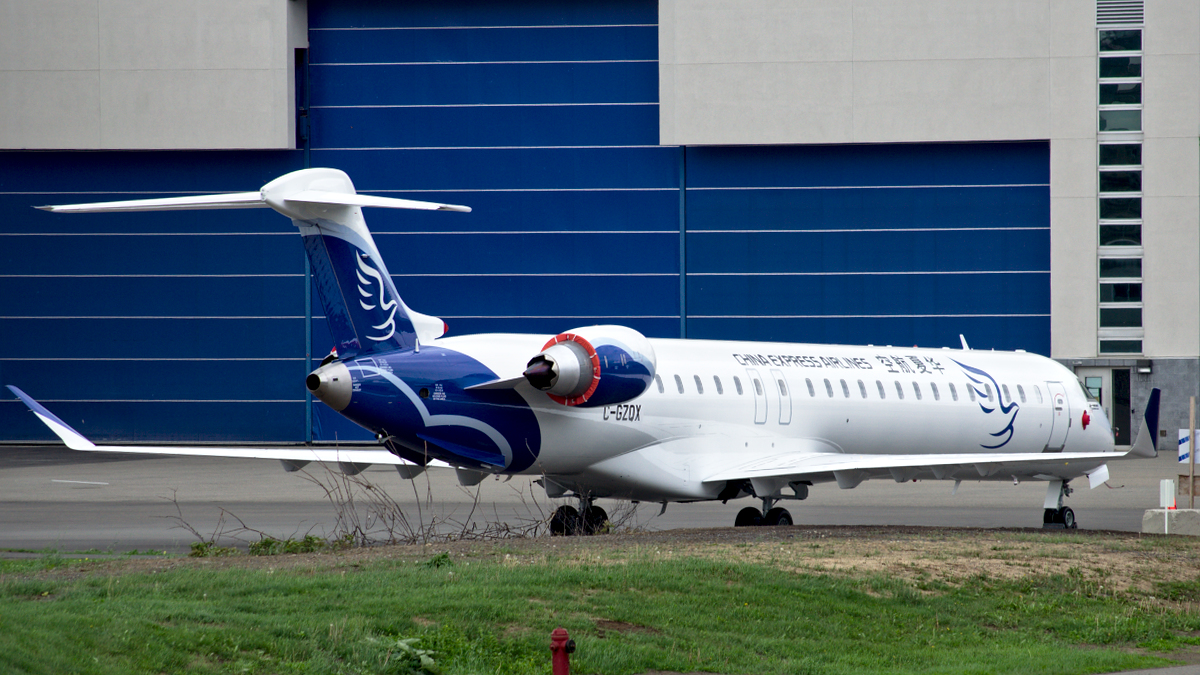
China Express CRJ900 at the Bombardier plant at Montréal–Mirabel International Airport.

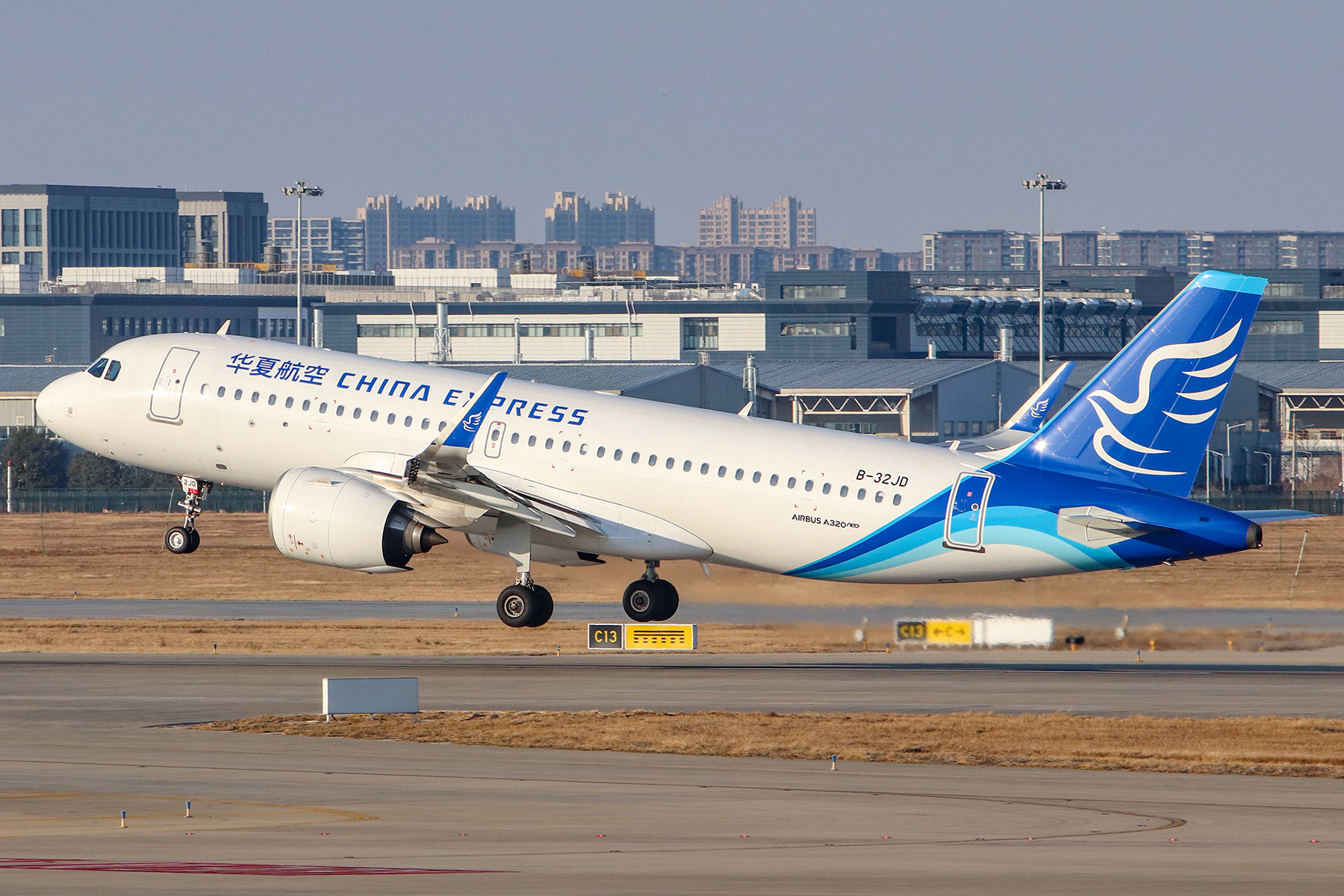
China Express A320neo taking off from Zhengzhou Xinzheng International Airport.

As of September 2025, China Express Airlines operate the following aircraft:

China Express fleet
Aircraft	In Service	Orders	Passengers			Notes
Aircraft	In Service	Orders	J	Y	Total	Notes
Airbus A320-200	11	—	4	168	172	
Airbus A320neo	20	—	4	168	172	
Bombardier CRJ900	33	—	6	78	84	
Comac C909	13	37	—	95	95	
Total	77	37				

In October 2011, China Express signed a conditional order for six CRJ900 NextGen aircraft with an option for an additional five. The deal was announced on February 10, 2012. On July 7, 2012, the conditional order was converted into a firm order.

In 2014, the airline signed a deal for a further 16 Bombardier CRJ900 aircraft, including 8 options.

On April 30, 2015, China Express retired its final CRJ 200 with the last flight from Shanghai Pudong International Airport to Chongqing Jiangbei International Airport operating as flight G52006. On December 31, 2015, the company exercised eight of its options and placed a firm order for 10 CRJ 900 aircraft.
