= Boa Vista mine =

Mine in Goiás, Brazil

- Location within Brazil
- Location: Catalão, Goiás, Brazil; 18.050829818124278°S 47.86602403898481°W
- Products: Niobium; Phosphate
- Opened: 2000
- Company: China Molybdenum
- Website: en.cmoc.com/html/Business/BRA-Nb-P/

The Boa Vista mine is an open pit niobium and phosphate mine located near the city of Catalão in Goiás state in Brazil. Geologically, it is located on the Catalão II carbonatite complex.

The mine was opened by Anglo American plc, and had an output of 4,700 tons of niobium in 2014. In 2016, the mine, along with several associated processing plants, was sold to China Molybdenum. The sale was strongly criticized by then presidential candidate Jair Bolsonaro during his 2018 presidential campaign, for reasons of economic nationalism.

== See also ==
- Companhia Brasileira de Metalurgia e Mineração
