= IXM =

Metals trading company

- Company type: Public
- Industry: Commodities; Metals and Mining
- Founded: 2005; 21 years ago (As Louis Dreyfus Metals)
- Headquarters: Geneva, Switzerland
- Area served: Worldwide
- Key people: Kenny Ives (CEO)
- Products: Metals Concentrate and Refined Metals
- Revenue: US$ 12.524 billion (2017)
- Operating income: Undisclosed
- Net income: US$ 92.3 million (2017)
- Total assets: US$ 3085.6 million (2017)
- Total equity: US$ 407.0 million (2017)
- Owner: China Molybdenum
- Number of employees: Over 420
- Website: www.ixmetals.com

IXM S.A. is a base metal commodity trading company with headquarters in Geneva, Switzerland. It is regarded as the third biggest metals trading company aside from Glencore and Trafigura. The current company was rebranded from "LDC Metals" to "IXM" after the transaction from LDC Group to the Chinese fund NCCL Natural Resources Investment Fund was completed in May 2018. It is a global merchant in base and precious metals, and is among the top copper, zinc and lead concentrates merchandizers, and a leader in refined copper, zinc, aluminium and nickel markets.

IXM's business started in 2005 when Louis Dreyfus Company acquired Mitsui & Co's copper concentrates book. The business was expanded rapidly afterwards, when IXM broadened its reach to multiple raw and refined metal books. In 2012, IXM acquired 51% stake of GKE metal with $8m, as a step of its expansion into metals warehousing business. The GKE Metal's stake was sold to a sister company of LDC in Nov 2017, as per a company filing of Louis Dreyfus Company.

China Molybdenum took full control IXM in July 2019.
