= Devon Archer =

American businessman (born 1974)

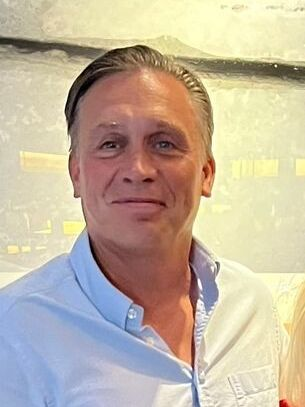
- Archer in 2024
- Born: May 31, 1974 (age 52); Glen Cove, New York, U.S.
- Education: North Shore High School; Yale University (BA)

Devon Archer (born May 31, 1974) is an American businessman and venture capital and private-equity fund investor. He was a founding board member of BHR Partners, a Chinese investment company, in 2013. From April 2014 to October 2019, Archer and his business partner Hunter Biden served on the board of Burisma Holdings, one of the largest private natural gas producers in Ukraine.

== Early life ==
Archer was born in Glen Cove, New York (Nassau County, Long Island) and attended North Shore High School in Glen Head, New York, then matriculated at Yale University where he played lacrosse. Archer was the roommate of John Kerry's stepson, Christopher Heinz, while both were students at Yale. Immediately after his graduation from Yale in 1996, Archer worked for Citibank Vietnam for several years.

Archer returned to the United States to serve as a senior adviser to the John Kerry 2004 presidential campaign, co-chairing the campaign's national finance committee; as of 2014, he was a trustee of the Heinz Family Office.

== International investor and financier ==
In 2008, Devon Archer and Hunter Biden co-founded the U.S. investment advisory company Rosemont Seneca Partners. Rosemont Capital, a private-equity firm co-founded by Archer and Christopher Heinz in 2009, owned 50% of Rosemont Seneca Partners.

According to The New York Times, during Joe Biden’s tenure as vice president, firms run by Hunter Biden and Archer "pursued business with international entities that had a stake in American foreign policy decisions, sometimes in countries where connections implied political influence and protection."

=== BHR Partners ===
Archer, Biden, and Chinese financier Jonathan Li founded the China-based private equity fund BHR Partners in 2013. Through Rosemont Seneca Partners, Archer and Biden each held 10% equity in BHR. U.S.-based Thornton Group LLC had a 10% equity stake, and asset managers registered in China owned the rest. The Chinese-registered asset managers are the Bank of China (via Bohai Industrial Investment Fund Management) and Deutsche Bank-backed Harvest Fund Management.

The New York Times reported that BHR Partners advised a Chinese state-owned enterprise in its acquisition of an Australian mining company, assisted a subsidiary of a Chinese defense company to buy a Michigan auto parts manufacturer, and facilitated the purchase by a Chinese firm of a highly productive cobalt mine in Democratic Republic of Congo for US$3.8 billion. A former BHR board member told the Times that Archer, Biden, and the other American partners of BHR were uninvolved in the mine transaction.

=== Burisma ===
In April 2014, Burisma chairman of the board Alan Apter asked Archer to join the board of directors of the company; Archer accepted. Three weeks later, Hunter Biden was appointed to the board as well. Burisma Holdings is owned by Ukrainian oligarch and former politician Mykola Zlochevsky. Christopher Heinz, John Kerry's stepson, was not involved in advising Burisma due to his concern about the associated reputational risk. Archer remained on the board of directors of Burisma until 2016.

==== Testimony ====
In 2015, career diplomat George P. Kent expressed concern over the perception of conflict of interest due to Hunter Biden's and Archer's directorship of Burisma given Vice President Biden's official role working with Ukraine. This was amplified under the Trump administration, also in 2019, as unproven speculation that Joe Biden had engaged in corrupt activities related to Burisma. In 2023, the U.S. House Oversight Committee initiated an investigation to determine whether Joe Biden was involved in his son's business affairs and if the two men accepted bribes from Burisma owner Zlochevsky.

Archer provided more than four hours of closed-door testimony to committee members on July 31, 2023. Archer testified that over the course of 10 years, Hunter Biden put his father on speakerphone about 20 times while in the presence of business associates.

Democratic congressman Dan Goldman said Archer testified that Hunter Biden sold the "illusion of access" to his father in business meetings. Republican congressman Andy Biggs said the testimony implicated the president directly and that an impeachment inquiry was necessary. Republican congressman Jim Jordan said the testimony revealed new information but did not elaborate.

=== Association with Yelena Baturina ===
In 2014, Russian businessperson Yelena Baturina, the wife of former Moscow mayor Yury Luzhkov, wire-transferred $3.5 million to Rosemont Seneca Thornton. The Washington Post reported in April 2022 that the partners of Rosemont Seneca Thornton had agreed to dissolve the organization before the 2014 wire transfer, though it continued to be operated by Devon Archer to facilitate real estate transactions for central Asia investors. Archer received the $3.5 million wire from Baturina to purchase property on her behalf in Brooklyn, New York.

== Oglala tribe fraud ==
In 2015, Archer and his associates, including Jason Galanis and his father, John, urged the Oglala Nation, a Native American tribe in South Dakota, to issue $60 million of bonds. They used the funds from the bond sale for themselves, instead of investing the money for the benefit of the Oglala community. Archer illegally transferred $20 million of the proceeds through his real estate company, Rosemont Seneca "to satisfy the net capital requirements of two other Archer-controlled companies".

A federal jury in Manhattan convicted Archer of securities fraud in 2018. In 2019, U.S. District Judge Ronnie Abrams overturned the verdict and ordered a new trial for Archer. In October 2020, federal prosecutors appealed Abrams' decision to a three-judge panel of the U.S. Court of Appeals for the Second Circuit which ordered that Archer be sentenced for the 2018 conviction of securities fraud and conspiracy.

On February 28, 2022, Judge Abrams sentenced him to a year and a day in prison for misuse of bond funds issued by an economic-development corporation affiliated the with Oglala Sioux tribe. Archer was also ordered to make restitution to fund investors of over $43 million. His petition to appeal the conviction was rejected by the U.S. Supreme Court in late January 2024.

On May 15, 2024, Judge Abrams vacated his sentence, with re-sentencing ordered, due to a prosecutorial sentencing guidelines error that had been overlooked by his defense counsel.

On March 25, 2025, Archer received a presidential pardon from Donald Trump for his 2018 conviction in the Oglala Sioux tribal-bond case. News reports noted the pardon followed the Supreme Court's January 2024 refusal to hear his appeal.

== Family ==
Archer is married to a podiatrist and has three children.

== See also ==
- List of people granted executive clemency in the second Trump presidency
