= Yu Yong =

Chinese businessman

- Born: February 27, 1961 (age 65); Wafangdian, China
- Occupation: Businessman

Yu Yong (Chinese: 于泳; born 1961) is a Chinese businessman. He is the founder and head of the Cathay Fortune Corp., also known as Hongshang Industrial Holdings Group which is an investor in the mining company China Molybdenum. Cathay Fortune's operations are based out of Shanghai. As of March 2024, Forbes estimated his net worth at US$10.0 billion.

In 2012, Cathay made a AUS$830 hostile bid to take over the Australia-based Discovery Metals. The bid was made with loans from the China-Africa Development Fund. Cathay walked away from the deal, due to concerns about the Boseto copper project in Botswana.

In addition to his extensive interests in the mining industry, Yu has also been involved in other business ventures and investment undertakings. He is a major shareholder in Contemporary Amperex Technology (CATL), a Chinese battery maker that went public in 2018. Prior to its initial public offering (IPO) in 2018, Yu acquired a 1.69% stake in Contemporary Amperex Technology via a pre-IPO sale. His holding company Cathay Fortune is also the largest shareholder at 40% of China Express Airlines.

Beyond his forays in the industrial manufacturing and mining industries, Yu has also ventured into real estate development, and is a major investor in the Shanghai real estate market. His holding company, Cathay Fortune, is also involved in the financial services sector and has investments in several Chinese banks and financial institutions.

Despite his entrepreneurial and investment success, Yu has faced some controversies in his business dealings. His hostile bid for the Australian mining company, Discovery Metals, was met with resistance from the Australian government and shareholders. Additionally, his involvement in the Boseto copper project in Botswana was criticized for its potential negative impact on the local environment and communities.

== Personal life ==
Yu is married and lives in Shanghai, China.
