= Zakłady Przemysłu Bawełnianego "Frotex" =

Zakłady Przemysłu Bawełnianego "Frotex" S.A.

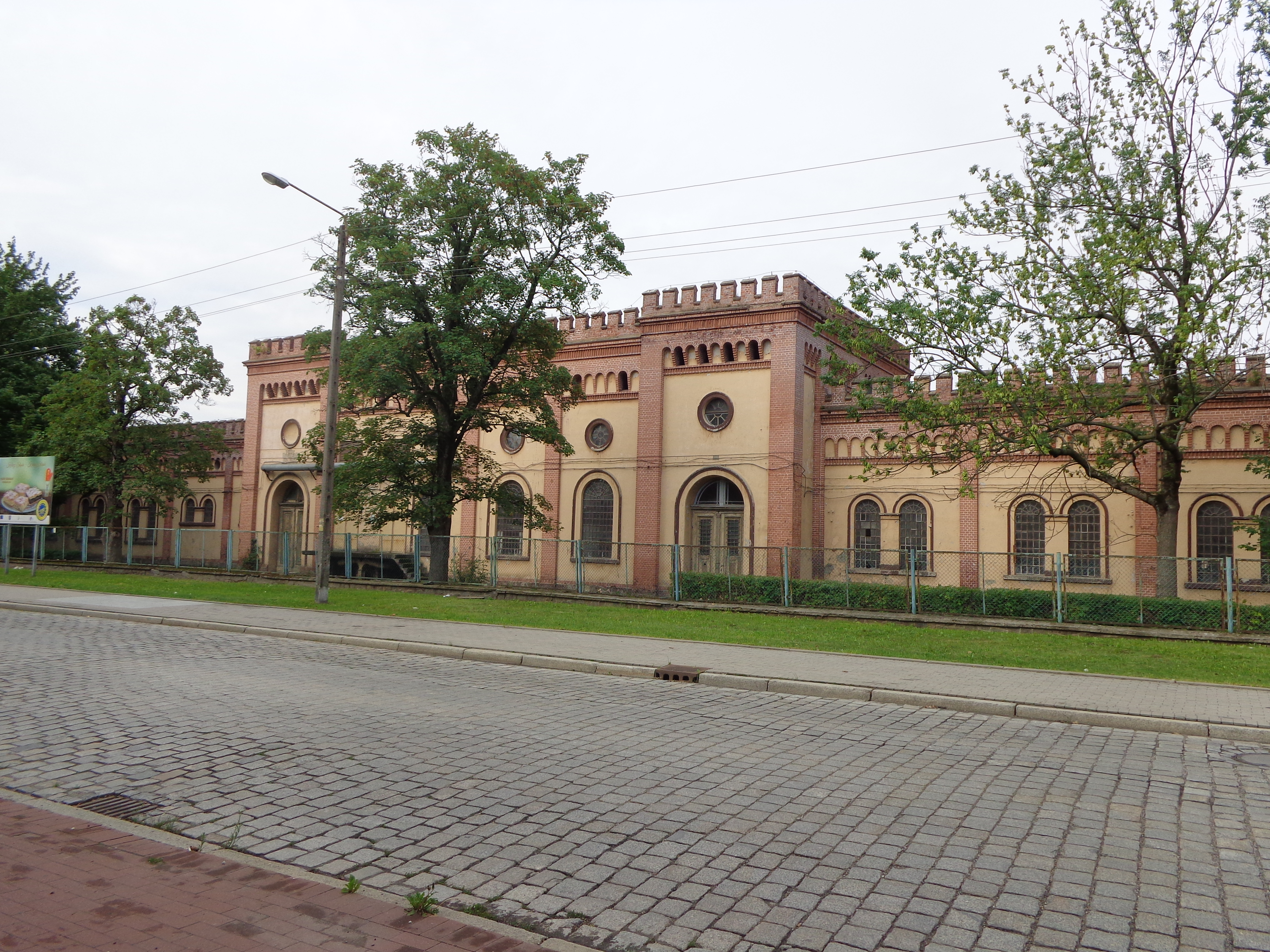
- Industry: Textile industry
- Founded: 1845
- Founder: Samuel Fränkel
- Defunct: 5 July 2014
- Fate: Dissolved
- Headquarters: Prudnik, Poland
- Products: Textiles

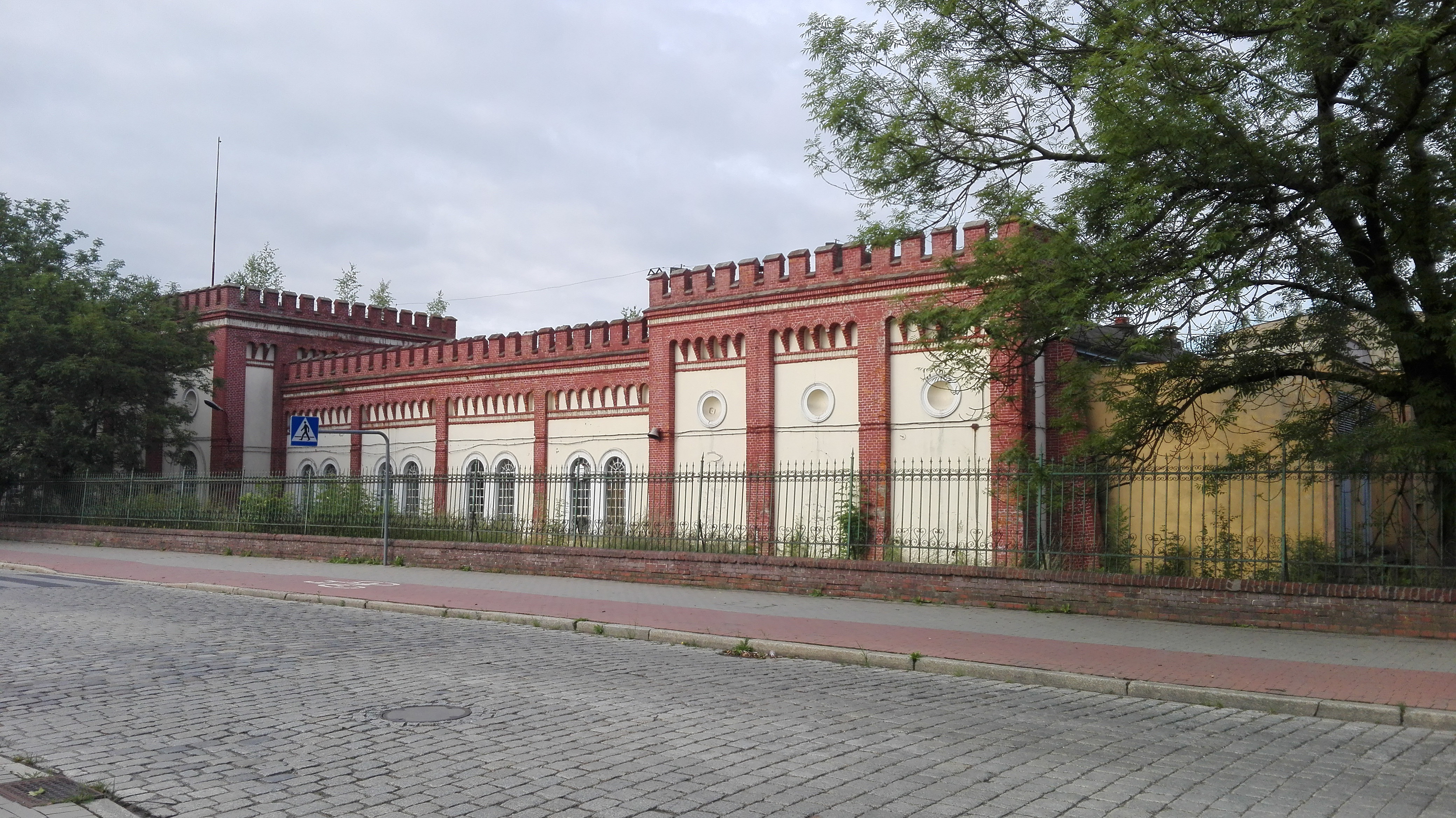
Weaving mill

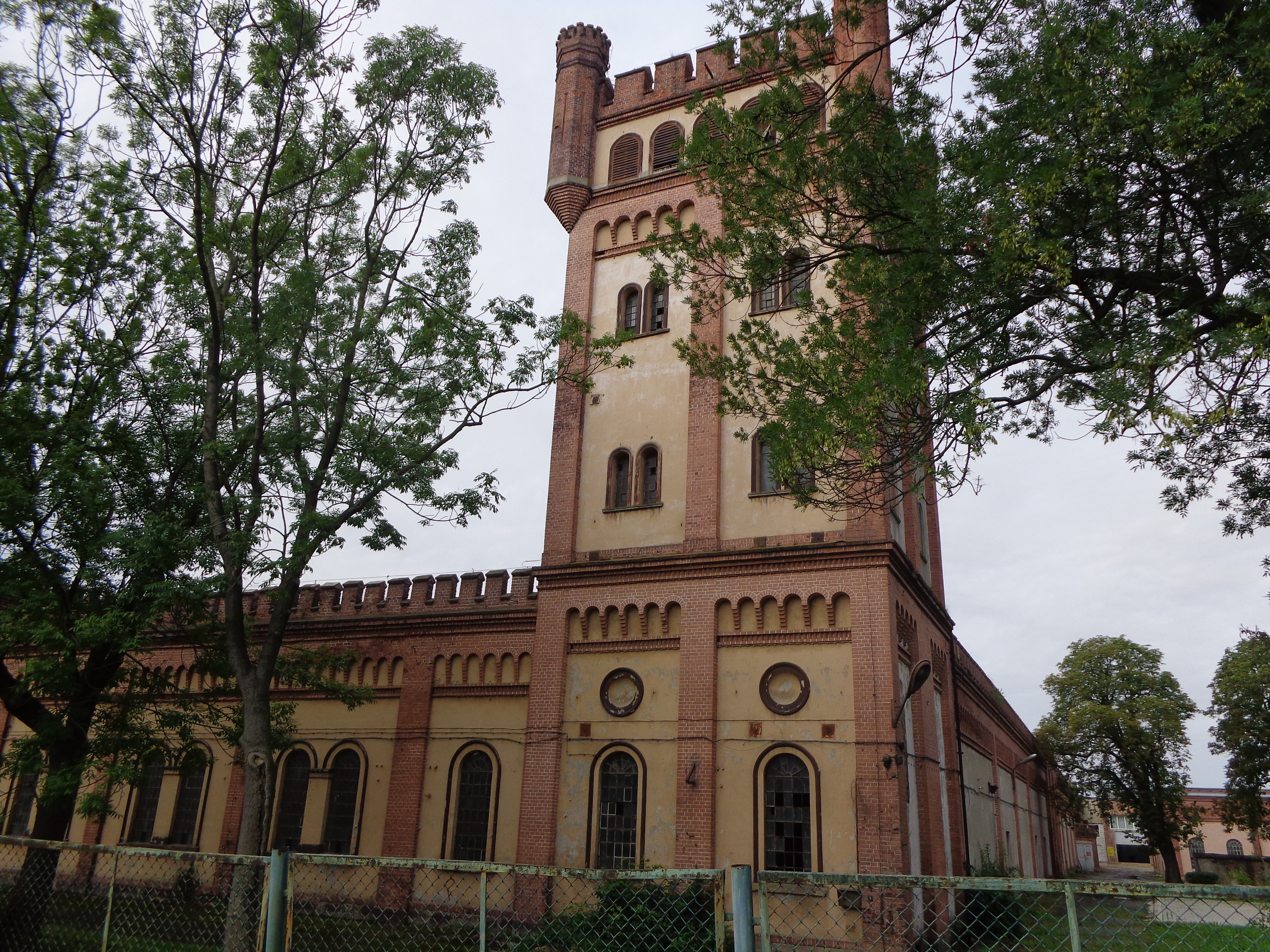
Water tower

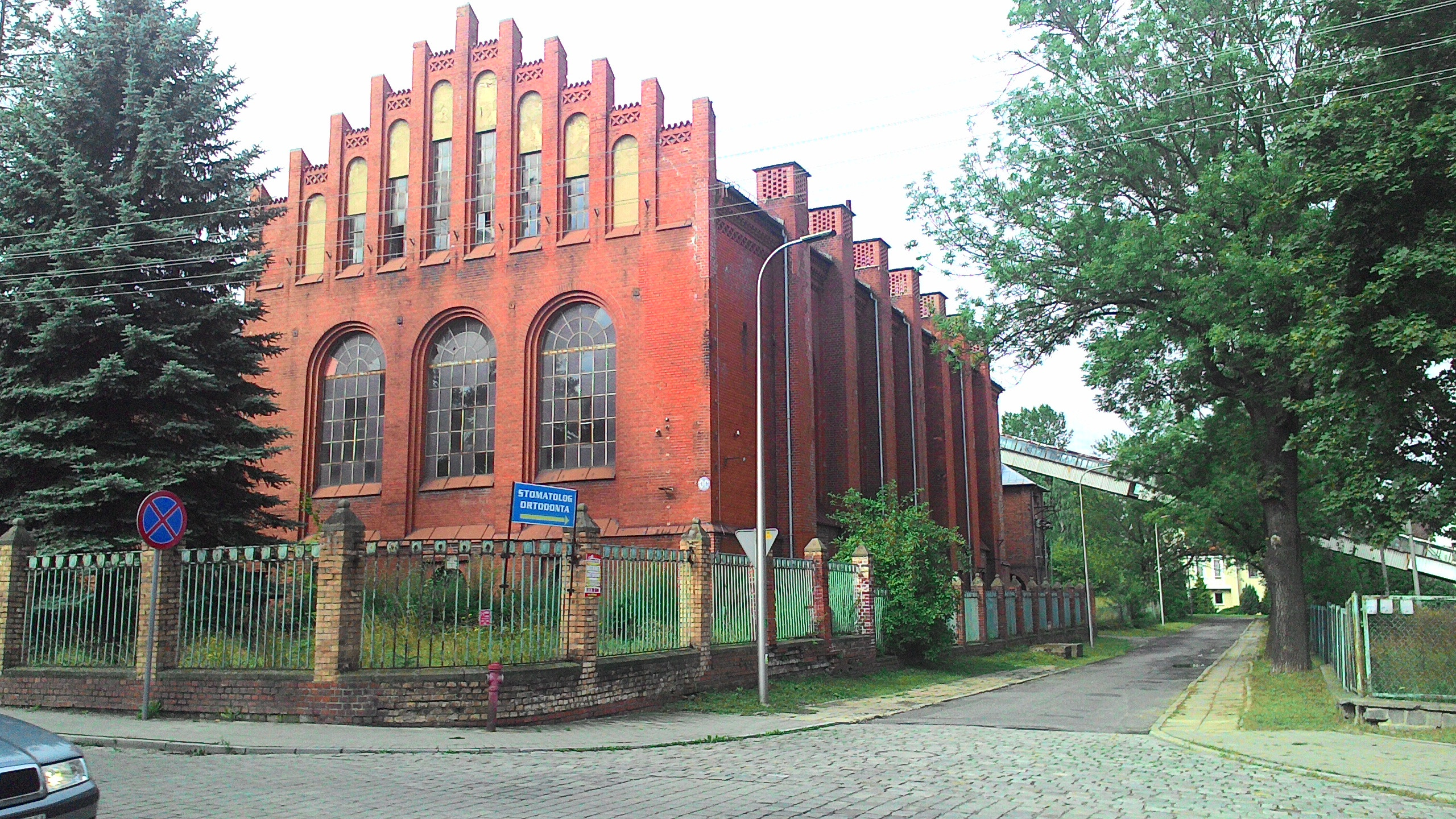
Power station

Zakłady Przemysłu Bawełnianego "Frotex" S.A., based in Prudnik, was a manufacturer of textiles which were exported to a number of countries including Italy, Belgium, Spain, Denmark, Slovenia, Croatia, the United Kingdom, the United States, and Australia.

== History ==
Frotex S.A. began as the S. Fränkel Linen Works in 1845, when Samuel Fränkel started a linen textile factory in the area of modern Prudnik (until 1945 Neustadt), in Silesia. Soon after, the factory took over a local competitor, which went bankrupt, and gained a monopoly in the region. Fränkel's descendents Joseph and Max Pinkus oversaw the expansion of the company's production. The production of towels and terrycloth began in 1903. The By the interwar period, the factory's products had become known in the German, English, French and American markets.

Due to the Nazi regime's legislation restricting the rights of German Jews, including the prohibition of Jewish people from owning businesses, the factory was confiscated from the Fränkel-Pinkus family in 1938 and the family was forced to flee Germany. The company was then renamed Schlesische Feinweberei AG. In late September, 1944, the Nazi regime established a sub-camp of Auschwitz in the factory where about 400 women, mostly Jews from Hungary, were forced to work on the spinning machines. The factory was known as and was directed by SS-Oberscharführer Bernhard Becker with twenty additional members of the SS. The subcamp was shut down on 19 January 1945 and the women there were forced to march by foot to the Gross-Rosen concentration camp. From there they were then taken to the Bergen-Belsen concentration camp; it is unknown who among them survived.

After World War II, the factory underwent reconstruction in 1949. A long period of recovery began for the company, which was then located in Poland. The company was named "Frotex" in 1965. In 1992, "Frotex" modernized the spinning mill and dyeing plant and opened a purification plant. "Frotex" was transformed into a State Treasury Company during that same year. In 1995, "Frotex" was added to the General Privatization Program and included in the Second National Investment Fund. In 2002, board members of the Second National Investment Fund decided to sell the majority (72% of shares) of their shares in the company.

"Frotex" ceased operations on 5 July 2014. In 2016, the American company Henniges Automotive opened its manufacturing unit in the building previously occupied by "Frotex".

== CEOs and presidents ==
- Samuel Fränkel (1845–1881)
- Joseph Pinkus (1881–1909)
- Max Pinkus (1909–1925)
- Hans Pinkus (1925–1938)
- Bolesław Pohl (?–1990)
- Josel Czerniak (1990–2001)
- Bogdan Stanach (2001–2002)
- Stanisław Wedler (2002–2006)
- Jarosław Staniec (2006–2007)
- Piotr Połulich (2007–2009)
- Andrzej Dudziński (2009–2010)

== Employment by year ==
- 1863 – 1 900
- 1890 – 1 029
- 1906 – 3 700
- 1913 – 4 000
- 1920 – 4 000
- 1938 – 2 000
- 1939 – 1 500
- 1944 – 1 900
- 1945 – 1 861
- 1958 – 2 500
- 1962 – 3 850
- 1965 – 4 000
- 1990 – 1 500
- 2002 – 800
- 2004 – 700
- 2005 – 650
- 2007 – 580
- 2008 – 550
- 2009 – 285
- 2010 – 200
- 2011 – 165
