= Federal Correctional Institution, Terminal Island =

Low-security prison in California, US

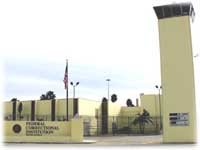
- Interactive map of Federal Correctional Institution, Terminal Island
- Location: Los Angeles, California; 33.7279°N 118.2675°W
- Status: Closed
- Security class: Low-security
- Population: 0
- Opened: June 1, 1938
- Closed: June 13, 2026
- Managed by: Federal Bureau of Prisons
- Director: William Marshall
- Warden: James Engelman

The Federal Correctional Institution, Terminal Island (FCI Terminal Island) was a United States federal prison for male inmates in Los Angeles, California. It was operated by the Federal Bureau of Prisons, a division of the United States Department of Justice.

FCI Terminal Island was located at the entrance to Los Angeles Harbor, between San Pedro and Long Beach.

== History ==
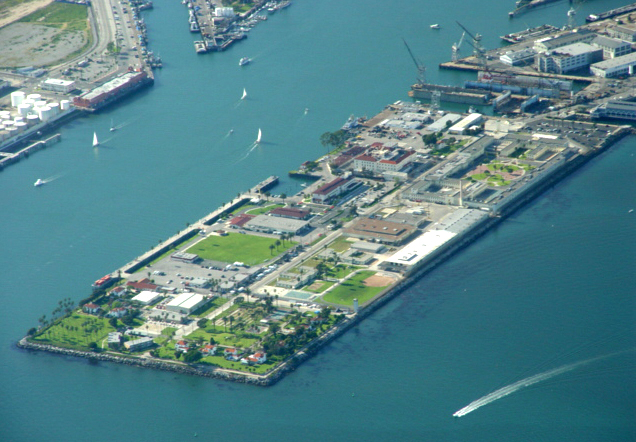
Aerial photograph of Reservation Point on Terminal Island, with the prison in the top right, above the Coast Guard base

The prison was opened at the southern end of Terminal Island, adjacent to a Coast Guard base, on June 1, 1938, with 610 male, and 40 female prisoners. It consisted of a central quadrangle surrounded by three cell blocks and cost $2 million to construct. In 1942, the U.S. Navy took control of the prison for use as a receiving station and later as a barracks for court-martialed prisoners. The facility was deactivated by the Navy in 1950 and later turned over to the state of California for use as a medical and psychiatric institution.

The state returned control to the U.S. Bureau of Prisons in 1955 for conversion into a low-to-medium security federal prison. The prison was mixed-sex, with female prisoners housed separately, until 1977, when overcrowding led to the transfer of the women to the federal prison in Dublin, California. The prison was given increased barbed wire and armed guards in the early 1980s in an effort to dispel the facility's "Club Fed" image. A corruption scandal rocked the prison in the early 1980s, resulting in the indictment of six employees on charges of bribes, cover-ups, marijuana sales to inmates, and other corruption. Those indicted included Charles DeSordi, the prison's chief investigator of crimes, the highest-ranking federal prison official ever to be indicted.

=== Notable inmates (prior to 1982) ===
† Inmates released prior to 1982 are not listed on the Federal Bureau of Prisons website.

| Inmate Name | Register Number | Photo | Status | Details |
|---|---|---|---|---|
| Qian Xuesen | Unlisted† | | Held at Terminal Island in 1950 (Pre-FCI) on suspicion of Communist sympathies. Name spelled Hsue-Shen Tsien. | Chinese-born rocket scientist. Arrested September 1950 and held for two weeks at Terminal Island, released under government supervision. Left the U.S. in 1955 for China; made important contributions to Chinese nuclear, missile, and space programs. |
| Liz Renay | Unlisted† | | Held at FCI Terminal Island from 1959 to 1961 on a perjury charge. | Girlfriend of Los Angeles mob kingpin Mickey Cohen. Convicted of perjury in 1959 and served 27 months at Terminal Island. |
| Salvatore Bonanno | Unlisted† | | Held at FCI Terminal Island from 1968 to 1972 on a credit card fraud conviction. | Consigliere for the Bonanno crime family in New York City in the 1960s and son of former boss Joseph Bonanno. |
| Edward Bunker | Unlisted† | | Held at FCI Terminal Island from 1973 to 1975. | Crime fiction writer, screenwriter and actor; wrote No Beast So Fierce while incarcerated at FCI Terminal Island, which was adapted into the movie Straight Time starring Dustin Hoffman. Later appeared in several movies, including Reservoir Dogs. |
| Al Capone | Unlisted† | | Held at FCI Terminal Island from 1939 to 1940. | Leader of the crime syndicate later known as the Chicago Outfit, which smuggled and bootlegged liquor during Prohibition in the 1920s; convicted of tax evasion in 1931. |
| Bernard Garrett | Unlisted† | | Held at FCI Terminal Island in the 1960s. | Businessman and banker; portrayed by Anthony Mackie in the 2020 Film The Banker. |
| Henry Hill | Unlisted† | | Held at FCI Terminal Island in the 1970s. | Former associate of the Lucchese crime family in New York City; portrayed by Ray Liotta in the 1990 film Goodfellas. |
| Timothy Leary | Unlisted† | | Held at FCI Terminal Island in 1974. | Harvard lecturer and LSD guru; convicted in 1970 of a prior prison escape and marijuana possession. |
| Charles Manson | Unlisted† | | Held at FCI Terminal Island from 1956 to 1958 for car theft and check fraud. He returned in 1966 and part of 1967 while serving out a sentence for attempting to cash a forged U.S. Treasury check. | Later served a life sentence for murder at Corcoran State Prison; inspired the book Helter Skelter in murdering Sharon Tate and others in 1969; died in 2017. |
| Anita O'Day | Unlisted† | | Held at FCI Terminal Island in 1954 on a conviction for heroin possession. | Acclaimed jazz singer during the swing era in the 1930s and 1940s. |
| Mike Rizzitello | Unlisted† | | Held at FCI Terminal Island for nine months in 1987; for violating his parole for associating with organized crime affiliates. | Caporegime in the Los Angeles crime family from 1977-1990. |
| Rosario Gambino | Unlisted | | Held at FCI Terminal Island to serve a 45-year sentence for selling heroin to an undercover police officer in 1984 | A soldier of the Cherry Hill Gambinos; a crew in the Gambino crime family. |
| The Port Chicago 50 | Unlisted† | | Held at FCI Terminal Island from November 1944 to January 1946. | 50 African-American sailors convicted of mutiny for refusing to load ammunition onto US Navy ships under unsafe conditions after the Port Chicago disaster, an explosion that killed 320 people, including 202 black sailors. |
| Flora Purim | 2775 | | Held at FCI Terminal Island in 1976. | Brazilian jazz singer at height of career during the mid-70s; convicted c. 1975 of cocaine possession. |
| Owsley Stanley | Unlisted† | | Held at FCI Terminal Island from 1970 to 1972. | Famous LSD chemist, counterculture figure and Grateful Dead sound engineer. Sent to Terminal Island after a judge revoked an earlier release because of a second drug bust. |

=== Notable inmates (since 1982) ===
| Inmate Name | Register Number | Photo | Status | Details |
|---|---|---|---|---|
| Ramesh Balwani | 24966-111 | | Scheduled for release in 2034. | Balwani, former COO of Theranos, was found guilty in July 2022 on all 12 charges he faced, which included ten counts of federal wire fraud and two counts of conspiracy to commit wire fraud. He was sentenced to nearly 13 years in prison. |
| Mouli Cohen | 57613-112 | | Serving a 22-year sentence; scheduled for release in 2028. Currently in the custody of RRM Long Beach. | Internet music entrepreneur; convicted in 2011 of wire fraud, money laundering and tax evasion for defrauding celebrities, investors, and a charity dedicated to help the poor of more than $31 million; the story was featured on the CNBC television show American Greed. |
| Eric McDavid | 16209-097 | | Released from custody in 2015; served 10 years. | Member of the ecoterrorist group Earth Liberation Front; convicted in 2007 of conspiring to destroy a northern California dam, a genetics lab, cell phone towers, and other targets. |
| Anthony Elgindy | 55479-198 | | Released from custody in 2013; served 8 years. | Former stockbroker; convicted in 2006 of racketeering conspiracy, securities fraud, wire fraud, and extortion for using information supplied by a corrupt FBI agent to spread negative publicity about companies through his Web site. |
| Brian O'Dea | 20293-086 | | Transferred to a Canadian prison in 1992 after serving one year. | Major drug trafficker in Canada and author of the book High: Confessions of a Pot Smuggler. |
| Michael Avenatti | 86743-054 | | Serving a 19-year sentence, scheduled for release in 2036 | Convicted in New York of attempting to extort Nike and honest services fraud related to his client; also facing two other pending trials relating to tax evasion, filing false tax returns and allegations of defrauding clients including Stormy Daniels. |
| Anthony Parnes | 87015-012 | | Held at FCI Terminal Island from 1987 until his extradition to Great Britain in 1988. | British stockbroker who committed a multimillion-dollar fraud against the Guinness liquor company known as the Guinness Affair. |
| Michael Riconosciuto | 21309-086 | | Released from custody in 2017; served 26 years. | Computer expert; convicted in 1992 of conspiracy to produce and distribute methamphetamine. |
| Robert Gilbeau | 56978-298 | | Released from custody in 2018; served over 1 year. | First active-duty admiral ever to be convicted of a felony. Lied to investigators about relationship with "Fat" Leonard Glenn Francis and pocketed $40,000 in kickbacks. |
| John Peter Galanis | 14097-054 | | Serving a 10-year sentence; scheduled for release in 2024. Currently in the custody of RRM Long Beach. | Sentenced for defrauding a Native American tribal entity and investment advisory clients of tens of millions of dollars in a bond scam. |
| Chad Andrew Carter | 26259-111 | | Serving a 42-month sentence; release in 2023. | Charged in 2020 for showing child pornography in a Zoom meeting. |
| Michael Franzese | 09699-016 | | 10 year sentence for racketeering. Released in 1994. | Former New York mobster and caporegime of the Colombo crime family, and son of former underboss Sonny Franzese. |
| Damian Kutzner | 68436-112 | | Released from custody on July 27, 2022; served 5 years. | Mortgage fraud. |
| Christian Secor | 30223-509 | | 42-month sentence, scheduled for release in 2025. | Former UCLA student who participated in the Jan. 6 Capitol Breach and sat in the chair recently vacated by former Vice President Mike Pence. |
| Robert Lemke | 27309-509 | | 36-month sentence. Released on August 17, 2023. | Former United States Air Force Captain who attended the January 6th, 2021 "Stop the Steal" rally in Washington, D.C. and United States Capitol Protest, protesting the 2020 election results, in which Donald Trump, Lemke and others denied the election legitimacy. Lemke was subsequently sentenced to 36-months, more than double his Federal Sentencing Guidelines, for threatening various members of Congress and members of the media, including Hakeem Jeffries, Brian Stetler and Don Lemon. |
| Sam Bankman Fried | 37244-510 | | Serving a 25-year sentence. | Found guilty of wire fraud and conspiracy in connection with the collapse of cryptocurrency exchange FTX and hedge fund Alameda Research. Sentence on March 28, 2024 included order to forfeit $11 billion. |
| Thomas Vincent Girardi | 43156-510 | | Serving an 87-month sentence. | Former trial lawyer, known for high-profile personal injury and mass tort cases, including litigation involving environmental contamination and corporate wrongdoing. Found guilty of wire fraud and embezzling tens of millions from his clients. |

== Facility and services ==
All inmates are expected to maintain a regular job assignment, unless medically exempted. Many job assignments are controlled through a performance pay system, which provides monetary payment for work. UNICOR has a separate pay scale. Institutional maintenance jobs are usually the first assignment for new inmates. These might include assignments to Food Service, as a unit orderly, or in a maintenance shop. However, a significant number of inmate jobs are available in the Federal Prison Industries. There is a waiting list for factory employment.

UNICOR employs and trains inmates through the operation of, and earnings from, the metal factory that produces high-quality metal products for the Federal government. Inmates must obtain a GED for grade advancement and must participate in the Financial Responsibility Program (if required) to be employed in UNICOR. Federal Prison Industries, a U.S. government employment program, has a shop at FCI Terminal Island that specializes in repairing, refurbishing, and reconditioning furniture, office equipment, tires, and other government property.

== Education ==
College courses are offered through Coastline Community College.

== See also ==
- List of United States federal prisons
- Federal Bureau of Prisons
- Incarceration in the United States
