= Poverty in the Democratic Republic of the Congo =

Overview of poverty in the Democratic Republic of Congo

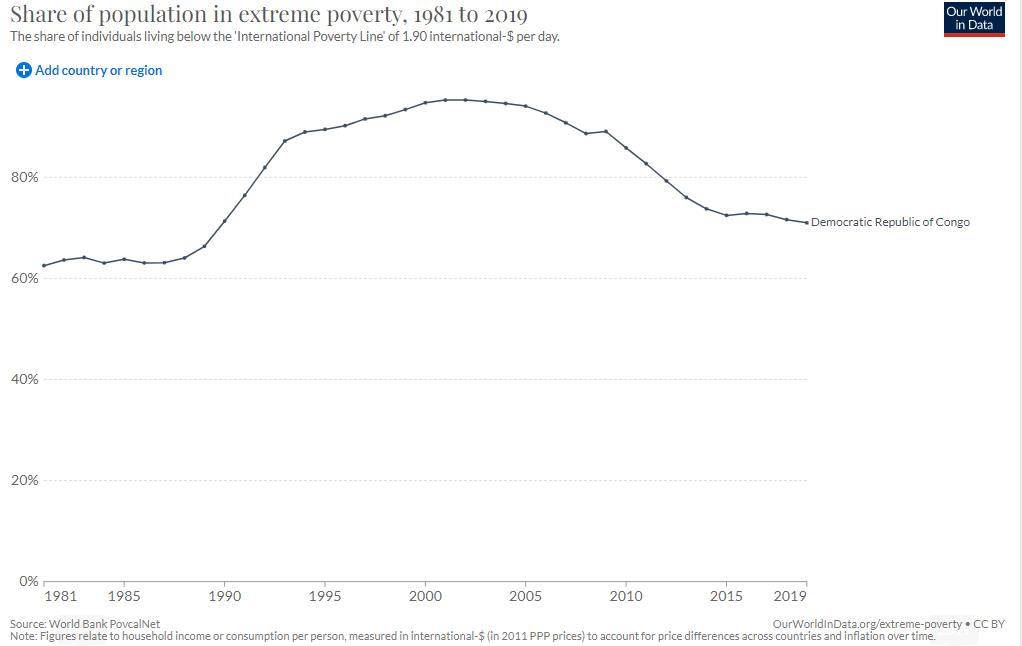
Share of population in extreme poverty over time, 1981 to 2019

Poverty is widespread and unchecked across the 26 provinces of the Democratic Republic of the Congo. Despite being the second-largest country in Africa, with an approximate area of 2.3 million square kilometres (890,000 sq mi), and being endowed with rich natural resources, the DRC is the tenth-poorest country in the world. The average annual income is only $449 US dollars. In 2019, the United Nations (UN) Human Development Index (HDI) ranked the DRC as the 175th least-developed country out of 189 countries with an HDI of 0.480. In 2023, almost 75% of Congolese people live on less than $2.15 a day, defined as the threshold for extreme poverty. (Note: A 2005 nationwide survey found a poverty rate of 71.3%. However, the national poverty criterion is less strict than the international definition of extreme poverty. According to a World Bank estimate, in 2023 74.6% of Congolese residents were living on less than $2.15 (2017 PPP) a day.)

== Causes ==
=== Instability ===
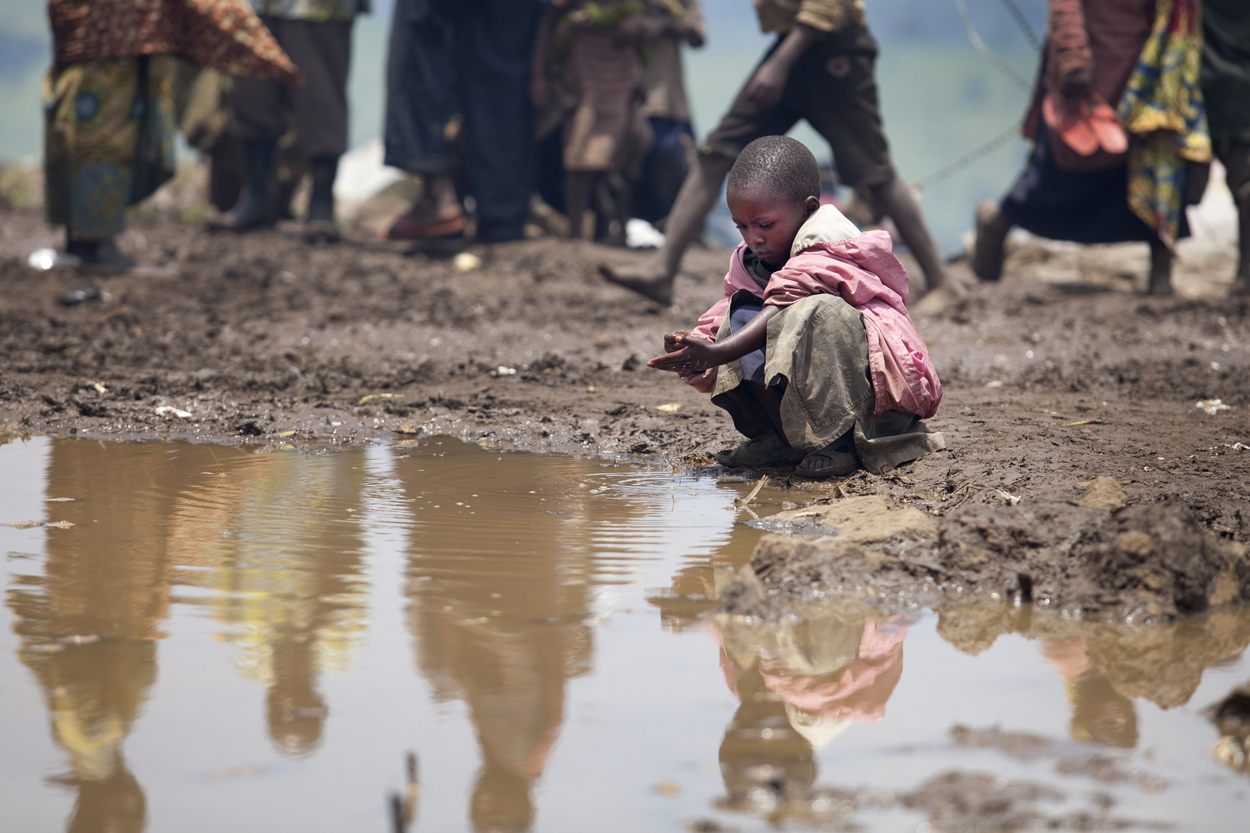
A small girl washes her hands in a puddle near MONUSCO base in Kitshanga after heavy fighting broke between APCLS and FARDC, it is estimated that 5000 peoples were displaced and at least 90 were killed, 7 March 2013.

Instability from years of wars and political upheaval is one of the most significant causes of poverty in the Democratic Republic of the Congo (DRC), while poverty and youth unemployment has ignited conflicts. The DRC is home to raw mineral ores worth an estimated US$24 trillion, which has been the driving force for one of the worlds most devastating conflicts since World War II. The war over raw materials in the Congo kills an estimated 10,000 civilians a month. The precious metals mined in the Congo are used in the manufacturing of smartphones, lightbulbs, computers, and jewelry. The corruption in the mining industry has become a lucrative trade for militia groups who, before 2010, generated yearly revenues estimated around $185 million indirectly from foreign investors. Although the passage of the Dodd–Frank Act in the US substantially reduced the market for illegal minerals, and the majority of mines are now under civilian control, militia groups continue to fund themselves from gold mining. Foreign companies investing in the armed groups that control mineral resources has resulted in the loss of over $1 billion in tax revenue. In addition, the Congolese government's awarding of mining assets to foreign countries at one-sixth their value have cost the Congolese people about $1.35 billion.

The DRC was very poor before the most recent outbreak of civil war in the 1990s. According to the United Nations Economic Commission for Africa, the data is sparse, but nevertheless it has concluded that "[a]rmed conflicts have caused a deterioration in living standards in most of the provinces". Households in war-torn areas spend less money per person for daily expenses than those in peaceful areas, a sign that the war has negatively affected their economic conditions.

=== Diseases ===
Disease is another central cause of poverty in the DRC. Major diseases such as cholera, hepatitis A, malaria, polio, measles and typhoid fever continue to run rampant. HIV/AIDS affects 1.2% of the Congolese. In the DRC, Malaria is the primary cause of morbidity and mortality. The DRC has the second-highest number of reported cases of Malaria worldwide. Children are especially susceptible to malaria, and the disease is responsible for the deaths of 19% of children under the age of five. Tuberculosis is another leading cause of death. Infectious diseases have reduced the life expectancy of the Congolese to only 48 years, while one in seven children dies before the age of five.

=== Hunger ===
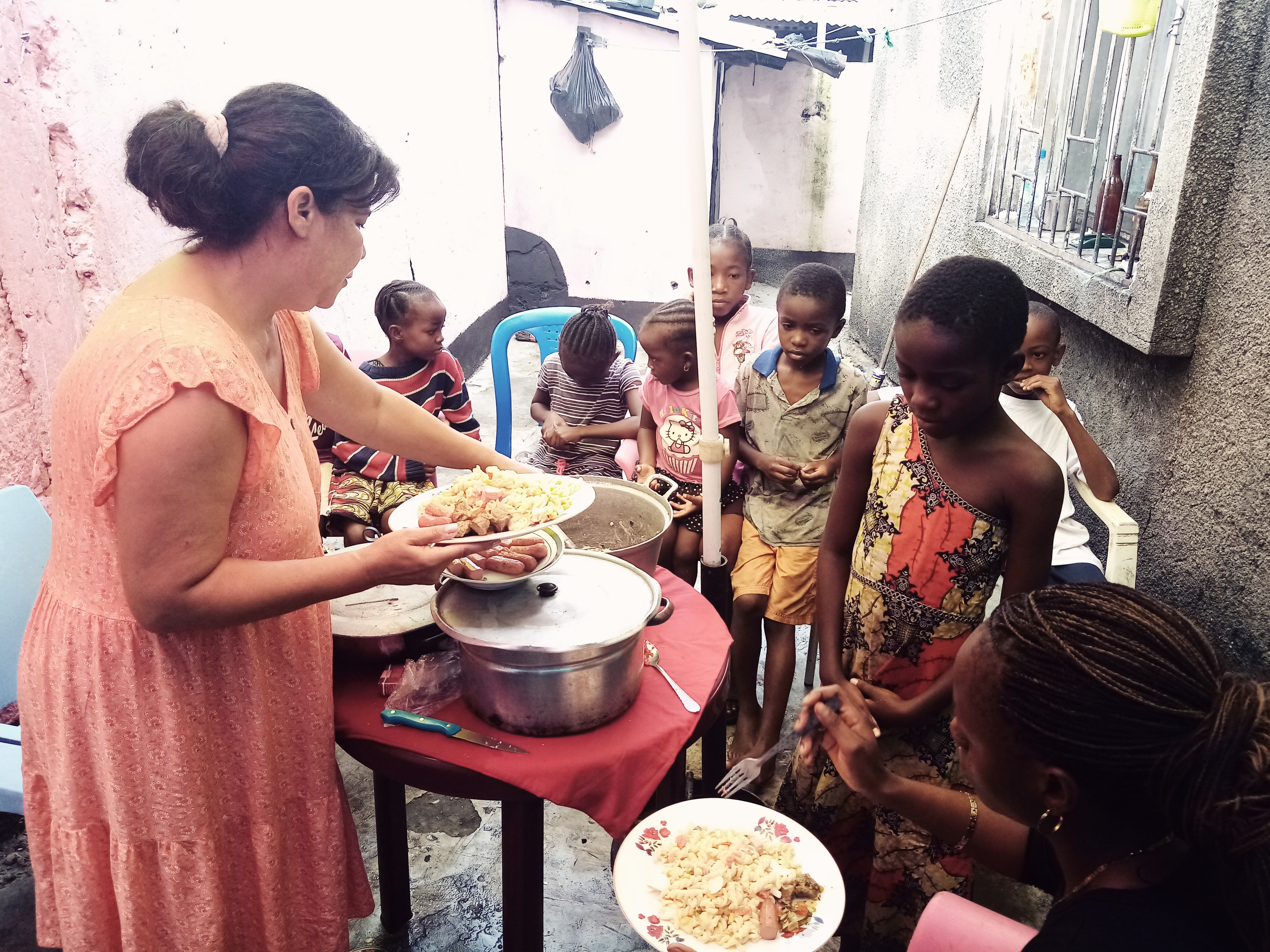
Orphanage in DRC

According to the Food Security Portal, nearly 70 percent of the DRC population have little to no access to an adequate food supply contributing to the malnourishment of one out of every four children. Malnutrition in children is especially high in war-torn provinces that rely on the mining industry. The principal contributing factor to food shortages is population displacement. Due to the ongoing violence the United Nations estimates that approximately 2.3 million persons are displaced in the DRC. The conflicts in mining provinces have disrupted harvesting activities resulting in three million people being at risk of starvation. In March 2025, according to the UN, on the IPC scale 3.9 million are classified as Phase 4 “emergency” levels of hunger and 23.8 million are classified as Phase 3 “crisis” levels.

=== Water ===
Water shortages also play an integral role in severe food shortages. The lack of infrastructure in rural areas, as well as the collapse of infrastructure due to fighting, have left the majority of the Congolese without access to clean water sources. The DRC holds over half of the water reserves in Africa, and yet, in 2011, three-quarters of the population had no access to safe drinking water.

== See also ==
- Economy of the Democratic Republic of the Congo
- Water crisis in the Democratic Republic of the Congo
- Mining industry of the Democratic Republic of the Congo
