= Max Pinkus =

German industrialist and bibliophile

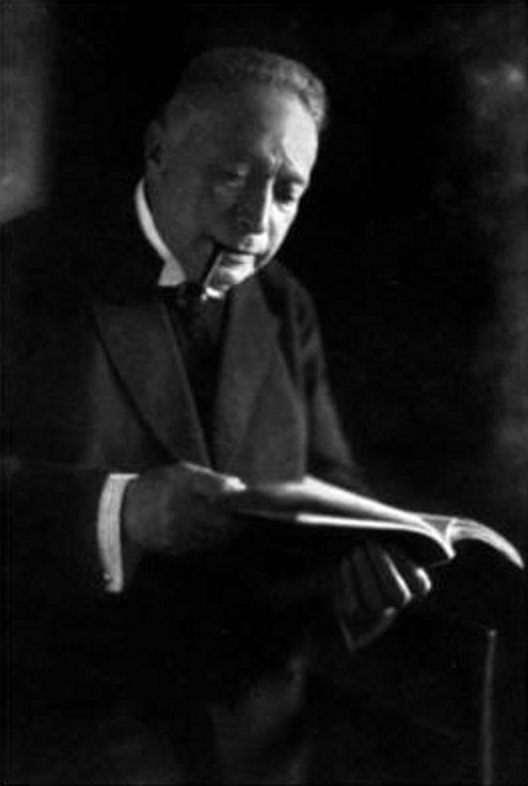
- Born: 3 December 1857; Neustadt O/S
- Died: 19 June 1934 (aged 76); Neustadt O/S
- Occupations: Industrialist, bibliophile

Max Pinkus (3 December 1857 – 19 June 1934) was a German industrialist and a bibliophile.

== Life ==
Max Pinkus was born 3 December 1857 in Neustadt O.S. (currently Prudnik, Poland). He was a son of industrialist Joseph Pinkus and Augusta Fränkel. After his father's death, he became an owner of S. Fränkel Feinweberei, post-1945 nationalised by Poland as ZPB "Frotex". He studied weaving in Lyon. He also studied in the United Kingdom and the United States. He married Hedwig Oberländer on 13 May 1888. They had two sons, Hans Hubert and Klaus Valentin and one daughter, Alice Babette. He died 19 June 1934 in his library. His library was confiscated by the Nazis and dispersed to several locations. It is believed that the core of the library is locked away in the National Library in Moscow. Parts of his extensive collection of Silesian arts and crafts which have been discovered in German museums are in the process of being restored to his decedents whilst those in Poland are not being offered back.
