= CMOC Group Limited =

Chinese mining company

CMOC 洛阳钼业
- Type: Public; partly state-owned
- Traded as: SSE: 603993; SEHK: 3993; CSI A50
- Industry: Metal and Phosphate mining
- Founded: 1969; 57 years ago
- Headquarters: Luanchuan, Luoyang, Henan, People's Republic of China
- Area served: Worldwide
- Key people: Peng Xuhui (CEO); Liu Jianfeng (Chairman)
- Products: Copper, Molybdenum, Tungsten, Cobalt, Niobium and Phosphate related products
- Revenue: ▼CN¥206.70 billion (2025)
- Operating income: ▼CN¥20.84 billion (2025)
- Net income: ▲CN¥20.34 billion (2025)
- Owner: Cathay Fortune (30.19%); CATL (24.68%)
- Subsidiaries: IXM
- Website: en.cmoc.com

CMOC or CMOC Group Limited (simplified Chinese: 洛阳钼业; traditional Chinese: 洛陽鉬業; pinyin: Luòyáng mù yè; lit. 'Luoyang Molybdenum Industries'), previously known as China Molybdenum Company Limited, is a Chinese mining company and one of the world's largest producers of molybdenum, tungsten, niobium, cobalt, and copper. The company accounts for approximately one-third of global cobalt supply.

CMOC's headquarters are located in Luanchuan County, close to the city of Luoyang City in Henan. CMOC is listed on the Hong Kong Stock Exchange and Shanghai Stock Exchange, with state-owned entities holding a minority stake.

== History ==
The original company was founded as a wholly state-owned enterprise in 1969 under Luoyang Luanchuan Molybdenum, with the Sandaozhuang mine being established the next year. By the early 2000s, Luoyang Luanchuan was researching ways to extract Scheelite from its main molybdenum mine. Together with Ximen Tungsten Co Ltd, it founded a joint venture, Luoyang Yulu Mining Co. Ltd. to process the ore.

In August 2006, the company began planning an initial public offering, and, in preparation for the move, changed its name to China Molybdenum in 2007. The company is listed on the Hong Kong Stock Exchange.

In 2010, CMOC acquired 55% of the Shangfanggou mine from the Luoyang Mining Group by buying 50% of Xuzhou Huanyu Molybdenum Co., Ltd and 100% of Luanchuan Huqi Mining Company Limited. The Hong Kong Stock Exchange sanctioned the group for not publicly disclosing the Huqi acquisition in a timely manner.

Shares were first offered on the Shanghai Stock Exchange in 2012. On September 20, CMOC reported raising 600 million yuan by selling shares, significantly less than the 3.65 billion yuan initially planned. The scope of the offering was cut back from initial plans due to intervention from the China Securities Regulatory Commission. However, the stock then performed well, quickly tripling in value.

In 2013, CMOC acquired an 80% stake in the Northparkes copper-gold mine in Australia from Rio Tinto. The company sold the entirety of its stake in Northparkes to Australian gold mining company Evolution Mining in December 2023.

A fully owned subsidiary, CMOC International, moved its headquarters to Phoenix, Arizona in 2017. The CEO of this international subsidiary, Kalidas Madhavpeddi, left the company in 2018.

In 2017, the Louis Dreyfus Company announced it was selling its metals trading business, LDC Metals, for $466 million to several Chinese companies, including CMOC and AXAM Asset Management. LDC Metals was then renamed IXM. CMOC took full control of IXM in 2019.

In June 2022, the company officially changed its name from China Molybdenum Company Limited to CMOC Group Limited. Later that year, the company was included at 74 on the Fortune China 500 list.

== Management and ownership ==
The current chairman of CMOC is Liu Jianfeng, having been elected in May 2025. He replaced Yuan Honglin, who resigned from the position in April 2025. CMOC's three largest shareholders are the Cathay Fortune Group, Chinese battery manufacturer CATL, and HKSCC Nominees Limited, which own a combined 66.03% stake in the company. The Luoyang Municipal People's Government also maintains an ownership stake in the company.

== Holdings and subsidiary ==
=== Holdings ===
==== Brazil ====
In 2016, CMOC acquired phosphate and niobium mines in the Brazilian states of Goiás and São Paulo from Anglo American plc, including the Boa Vista mine.

In 2026, CMOC acquired 100% interest in the Aurizona Mine, RDM Mine and Bahia Complex located in Brazil from Equinox Gold for US$1.015 billion.

==== China ====
In China, the company controls three major mines: the molybdenum-tungsten Sandaozhuang mine (Chinese: 三道莊鉬鎢礦), in Luanchuan County, the Donggebi molybdenum mine in Hami, and the molybdenum-iron Shangfanggou mine (Chinese: 上房溝鉬鐵礦), directly adjacent to the Sandaozhuang mine. The Sandaozhuang mine is owned fully by CMOC, while the Shangfanggou mine is a joint venture with 45% equity controlled by Luoyang Mining Group.

==== Democratic Republic of Congo ====
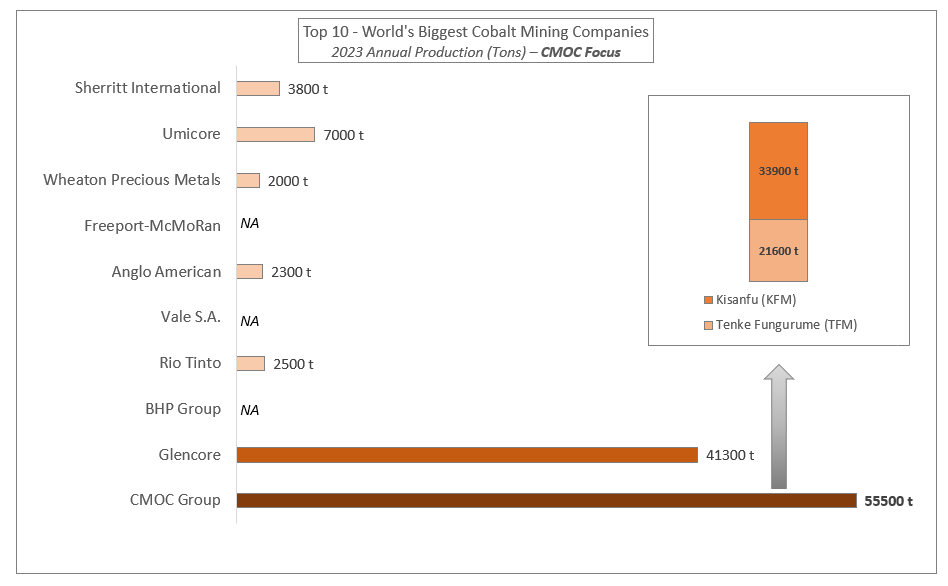
Top 10 world's biggest cobalt mining companies (2023), including TFM breakdown. Glencore Annual Report 2023.

In the Democratic Republic of Congo, the company holds an 80% stake in the Tenke Fungurume Mine. This mine was purchased from Freeport-McMoRan in 2016 for $2.65 billion, supported by at least $1.59 billion in loans from Chinese state-backed banks. The deal was facilitated by BHR Partners, which bought out Lundin Mining's minority stake in the mine for $1.14 billion. The mine holds copper, as well as cobalt for lithium-ion batteries. In 2022, the Tenke Fungurume mine became the subject of a dispute between CMOC and the DRC government over the amount of royalties paid to the mine's minority partner, Congolese state-owned company Gécamines. An agreement was reached in April 2023 that opened the way for the resumption of minerals exports.

Similarly, through its subsidiary KFM Holding Limited, the company also acquired a 95% stake in the Kisanfu mine from Freeport-McMoRan in 2020 for a price of $550 million, which also produces copper and cobalt. In 2021, the group sold 25% of KFM Holdings to Contemporary Amperex Technology for $137.5 million, leaving it with a 71.25% stake in the Kisanfu project. CMOC announced plans in July 2022 to invest $1.8 billion into the Kisanfu project.

==== Ecuador ====
In June 2025, CMOC acquired full ownership of the Cangrejos Gold Project, located in El Oro Province, Ecuador. In April 2026, CMOC, through its local subsidiary ODIN Mining del Ecuador SA, signed an agreement with the Government of Ecuador concerning the development of the Cangrejos gold deposit.

=== Subsidiary ===
==== IXM ====
In 2019, CMOC fully acquired IXM, currently the world's third-largest metals trader. The company specializes in the trade of copper, zinc, aluminium, nickel, cobalt, niobium and lithium. Its corporate headquarters is based in Geneva, Switzerland.

== See also ==
- Jinduicheng Molybdenum
- Tongling Nonferrous Metals
- Tenke Fungurume Mine
