= Tongling Nonferrous Metals =

Chinese state-owned smelting company

Tongling Nonferrous Metals Group Holding Company Limited 銅陵有色金屬集團控股有限公司
- Type: State-owned enterprise
- Industry: Metal mining
- Founded: 1949
- Headquarters: Tongling, Anhui, People's Republic of China
- Area served: People's Republic of China
- Key people: Chairman: Mr. Yang Jun
- Products: Nonferrous metals
- Subsidiaries: Tongling Nonferrous Metals Group Company Limited
- Website: www.tnmg.com.cn/

Tongling Nonferrous Metals Group Company Limited 銅陵有色金屬集團股份有限公司
- Type: State-owned enterprise
- Industry: Metal mining
- Founded: 1992
- Headquarters: Tongling, Anhui, People's Republic of China
- Area served: People's Republic of China
- Key people: Chairman: Mr. Yang Jun
- Products: Nonferrous metals
- Parent: Tongling Nonferrous Metals Group Holding Company Limited
- Website: Tongling Nonferrous Metals Group Company Limited

Tongling Nonferrous Metals Group Holding Company Limited is a state-owned enterprise involved in the extraction of copper resources and smelting of copper and other non-ferrous metals. It was founded in 1949 in Tongling, Anhui, China, and began production in 1952. It is one of the largest copper smelting companies in China.

The subsidiary and listed company of Tongling Nonferrous Metals Group Holdings Company Limited, Tongling Nonferrous Metals Group Company Limited, was established in 1992 and listed on the Shenzhen Stock Exchange in 1996 (SZSE: 000630).

== Mining operations ==
Notable projects include:

- Mirador Mine: The company holds a stake in the Mirador copper-gold open-pit mine in southeastern Ecuador, one of two mines in the country. The project is developed under a joint venture with CRCC-Tongguan Investment Co., Ltd., and has drawn international attention as one of China's major overseas mining investments.
- Shaxi Copper Mine: Located in Anhui Province, China, the Shaxi Copper Mine is a modern underground mine wholly controlled by Tongling. While primarily developed as a copper mine, it also produced an estimated 649,180 ounces of gold in 2023, making it the largest gold-producing mine in China by output.

== Complaints of competitors ==
At the end of February 2025, Glencore announced to interrupt operations at its smelter in Pasar (Philippines) and wrote that fees that smelters get to process copper had fallen to an all-time low.
