= Henniges Automotive =

American manufacturing company

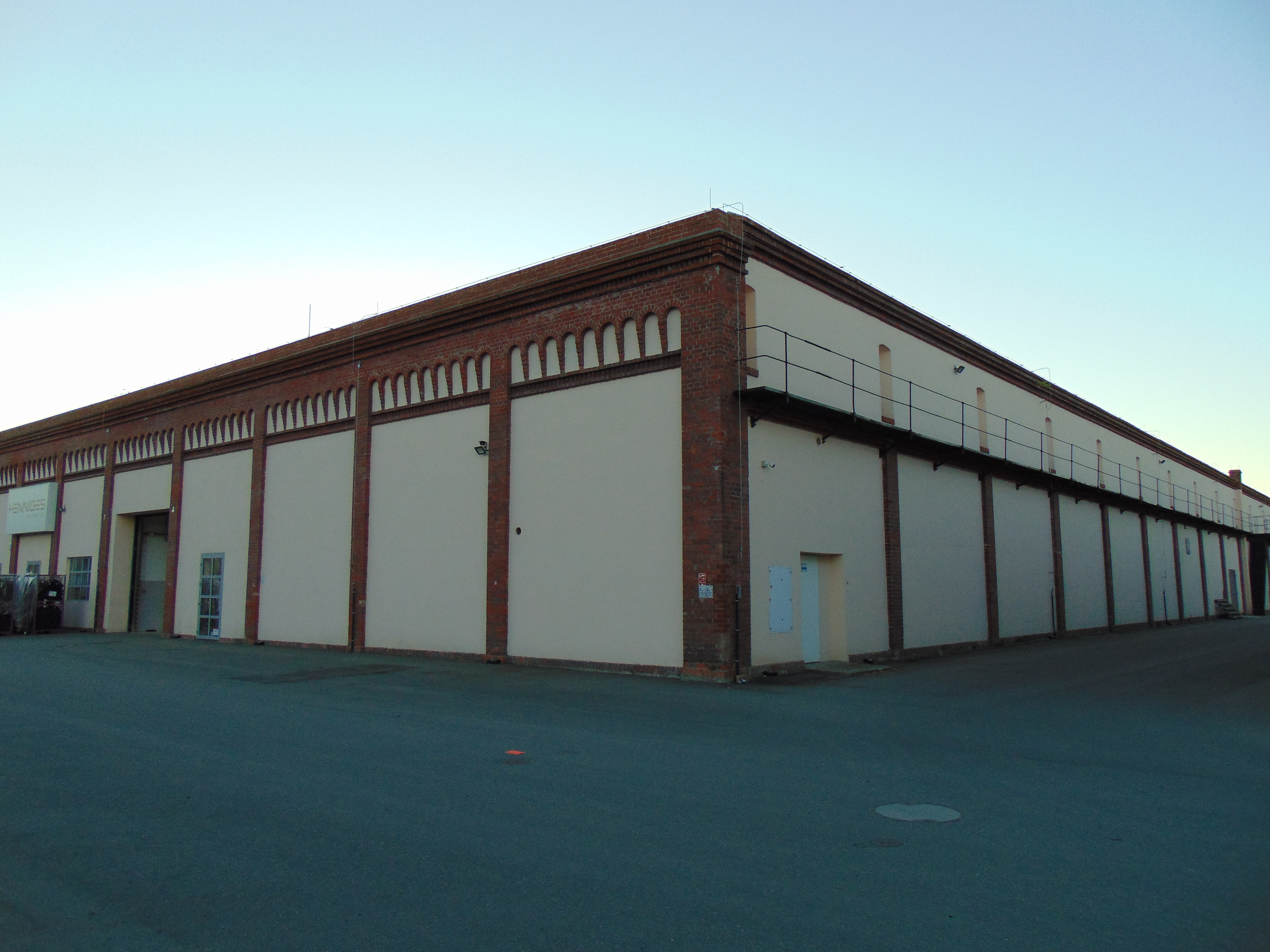
- Henniges Automotive in Prudnik
- Industry: Automotive
- Founded: 1863
- Headquarters: Auburn Hills, United States
- Owner: Larry Williams

Henniges Automotive, based in Auburn Hills, Michigan is a company producing anti-vibration components and encapsulated glass systems. The company was founded in 1863.

In 2015, Henniges Automotives was acquired by AVIC Automotive Systems Holding Co Ltd, a wholly owned subsidiary of China's state-owned aerospace and defence conglomerate Aviation Industry Corporation of China (AVIC). Henniges called the deal "one of the largest acquisitions by a Chinese company of a U.S.-based automotive manufacturing company in history."

In August 2019, Senate Finance Committee Chairman Chuck Grassley has called on the Treasury Department to investigate CFIUS's 2015 approval of AVIC's acquisition of Henniges, which, since the acquisition, has opened plants in Suzhou, China; Prudnik, Poland and a European headquarters in Mladá Boleslav, Czech Republic. The state-run AVIC was involved in stealing sensitive data regarding the Joint Strike Fighter program and later incorporated the stolen data into China's Chengdu J-20 and Shenyang FC-31 fighters.

== Locations ==
=== North America ===
==== United States ====
- Auburn Hills, Michigan
- Keokuk, Iowa
- New Haven, Missouri
- Reidsville, North Carolina
- Frederick, Oklahoma

==== Mexico ====
- Torreón
- Gómez Palacio, Durango
- Zapopan

=== Europe ===
==== Germany ====
- Viersen
- Rehburg-Loccum
- Munich

==== Poland ====
- Prudnik

==== Czech Republic ====
- Hranice
- Kosmonosy

=== Asia ===
==== China ====
- Changchun
- Tieling
- Beijing
- Taicang
- Chengdu
- Suzhou

=== South America ===
==== Brazil ====
- Jundiai

== See also ==
- Zakłady Przemysłu Bawełnianego "Frotex"
