= Tenke Fungurume Mine =

Mine in the Democratic Republic of the Congo

Tenke Fungurume Mining SA
- Location within Democratic Republic of the Congo
- Location: Lualaba Province, Democratic Republic of the Congo; 10°34′06″S 26°11′44″E
- Production: Copper: 209,120 tons (2021); Cobalt: 18,501 tons (2021)
- Opened: 2009
- Company: China Molybdenum (80%); Gécamines (20%)
- Website: en.cmoc.com/html/Business/Congo-Cu-Co/

Tenke Fungurume Mining SA (TFM) is one of the largest copper and cobalt producers in the Democratic Republic of Congo (DRC). Construction on the site began in the latter part of 2006, and in 2009, TFM produced its first copper. The mine has since become a vital source of income for local communities and the country by way of royalties and taxes, as well as the largest employer in the region.

As of 2018, Tenke Fungurume Mining has paid over US$2.5 billion in payments to the public treasury and other administrative services since project inception in 2006, and currently employs over 8,000 Congolese citizens as either employees or contractors on a full-time basis.

Tenke Fungurume Mining takes its name from the two neighbouring communities of Tenke and Fungurume.

== Location ==
TFM operations are located in Fungurume, within the province of Lualaba, approximately 180 km northwest of the city of Lubumbashi. The mining concession area is approximately 1,600 square kilometers.

== Ownership ==
Tenke Fungurume Mining SARL was initially drilled around 1900 by Union Miniere, then by state owned Gecamines, then an Anglo American joint venture in the 70s, then Adolph Lundin in the 90s, then Phelps Dodge of the U.S., with a 57.75% share and the Congolese companies Tenke Mining Corp. (24.75% share) and Gécamines (17.5% share).

=== 2007 Freeport 56% and Lundin 24% ===
Freeport-McMoRan Copper & Gold Inc. and Phelps Dodge Corp. merged on March 19, 2007. Freeport-McMoRan Copper & Gold Inc., which operated the mine and held 56 percent of the shares, and became the world's largest publicly traded copper company; Lundin Mining of Canada now held 24 percent; and the state-owned Gécamines 20 percent.

In 2008, an Environmental impact assessment was conducted, with a zero discharge tailings dam designed to prevent contamination.

=== 2016/2017 China Molybdenum 56% and BHR 24% ===
On May 9, 2016, Freeport-McMoRan announced its intention to sell its stake in the Tenke project to China Molybdenum Co. for $2.65 billion in cash, to help reduce its debt. The minority stakeholder in TF Holdings Limited, Lundin Mining, had a 90-day right of first refusal, which it extended multiple times as it considered its options.

In November 2016, on the deadline for when Lundin's right of first offer was set to expire, Freeport-McMoRan completed the indirect sale of its 70 percent interest in TF Holdings Limited to China Molybdenum Co. for $2.65 billion, representing an effective 56 percent interest in Tenke Fungurume Mining. In addition, Lundin announced an agreement to sell its interest in TFM to an affiliate of BHR Partners, and waived its right to acquire Freeport-McMoRan's stake. In 2017, BHR Newwood DRC Holdings was set up by private equity firm BHR to acquire a 24% interest in Tenke from Canadian miner Lundin for $1.14 billion. 100% of the purchase funds were supplied by the Chinese state-backed companies.

The deal was strongly supported by prime minister Matata Ponyo Mapon in 2016, who praised China Molybdenum as a "solid partner". On the other hand, the deal was initially opposed by the state owned Gécamines, which filed a lawsuit in international courts to block both acquisitions, but dropped its objections in January 2017 after reaching an agreement for $100 million in compensation and additional control over future sales of equity in the mine.

=== 2019 China Molybdenum 80% ===
BHR sold its stake in the mine to China Molybdenum 2019 for $1.14 billion, at which time Hunter Biden owned 10% of BHR. This acquisition of the holding company meant that China Molybdenum Co, which was already the majority owner of Tenke Fungurume, then ended up with an 80% stake in Tenke Fungurume Mining.

== Mine operations ==
Tenke Fungurume Mining SA is a large copper and cobalt producer, with mines and processing facilities situated within the African copper belt in the Democratic Republic of the Congo. Tenke's substantial mineral endowment supports a long mine life and future expansion opportunities.

Tenke Fungurume Mining SA is also home to one of the world's largest known copper and cobalt deposits, and is the largest copper producer in the DRC.

Through the production of copper cathode and cobalt hydroxide, TFM provides metals crucial to the transportation, communications, construction, computers, medical science and many emerging technologies. TFM produced its first copper cathode in 2009.

China Molybdenum stated in 2019 that the fall in cobalt prices and rising costs made the mine unprofitable.

During the COVID-19 pandemic in early 2020, workers at the mine were ordered to remain onsite in order to isolate themselves from outside contact. After working for two months in isolation, workers went on strike on May 23, demanding an additional $100 per day and a $4,000 bonus. Production resumed after a single day strike after China Molybdenum agreed to the $100 per day in extra pay and a $300 bonus.

In August 2021, China Molybdenum announced a US$2.51 billion investment in order to double production of cobalt and copper at the mine. Shortly after, the Congolese government announced a probe to assess whether China Molybdenum was accurately reporting the reserves present at the mine. Due to the dispute, in February 2022, operations at the mine were handed over to Sage Ngoie Mbayo, an administrator from Gécamines for six months. Operations were handed back to China Molybdenum by April 2022, after both parties agreed to settle the matter by third party arbitration. On June 1, a judge ordered that the previous decision to hand over of the mine to Ngoie be enforced, but China Molybdenum denies that control of the mine has actually changed hands. At a June 16 meeting in Lubumbashi, Gécamines executives claimed China Molybdenum owed as much as $5 billion, and threatened to block exports from the mine, or even to revoke China Molybdenum's ownership of the mine. The court-appointed administrator ordered exports to be suspended, with logistics companies given notice on July 16 that exports from the mine were suspended until at least July 24.

== Illicit mining ==
Residents of the nearby town of Tenke are known to trespass into the mine to collect cobalt, which increased after the mine's change in ownership. Unable to prevent this, China Molybdenum brought in the Congolese military to patrol the mine for several months. After one trespassing miner was shot, a riot broke out in his village, leading to a second death. Funeral costs from these incidents were covered by the mining company. Security at the mine is supplemented by the private security company Frontier Services Group associated with Erik Prince.

== See also ==
- Copper mining in the Democratic Republic of the Congo
- Freeport-McMoRan
- Lundin Mining
- Phelps Dodge
