= Hunter Biden laptop controversy =

US political controversy

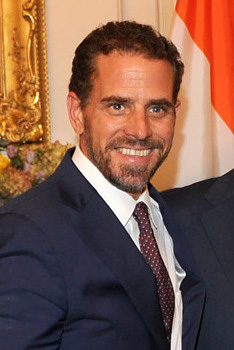
Hunter Biden in 2014

In October 2020, a controversy arose involving a laptop that belonged to Hunter Biden. The owner of a Delaware computer shop, John Paul Mac Isaac, said that the laptop had been left by a man who identified himself as Hunter Biden. Three weeks before the 2020 United States presidential election, the New York Post published a front-page story that presented emails from the laptop, alleging they showed corruption by Joe Biden, the Democratic presidential nominee and Hunter Biden's father. According to the Post, the story was based on information provided to Rudy Giuliani, the personal attorney of incumbent president and Republican candidate Donald Trump, by Mac Isaac. Forensic analysis later authenticated some of the emails from the laptop, including both emails used by the Post in their initial reporting.

Shortly after the Post story broke, social media companies blocked links to it, while other news outlets declined to publish the story due to concerns about provenance and suspicions of Russian disinformation. On October 19, 2020, an open letter signed by 51 former US intelligence officials warned that the laptop "has all the classic earmarks of a Russian information operation." By May 2023, no evidence had publicly surfaced to support suspicions that the laptop was part of a Russian disinformation scheme.

In December 2019, under the authority of a subpoena issued by a Wilmington grand jury, the Federal Bureau of Investigation (FBI) seized the laptop from Mac Isaac. FBI investigators handling Hunter Biden's laptop quickly concluded in 2019 "that the laptop was genuinely his and did not seem to have been tampered with or manipulated". In June 2024, federal prosecutors utilized the laptop as evidence as part of a criminal case against Hunter Biden, alongside testimony from an FBI agent involved in authenticating and investigating the laptop.

The hard drive data had been shared with Trump advisor Steve Bannon before it became publicly known. Trump attempted to turn the story into an October surprise to hurt Joe Biden's campaign by falsely alleging that, while in office, Biden had acted corruptly regarding Ukraine to protect his son. A joint investigation by two Republican Senate committees released in September 2020 and a Republican House Oversight committee investigation released in April 2024 did not find wrongdoing by Joe Biden with regard to Ukraine and his son's business dealings there.

== Background ==
The media coverage of the laptop spurred speculation about the Biden–Ukraine conspiracy theory, which falsely alleged that then vice president Joe Biden acted in Ukraine to protect his son from a corruption investigation by Ukrainian Prosecutor General Viktor Shokin. On October 14, 2020, the New York Post published an article based on an email from the laptop about a purported meeting between then vice president Joe Biden and the Burisma advisor Vadym Pozharskyi. The Biden campaign denied Joe Biden had any meeting with Pozharskyi and said that if they had ever met, it would have been a brief encounter. Witnesses at the dinner where they allegedly met said Joe Biden briefly passed by to see an old friend. The Post reported in its story that Pozharskyi declined to comment, and he did not comment to a Politico journalist who reported extensively on the story a year later.

The Post reported that the email was found in a cache of data extracted from the external hard drive of a laptop computer that belonged to Hunter Biden. The Post reported that the repair shop owner had made a copy of the external hard drive before it was seized by the US Federal Bureau of Investigation (FBI) and that the copy was later provided to the Post by Donald Trump's attorney, Rudy Giuliani. The subpoena to seize the laptop was issued by a grand jury on behalf of the US attorney's office in Wilmington, which was later reported to have been investigating Hunter Biden about lobbying and financial matters since at least 2018.

The veracity of the Post's reporting was strongly questioned by many mainstream media outlets and analysts due to the initially unclear origin and chain of custody of the laptop and the provenance of its contents. Due to prior Russian influence campaigns during the 2016 election, particularly the release of documents obtained by Russian cyber attacks targeting John Podesta and the Democratic National Committee, media outlets and intelligence officials also became suspicious of a possible disinformation campaign by Russian intelligence or its proxies. Analysts also suspected Russian involvement in the 2017 leaks of emails involving French president Emmanuel Macron two days before national elections, which contained fake emails mingled with genuine ones. Adding to concerns, Giuliani had met with Andrii Derkach, later confirmed to be a Russian agent, while conducting opposition research against Joe Biden in Ukraine in 2019.

== New York Post reporting ==
On October 14, 2020, the New York Post published articles containing purported emails of unknown authorship which suggested that Hunter Biden provided an "opportunity" to Vadym Pozharskyi, an advisor to the board of Burisma, to meet his father, then-Vice President Joe Biden. Joe Biden stated in September 2019 that he had never spoken to his son about his foreign business dealings. His presidential campaign denied such a meeting took place and stated the New York Post had never contacted them "about the critical elements of this story". Michael Carpenter, Vice President Biden's foreign policy adviser in 2015, told The Washington Post that he had accompanied Joe Biden during all of his meetings about Ukraine: "He never met with [Pozharskyi]. In fact, I had never heard of this guy until the New York Post story broke." One of the purported emails showed Pozharskyi saying he would share information with Amos Hochstein, a State Department advisor close to Vice President Biden, though Hochstein stated, "The Republican Senate investigation subpoenaed all my records, including emails and calendars and found no mention of this man. I led the US energy efforts in Ukraine and never even heard of him before yesterday."

According to an investigation by The New York Times, editors at the New York Post "pressed staff members to add their bylines to the story", and at least one refused, in addition to the original author, reportedly because of a lack of confidence in its credibility. Of the two writers eventually credited on the article, the second did not know her name was attached to it until after The Post published it. In its opening sentence, the New York Post story misleadingly asserted, "the elder Biden pressured government officials in Ukraine into firing a prosecutor who was investigating" Burisma, even though Shokin had not pursued an investigation into Burisma's founder. The opening sentence also misleadingly stated that Hunter Biden introduced his father to Pozharskyi, but the purported email from Pozharskyi only mentioned an invitation and "opportunity" for the men to meet.

On October 15, the Post published another article regarding a business venture relating to CEFC China Energy that Hunter Biden was negotiating with potential investment partners in May 2017, when his father was a private citizen. The Post published a purported email it said came from the laptop, written by one of the prospective investors, on which Hunter Biden was copied. The email described the proposed equity shares of each of the investors in the venture, ending with a reference to "10 held by H for the big guy?" The Post reported the "H" apparently referred to Hunter Biden, and one of his former business partners soon came forward to assert "the big guy" referred to Joe Biden. The former business partner also tweeted a copy of the email addressed to him. In a subsequent email, Hunter Biden said his "Chairman" gave him "an emphatic no", with a later email identifying the "chairman" as his father. The Post also reported on an August 2017 venture Hunter Biden was seeking with Ye Jianming, the chairman of CEFC, but the paper did not associate Joe Biden with that deal. Neither of the two ventures came to fruition.

On May 26, 2021, the New York Post published another article focused on purported emails, suggesting that Joe Biden had met with Vadym Pozharskyi at a dinner in Cafe Milano in Washington. The Washington Post investigated the April 16, 2015, dinner. According to dinner attendee Rick Leach, who like Hunter Biden was one of the leaders of the World Food Program USA fundraising organization, the discussions at the dinner were about food security, not "politics or business". Leach said that Joe Biden briefly dropped by the dinner to meet Alex Karloutsos. According to Leach, Joe Biden "didn't even sit down. He was not part of the dinner or part of the dinner discussion." Karloutsos, a longtime friend of Joe Biden, had an influential role in the Greek Orthodox Church that Joe Biden long worked with. Karloutsos corroborated Leach's account. Also, according to The Washington Post, the tentative guest list for the dinner included the name "Vadym" with no surname listed.

=== Laptop and hard drive ===
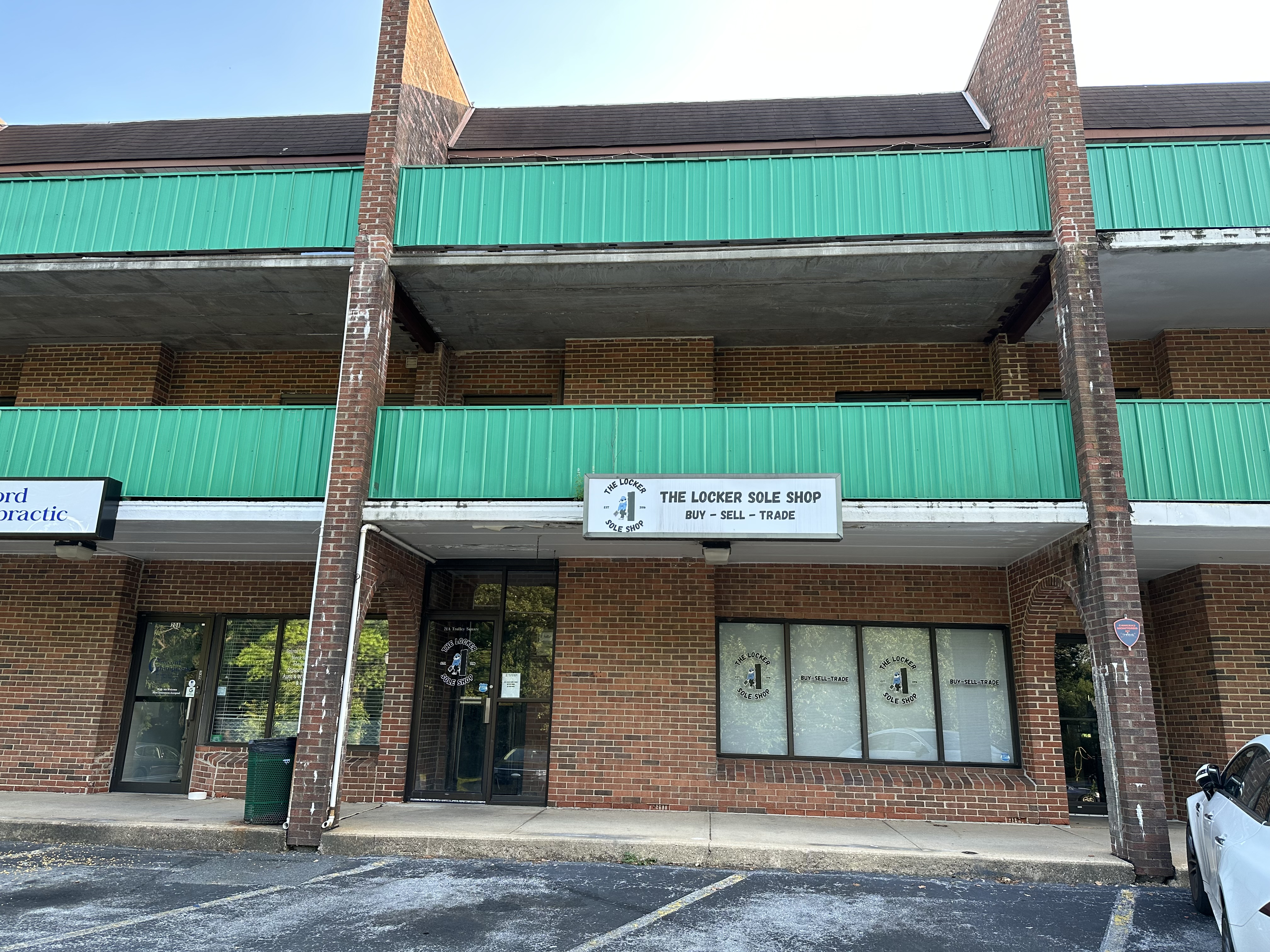
A 2023 photo of 21A Trolley Square, on the northeast side of the Trolley Square mall in Wilmington, Delaware, which was once the location for the computer repair business, The Mac Shop

Rudy Giuliani provided the materials to the New York Post after they were allegedly found on a water-damaged MacBook Pro left at The Mac Shop, a Wilmington, Delaware, computer repair business owned by John Paul Mac Isaac. Mac Isaac obtained the laptop in April 2019, claiming it had been dropped off by a man who identified himself as Hunter Biden and requested that the data on the damaged laptop be recovered. Mac Isaac also said that he is legally blind and could not be sure if the person who supposedly left the laptop was actually Hunter Biden.

Mac Isaac eventually brought the laptop to the attention of the FBI, who seized it in December 2019, under the authority of a subpoena issued by a Wilmington grand jury that had been investigating Hunter Biden for financial matters since 2018. He asserted three years later that while he was copying individual files and folders from the laptop's hard drive to another device, he "saw some content that was disturbing and then also raised some red flags", including "criminality ... related to foreign business dealings, to potential money laundering and, more importantly, national security issues and concerns". This caused him "to do a deep dive into the laptop once it became my property". Mac Isaac contacted Giuliani, who he said was his "lifeguard"—voicing credence to the conspiracy theory that the Hillary Clinton 2016 presidential campaign was behind the murder of campaign worker Seth Rich. Steve Bannon informed the New York Post of the laptop, and he and Giuliani delivered a copy of the supposed laptop hard drive to the publication. Weeks before, on September 28, Bannon had stated on Dutch television that he had Hunter Biden's hard drive, though this footage was not released until after the New York Post story released.

Giuliani was later quoted as saying he had given the copy to the New York Post because "either nobody else would take it, or if they took it, they would spend all the time they could to try to contradict it before they put it out". According to the New York Post story, a person—who Mac Isaac could not identify because he is legally blind—left the computer at the repair shop to repair water damage, but once this was completed, the shop had no contact information for its owner, and nobody ever paid for it or came to pick it up. Criticism focused on Mac Isaac over inconsistencies in his accounts of how the laptop came into his possession and how he passed it on to Giuliani and the FBI. When interviewed by CBS News, Mac Isaac offered contradictory statements about his motivations. Thomas Rid, a political scientist and disinformation expert at Johns Hopkins University, noted that the emails could have been forged or that forged material could have been mixed with genuine materials, a "common feature" of disinformation operations. The Daily Beast reported that according to two "individuals with direct knowledge", multiple senior officials in the Trump administration and re-election campaign were aware of the laptop hard drive "several weeks" prior to the New York Post story. Giuliani later confirmed to The Daily Beast that he had informed Trump about the material before the New York Post story.

The New York Post reported it had been shown an image purporting to show a federal subpoena that resulted in the computer and an external hard drive being seized by the FBI in December 2019. NBC News reported the FBI had acquired the devices via a grand jury subpoena, though it was unclear if this was the subpoena cited by the New York Post, and was investigating whether the contents were linked to a foreign intelligence operation. The Associated Press confirmed the existence of the FBI investigation into possible foreign-intelligence activity. Citing a "US official and a congressional source briefed on the matter", CNN reported the FBI was specifically investigating possible connections to ongoing Russian disinformation efforts against Joe Biden. In 2022, Mark Zuckerberg stated that an FBI warning about a possible Russian disinformation campaign prompted Facebook to remove content purporting to convey facts concerning the laptop story.

According to The Washington Post, Mac Isaac was alarmed that the laptop was not mentioned during Trump's first impeachment trial in early 2020.

PolitiFact wrote in June 2021: "Over time, there has been less doubt that the laptop did in fact belong to Hunter Biden", concluding that the laptop "was real in the sense that it exists, but it didn't prove much", as "Nothing from the laptop has revealed illegal or unethical behavior by Joe Biden as vice president with regard to his son's tenure as a director for Burisma". PolitiFact states that it is possible that "copies of a laptop" were obtained, instead of the actual laptop. PolitiFact states that the Daily Mail published nude photos of Hunter Biden from the laptop, as well as other content focused on Hunter Biden's drug use and legal issues, but notes that Hunter Biden had already publicized his drug issues.

=== Ukraine material ===
Material similar to the alleged hard-drive contents was reportedly circulating in Ukraine in 2019. One individual interviewed by Time magazine stated that he had been approached in late May 2019, and a second person stated that he had been approached in mid-September. According to the second individual, the seller wished to sell compromising information about Hunter Biden to Republican Party allies of Donald Trump for $5 million. "I walked away from it, because it smelled awful", he told Time. Igor Novikov, a former advisor to the Ukrainian president and a disinformation researcher, said that the market for kompromat (damaging material) had been very active in the past year in reaction to political events in the United States, with political operatives rushing to respond to Giuliani's call for damaging information on the Bidens. Novikov characterized the materials available on the market as "extremely hard to verify, yet very easy to fake".

Ukrainian legislator Andrii Derkach, an active Russian agent, worked with Giuliani in Ukraine to damage Biden. Derkach said Giuliani was "very useful for me". They met during multiple meetings leading up to the 2020 election. Derkach attempted to shift blame for election interference in the 2020 election from Russia to Ukraine, and claimed that Ukraine was trying to get Biden elected. On October 19, 2020, Derkach posted on social media that he had a second Hunter Biden laptop: "The facts confirming international corruption are stored on a second laptop. These are not the last witnesses or the last laptop." Derkach was later sanctioned by the United States Treasury Department for his involvement in disinformation about Joe Biden; the Treasury concluded Derkach had been an active Russian intelligence agent for over a decade; the Security Service of Ukraine (SBU) have also said that Derkach received funds from the Russian GRU, and initiated an investigation into his role.

Lev Parnas told Politico that Giuliani had been told about compromising material regarding Hunter Biden on May 30, 2019, during a visit with Vitaly Pruss. Pruss was an associate of Burisma founder Mykola Zlochevsky, who was then being investigated for corruption by Ukraine.

=== Hunter Biden story pitch ===
Earlier in October, before the Post's report, White House lawyer Eric Herschmann, former deputy White House counsel Stefan Passantino, former Hunter Biden business partner Tony Bobulinski, and close Donald Trump Jr. associate Arthur Schwartz pitched a story about Hunter Biden's business dealings in China to The Wall Street Journal, which the Trump team saw as an ideal outlet due to its combination of conservatism and industry credibility. Without warning to the Trump team and while the Journal was exercising due diligence in investigating the story, the New York Post went ahead and published a version of the story based on documents and emails with "questionable provenance" that alleged, but did not prove, Joe Biden's involvement in his son's affairs.

Bannon had anticipated the Journal story would appear on October 19, and Trump told reporters to expect a major story in the Journal. Bobulinski thought it would not run the piece, so he issued his own statement on October 21, which Breitbart News published unedited. During the next day's presidential debate, Trump vaguely referred to the emails and Bobulinski was his special guest. Afterward, the Journal published a brief story saying corporate records it reviewed "show no role for Joe Biden".

=== Aftermath and veracity concerns ===
The New York Times reported in May 2021 that federal investigators in Brooklyn had begun a criminal investigation late in the Trump administration into possible efforts by several current and former Ukrainian officials to spread unsubstantiated allegations about Joe Biden concerning corruption. The investigators had been examining whether the Ukrainians used Giuliani as a channel for the allegations, though he was not a specific subject of the investigation, in contrast to a long-running investigation of Giuliani by the US attorney's office in Manhattan.

The New York Times reported in March 2022 that they found emails "from a cache of files that appears to have come from a laptop abandoned by Mr. Biden in a Delaware repair shop".

In March 2022, Vox reported that no evidence had ever emerged "that the laptop's leak was a Russian plot". That month, The New York Times reported that sources familiar with the emails and an investigation of Hunter Biden related to possible financial impropriety said some emails between Hunter Biden, his business partner and others regarding Burisma and other foreign business activity had been authenticated. Emails showed Hunter Biden and his business partner discussed inviting foreign business associates to the April 2015 dinner in Washington, including Pozharskyi.

In April 2022, The Washington Post reported that Mac Isaac said that he had seen claims about what the laptop contained that did not reflect what he had seen on the laptop: "I do know that there have been multiple attempts over the past year-and-a-half to insert questionable material into the laptop as in, not physically, but passing off this misinformation or disinformation as coming from the laptop. And that is a major concern of mine because I have fought tooth and nail to protect the integrity of this drive and to jeopardize that is going to mean that everything that I sacrificed will be for nothing."

In May 2022, NBC News published an analysis of a copy of the hard drive they received from Giuliani and documents released by Republicans on two Senate committees. The analysis found that Hunter Biden's firm took in $11 million from 2013 to 2018 and spent the money quickly. The analysis also found that few of Hunter Biden's deals ever came to fruition.

Classified materials were found in the home and former office of president Joe Biden in late 2022 and early 2023. Following this development, some Republicans and conservative commentators sought to cite materials found on the laptop to suggest improper activity by the Bidens, relating to classified information and possible corruption. In one case, an email from the laptop that Hunter Biden apparently sent to his business partner as they prepared to work for Burisma in April 2014 came under the scrutiny of Fox News, and senators Ron Johnson and Ted Cruz. In their view, the email contents of geopolitical analysis read as though it contained information from classified sources. Glenn Kessler, a Washington Post fact checker, found the email content to be a close match with contemporaneous newspaper and magazine reporting.

In another case, in January 2023 an anonymous Twitter account posted a rental application found on the laptop, leading to a false claim that in 2018 Hunter Biden had paid $49,910 in monthly rent for his father's Delaware residence where classified documents had been found. The false allegation quickly spread across conservative media. A Breitbart story that speculated Hunter Biden may have had access to classified documents in his father's home was retweeted by House Republican Conference chair Elise Stefanik who added that "Joe Biden and the Biden Crime Family are corrupt and significant threats to national security. Our Republican House Majority will hold them accountable." James Comer, chair of the House Oversight Committee that was investigating the Biden family, suggested it was evidence that Hunter Biden may have been funneling foreign money to his father. The document actually showed quarterly rental payments for office space at the House of Sweden in Washington, D.C. On his Fox News program, host Tucker Carlson echoed Comer's false suggestion of Hunter Biden malfeasance; days later Hunter Biden's attorneys wrote Carlson and Fox News demanding they correct the falsehood on-air or risk a defamation lawsuit.

== Forensic analysis ==
In March 2022, The Washington Post published the findings of two forensic information analysts it had retained to examine 217 gigabytes of data provided to the paper on a hard drive by Republican activist Jack Maxey, who represented that its contents came from the laptop. One of the analysts characterized the data as a "disaster" from a forensics standpoint. The analysts found that people other than Hunter Biden had repeatedly accessed and copied data for nearly three years; they also found evidence that people other than Hunter Biden had accessed and written files to the drive, both before and after the New York Post story. In September 2020, someone created six new folders on the drive, including some with the names "Biden Burisma", "Big Guy File", "Salacious Pics Package" and "Hunter. Burisma Documents". One of the analysts found evidence someone may have accessed the drive contents from a West Coast location days after The New York Post published their stories about the laptop.

Using cryptographic signatures, one analyst verified that 1,828 of the roughly 129,000 emails on the drive came from the indicated email accounts of origin, suggesting they were authentic and had not been tampered with. The other analysis verified nearly 22,000 emails using similar methods, after overcoming technical issues the first analysis could not resolve. The analysts said emails from Burisma, where Pozharskyi was an advisor, were likely authentic but cautioned that if Burisma had been hacked, it would be possible for hackers to use stolen cryptographic signatures to forge emails that would pass as authentic. The New York Times reported in January 2020 that Russian military intelligence had hacked Burisma beginning in November 2019; a co-founder of the firm that discovered the hacking said Russians were stealing email credentials. Both analysts acknowledged that cryptographic signatures are not a perfect way to authenticate emails, as some email services do not implement the technology as rigorously as others. About 16,000 of the 22,000 emails carrying cryptographic signatures came via Google, which rigorously implements the technology. The analysts noted that cryptographic signatures can only verify that an email originated from a certain email account, but not who controlled that account; there are other means for hackers to commandeer email accounts. According to the Washington Post, "Some other emails on the drive that have been the foundation for previous news reports could not be verified because the messages lacked verifiable cryptographic signatures."

Among the emails that The Washington Post was able to authenticate was the Pozharskyi email that formed the basis of the New York Post's original article. An email referencing "10 held by H for the big guy?", a possible reference to a rejected proposal to give Joe Biden a 10% share of a Chinese deal his son was negotiating, was not authenticated, though a recipient of the email publicly vouched for its authenticity.

One of the analysts found that timestamps on documents and operating system indexes matched, though he noted hackers could forge timestamps in undetectable ways. The analysts also noted that repeated access to the drive resulted in logs and other files used by forensic analysts to examine system activity being deleted. Neither analyst found evidence emails or other files had been manipulated by hackers, nor could they rule out that possibility.

In reference to a cache of emails allegedly coming from the Hunter Biden Laptop, Matt Tait, a former information security specialist for the GCHQ (UK's Government Communications Headquarters), told CyberScoop, "it is clear the cache isn't in its original form".

In November 2022, CBS News published the results of a forensic analysis they commissioned of a copy of the laptop data Mac Isaac initially handed to federal investigators in 2019. The analysis, conducted by Computer Forensics Services, found data, including over 120,000 emails, "consistent with normal, everyday use of a computer", found "no evidence that the user data had been modified, fabricated or tampered with", and found no new files created on the laptop after April 2019, when Mac Isaac received the laptop. The chief technology officer of Computer Forensics Services added: "I have no doubt in my mind that this data was created by Hunter Biden, and that it came from a computer under Mr. Biden's control". Also on November 21, CBS News published the first photograph of the damaged MacBook Pro, which had been provided to them by Hunter Biden's legal team.

According to reports on January 16, 2024, new filings by the U.S. Department of Justice's special counsel, headed by David C. Weiss, appear to be the first public confirmation of the laptop's authenticity by the DOJ. The filings refer to the laptop connected to Hunter Biden stating, "the defendant's Apple MacBook Pro, which he had left at a computer store."

== Lawsuits ==
=== Lawsuits from Mac Isaac ===
In December 2020, Mac Isaac sued Twitter for defamation over their handling of the New York Post story, claiming that their decision to remove the article under their "hacked materials" policy falsely tarred him as a hacker. The case was dismissed within a day of its filing based on jurisdictional grounds. Mac Isaac then filed a second suit against the company. Florida district judge Beth Bloom dismissed the second lawsuit with prejudice in September 2021, noting that Twitter never mentioned Mac Isaac or his business, and ordered Mac Isaac to pay Twitter's attorney fees under Florida's anti-SLAPP statute.

In May 2022, Mac Isaac again sued a number of individuals and publications for defamation, alleging that he had suffered reputational damage over claims that the laptop story had been part of a Russian disinformation campaign and that he had illegally accessed the data on the laptop. The suit named Hunter Biden, Democratic representative Adam Schiff, and the news publications CNN, Politico, and The Daily Beast. Schiff stated in an October 2020 interview with Wolf Blitzer in CNN that "Well we know that this whole smear on Joe Biden comes from the Kremlin. That's been clear for well over a year now that they've been pushing this false narrative about the Vice President and his son." In March 2023, Hunter Biden countersued Mac Isaac, responding to his defamation suit and alleging that Mac Isaac had invaded his privacy and had no legal right to copy and distribute his private information. The suit lists six counts of invasion of privacy by Mac Isaac and others, and seeks a jury trial to determine compensatory and punitive damages. On September 30, 2024, Delaware Superior Court Judge Robert Robinson Jr. dismissed both Mac Isaac's defamation claims, and Biden's counterclaims. One of Mac Isaac's lawyers said that he planned to appeal the decision.

=== Lawsuits from Hunter Biden ===
In September 2023, Hunter Biden filed a civil lawsuit against Giuliani, his companies and attorney Robert Costello, alleging that they had spent years "hacking into, tampering with, manipulating, copying, disseminating, and generally obsessing over data that they were given that was taken or stolen from" his personal devices and caused "total annihilation" of his digital privacy. Biden agreed to drop the lawsuit in June 2024.

In September 2023, Hunter Biden sued activist and former Trump staffer Garrett Ziegler for allegedly violating privacy laws through distributing Biden's data related to the laptop. Biden had previously referred Ziegler to federal and state investigators for alleged crimes. In March 2025, Biden moved to dismiss the lawsuit as he did not have the funds to continue the legal proceedings. Following this, Judge Hernán Vera dismissed the suit with prejudice.

== Trial on gun charges ==
In June 2024, special counsel Weiss introduced the laptop, related files, and an invoice from Mac Isaac's repair shop as evidence in Biden's trial in Delaware, in which he was found guilty of purchasing a firearm while a recent drug user. Defense attorneys for Biden argued that they had "numerous reasons to believe the data had been altered and compromised before investigators obtained the electronic material", which Weiss described as "a conspiracy theory with no supporting evidence". Prosecutors stated that defense attorneys had not "provided any evidence or information that shows that his laptop contains false information". The presiding judge sided with prosecutors.

On June 4, 2024, the laptop was introduced into evidence by the prosecution. An FBI witness testified that the FBI had Biden's original laptop. She further testified about Biden's texts, his 2021 autobiography which detailed his drug addiction, and his bank records. (Note: .)

== Reactions ==
=== Hunter Biden ===
During an April 2021 interview with CBS correspondent Tracy Smith, when asked if the laptop was his, Hunter Biden replied that he did not know and did not remember dropping off a laptop in Delaware for repairs, adding: "There could be a laptop out there that was stolen from me. It could be that I was hacked. It could be that it was Russian intelligence. It could be that it was stolen from me."

In May 2021, Hunter enlisted the counsel of lawyer Kevin Morris to investigate the circumstances of the laptop's release to the press.

=== Intelligence officials ===
On October 19, 2020, a group of 51 former senior intelligence officials, who had served in the Trump administration and those of the three previous presidents, released an open letter stating that the release of the alleged emails "has all the classic earmarks of a Russian information operation", adding:

We want to emphasize that we do not know if the emails, provided to the New York Post by President Trump's personal attorney Rudy Giuliani, are genuine or not and that we do not have evidence of Russian involvement—just that our experience makes us deeply suspicious that the Russian government played a significant role in this case.

That night, Natasha Bertrand of Politico wrote a story about the letter, with the headline, "Hunter Biden story is Russian disinfo, dozens of former intel officials say." The rest of the story, however, was less definitive, with a subheading saying the former officials "signed a letter casting doubt on the provenance of a New York Post story," and noting in the story body that the letter said the information in the Post story "has all the classic earmarks of a Russian information operation." In a February 2023 analysis, Washington Post fact checker Glenn Kessler wrote "that headline likely shaped perceptions of the letter that continue to this day." Former director of national intelligence James Clapper, who signed the letter, told Kessler, "There was message distortion. All we were doing was raising a yellow flag that this could be Russian disinformation. Politico deliberately distorted what we said. It was clear in paragraph five" of the letter. Politico stood by their report in a statement to Kessler.

In the final presidential debate for 2020 and in an interview with 60 Minutes, Joe Biden referenced the letter from the intelligence officials. He inaccurately claimed the letter asserted that the laptop controversy was a "Russian plan", "a bunch of garbage", "disinformation from the Russians" and "a smear campaign".

During an interview with Fox News on October 19, 2020, National Intelligence Director John Ratcliffe said the laptop was "not part of some Russian disinformation campaign" and accused Adam Schiff of mischaracterizing the views of the intelligence community by describing the alleged emails as part of a smear campaign against Biden. Schiff's spokesman accused Ratcliffe of "purposefully misrepresenting" the US representative's words. Ratcliffe had previously made public assertions that contradicted professional intelligence assessments. Several security officials criticized Ratcliffe for appearing to pre-judge its outcome. The FBI said it had "nothing to add" to Ratcliffe's remarks in response to a request for more information made by Sen. Ron Johnson. The New York Times reported days after the Post story that no solid evidence had emerged that the laptop contained Russian disinformation.

On January 20, 2025, Donald Trump issued an executive order revoking the security clearances of all the officials who signed the letter. The executive order states "The signatories willfully weaponized the gravitas of the Intelligence Community to manipulate the political process and undermine our democratic institutions". Lawyers including Mark Zaid and Dan Meyer said that the revocation can be challenged in court.

=== Social media corporations ===
After the 2016 election, social media companies were criticized for allowing false political information to proliferate on their platforms, including disinformation from Russian intelligence, suggesting it may have assisted Trump's election.

In October 2020, both Twitter and Facebook implemented measures on their platforms to prevent sharing of the New York Post article. Twitter first deprecated the story (prevented its algorithm from highlighting it due to its popularity) but eventually banned links to the story from being posted. It did so according to its Hacked Materials Policy and Facebook per a policy that "in many countries, including in the US, if we have signals that a piece of content is false, we temporarily reduce its distribution pending review by a third-party fact-checker".

Facebook's decision had been informed by an FBI warning to watch for disinformation spread by foreign actors. The Hill reported on the Facebook action, "it is unclear what 'signals' triggered the limit on the New York Post article". Twitter briefly locked Trump's presidential campaign Twitter account for sharing a controversial Hunter Biden video earlier on October 15. The account was unlocked later that day. Between October 14 and 23, the original New York Post story received over 54 million Facebook views.

Commentators from varied political backgrounds criticized the actions taken by Facebook and Twitter, arguing that they could have amplified disinformation thanks to the Streisand effect. Twitter CEO Jack Dorsey added: "Our communication around our actions on the @nypost article was not great. And blocking URL sharing via tweet or DM with zero context as to why we're blocking: unacceptable."

On October 14, Trump tweeted about Facebook and Twitter's actions, including a threat to repeal the safe harbor provisions of Section 230 of the Communications Decency Act, under which they operate.

Congressional Republicans on the Senate Judiciary Committee called on Facebook CEO Mark Zuckerberg and Twitter CEO Jack Dorsey to testify before the committee in response to their platforms' actions. Senators Ted Cruz, Lindsey Graham, and Josh Hawley announced that the committee would vote on subpoenaing Dorsey to appear on October 23. Senate Majority Leader Mitch McConnell described the restrictions made by Facebook and Twitter as "absolutely reprehensible" and stated that the companies were acting as "speech police".

Dorsey said: "Straight blocking of URLs was wrong, and we updated our policy and enforcement to fix. Our goal is to attempt to add context, and now we have capabilities to do that." In March 2021, Dorsey told Congress: "It was literally just a process error. This was not against them [the Post] in any particular way." Facebook also said that it was restricting spread pending input from third-party fact-checkers. Associated Press noted that the story had, as of October 17, 2020, "not been confirmed by other publications". In an August 2022 Mark Zuckerberg interview on the Joe Rogan podcast, Zuckerberg said that Facebook thought the story fit the pattern of Russian propaganda and called it a "hyper-political issue". Zuckerberg also said that the FBI had previously told Facebook to be aware of potential propaganda about the 2020 presidential election and was told by them that "there's about to be some kind of dump". When the New York Post story was published, Facebook thought that it "fit that pattern" the FBI told Facebook about. In October 2022, The Intercept reported that records filed in federal court as part of a lawsuit revealed that two FBI agents were involved in communications with Facebook that allegedly "led to Facebook's suppression" of the New York Post story, although The Intercept also noted that the lawsuit has a "partisan slant". Biden administration attorneys responded by saying that the plaintiffs related to the lawsuit lacked standing and that social media companies pursued content moderation policies on their own without "coercive" influence from the US government.

The New York Times reported in September 2021 that a Federal Election Commission inquiry into a complaint about Twitter's exclusion of the article had dismissed the complaint, saying the social media company had legitimate commercial reasons for its actions and that it could not be determined that Twitter had acted on purely political grounds.

Ross Douthat pointed out similarities between social media reactions to the Hunter-Biden-laptop-and-emails situation and the Steele dossier. He did not see the New York Post story as Russian disinformation but "a more normal example of late-dropping opposition research, filtered through a partisan lens and a tabloid sensibility, weaving genuine facts into contestable conclusions. It was, in other words, analogous to all kinds of contested anti-Trump stories that various media outlets have run with across the last four crazy years—from the publicity around the Steele dossier's wilder rumors to the tales of Michael Cohen's supposed Prague rendezvous to the claims that Russians hacked Vermont's power grid or even C-SPAN."

Ben Smith, who felt that social media should have treated the laptop and dossier stories in the same way, described how he published the dossier for BuzzFeed News in 2017 when he saw that media gatekeepers were "keeping [the dossier] from their audience". He saw the media's refusal to cover the laptop as a "revenge of the gatekeepers".

The Hunter Biden laptop story resulted in increased scrutiny of Twitter's and Facebook's actions in supposedly limiting the dissemination of the story by conservatives; in an editorial, conservative news outlet The Washington Examiner wrote: "What is needed, not just on the laptop story but in general, is a major course correction by Big Tech. These companies need more humility about their own biases and their lack of expertise in distinguishing truth from fiction."

In December 2022, Twitter owner Elon Musk gave several writers access to internal company documents from October 2020 that showed Twitter executives' discussion of its content moderation relating to the Post story. Musk and others asserted Twitter had been ordered by the government to help Joe Biden in the coming election by suppressing the Post laptop story.

Journalist Matt Taibbi, one of those given access for the Twitter Files examination, found no evidence of government involvement in Twitter's decision to initially withhold the story. (Note: .) Taibbi wrote:

22. Although several sources recalled hearing about a 'general' warning from federal law enforcement that summer about possible foreign hacks, there's no evidence—that I've seen—of any government involvement in the laptop story. In fact, that might have been the problem...

Republican House members Jim Jordan and James Comer launched complementary investigations in January 2023. Former Twitter employees and members of the Twitter Files team provided testimony. Both committees concluded their investigations in 2024.

In June 2024, the Supreme Court rejected claims that the government unlawfully coerced social media companies into removing posts related to the laptop in Murthy v. Missouri. Justice Amy Coney Barrett, in her majority opinion, wrote that while government agencies "played a role" in moderation choices, social media companies had acted independently to strengthen moderation policies prior to any government involvement. Justice Barrett stated that there was a lack of evidence to demonstrate that content moderation decisions could be traced back to actions taken by the FBI or the Cybersecurity and Infrastructure Security Agency.

=== Joe Biden 2020 presidential campaign ===
The Joe Biden 2020 presidential campaign press secretary Jamal Brown stated that Twitter's action concerning the New York Post story indicated that the allegations in the story were false. Brown specifically denied that Joe Biden ever had a formal meeting with Pozharskyi, and said that if they had ever met, it would have been a brief encounter.

=== Congress ===
On January 21, 2021, the day after Biden's inauguration, Republican representative Marjorie Taylor Greene of Georgia filed an article of impeachment, which made a reference to the laptop. No fellow members of Congress co-sponsored the article.

=== Other press outlets ===
The New York Times, The Washington Post and The Wall Street Journal stated that they could not independently verify the data provided by the New York Post. NBC News requested a copy of the hard drive from Giuliani, who said he would not provide one and offered it copies of a small portion of emails instead. In May 2022, NBC News published an analysis of a copy of the hard drive they received from Giuliani and documents released by Republicans on two Senate committees. The analysis found that Hunter Biden's firm took in $11 million from 2013 to 2018 and spent the money fast. The analysis also found that few of Hunter Biden's deals ever came to fruition.

In 2020, David Folkenflik of NPR observed that the New York Post story asserted as facts things it presumed to be true. He also noted that the credited lead author of the story, deputy political editor Emma-Jo Morris, had virtually no previous bylines in reporting. Her most significant prior employment was a nearly four-year position as a producer on Sean Hannity's Fox News program. Hannity, a close Trump advisor, had repeatedly suggested wrongdoing by Biden in Ukraine. During a House subcommittee hearing held by the Department of Government Efficiency in 2025 titled "Anti-American Airwaves: Holding the Heads of NPR and PBS Accountable," NPR CEO Katherine Maher responded to concerns of bias, saying that NPR abides by journalistic standards while serving a diverse audience, and that "NPR acknowledges that we were mistaken and failing to cover the Hunter Biden laptop story more aggressively and sooner."

Vanity Fair observed the story had exposed an ongoing journalistic "cold war" within Rupert Murdoch's media empire, which includes the New York Post, Fox News, and The Wall Street Journal. In particular, it described an internal rift over coverage by the Journal, which published an opinion article by conservative columnist Kimberley Strassel inflating the claims, before running a news article which "swept the legs out from under their Opinion colleague's argument" four hours later. Ryan Lizza of Politico wrote: "Reporters at the WSJ, Fox News, and NYP have all come to the same conclusion about these documents but they are being drowned out by bad faith activists on the opinion side at these Murdoch companies who favor Trump's re-election."

In April 2022, the editorial board of The Washington Post gave its opinion about a report published by the Post that month:

The investigation adds new details and confirms old ones about the ways in which Joe Biden's family has profited from trading overseas on his name—something for which the president deserves criticism for tacitly condoning. What it does not do, despite some conservatives' insistence otherwise, is prove that President Biden acted corruptly.

Joan Donovan, the research director of the Shorenstein Center on Media, Politics, and Public Policy at Harvard University, wrote: "This is arguably the most well-known story the New York Post has ever published and it endures as a story because it was initially suppressed by social media companies and jeered by politicians and pundits alike."

Former Politico reporters Marc Caputo and Tara Palmeri said in January 2025 that, because of "dumb decisions of cowardly editors", they were told "Don't write about the laptop, don't talk about the laptop, don't tweet about the laptop". Caputo said the Bertrand story about the 51 former officials had a "terrible, ill-fated headline ... because the Hunter Biden laptop appeared to be true". In 2019 the campaign of a rival Democratic candidate for the 2020 presidential election gave Caputo opposition research on Burisma and Hunter Biden but "That story was killed by the editors, and they gave no explanation for that either", he recalled.

== See also ==
- Biden–Ukraine conspiracy theory
- Trump–Ukraine scandal § Ukraine and the Bidens
