= Garrett Ziegler =

American political activist and former political aide

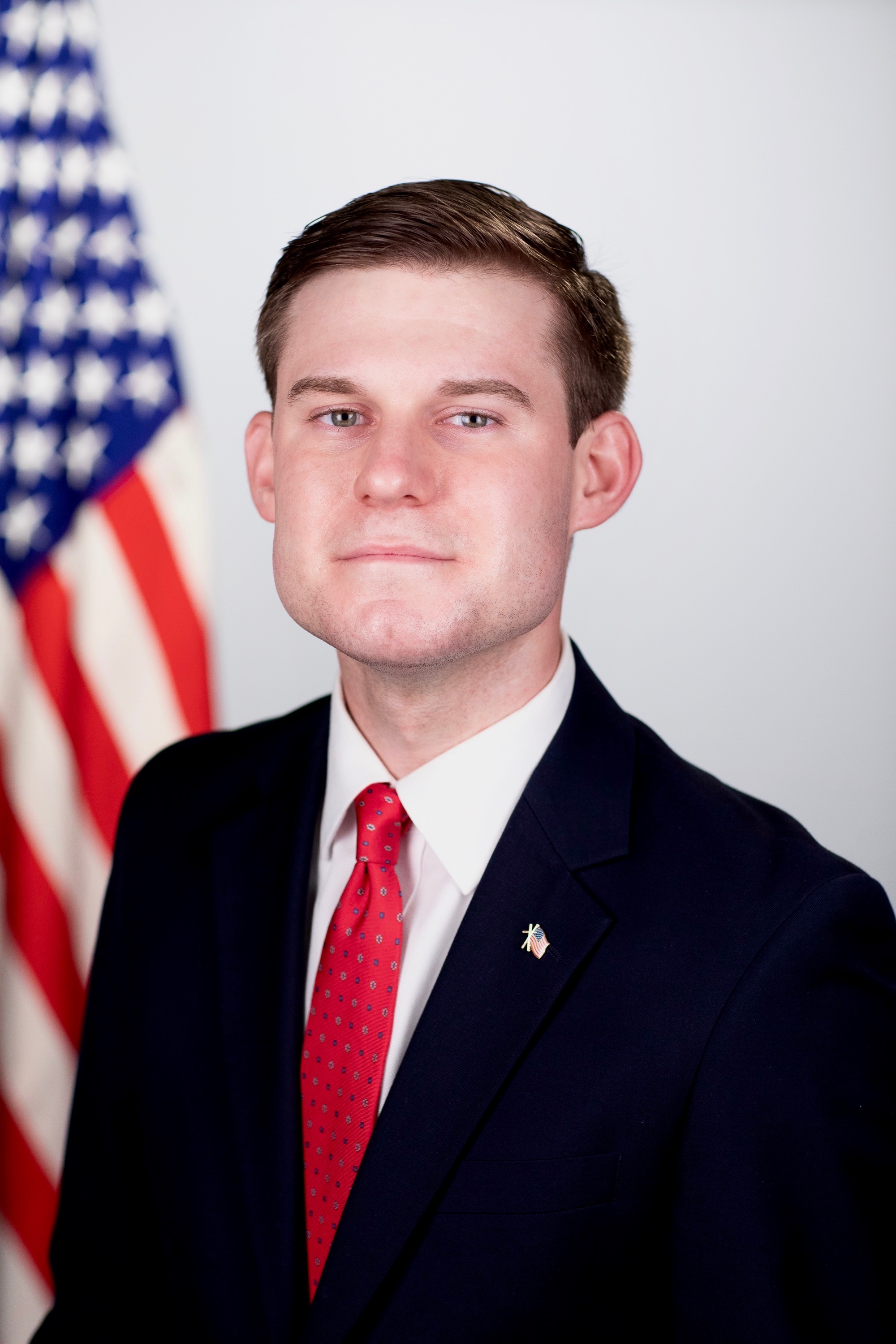
- Ziegler in a 2020 White House staff portrait

White House Office of Trade and Manufacturing Policy
- In office February, 2019 – January, 2021
- President: Donald Trump

Personal details
- Education: Saint Louis University (BS)

Garrett Ziegler is an American political activist and former political aide who worked as a White House staffer in the first administration of U.S. President Donald Trump. He is also known for founding the nonprofit Marco Polo, which compiles and publishes (often negative) information about the Biden family, particularly Hunter Biden. He has been described as an informal "Hunter Biden specialist", and his actions in this realm have had him sued by Biden and others.

== Early life and education ==
Ziegler was raised by his parents in Altamont, Illinois, and in 2014 graduated from Altamont High School. He then attended Saint Louis University, graduating magna cum laude in 2018 with a bachelor's degree in economics.

== White House staff position ==
Ziegler was employed by the White House coming out of college, serving as a policy analyst in the Office of Trade and Manufacturing Policy, under Peter Navarro. He served in this position from February 2019 to January 2021. During this role, he wrote reports on numerous issues, espousing, among other opinions, that the COVID-19 pandemic was planned and the 2020 election was stolen.

=== December 18, 2020, Trump meeting ===
Ziegler received media attention, and scrutiny from the Jan. 6 committee, for his actions on December 18, 2020, when he escorted Michael Flynn and Sidney Powell into the White House for a meeting with President Trump. During the meeting, Trump was unsuccessfully urged to seize voting machines using military force. Ziegler had credentials revoked after the incident.

== Marco Polo and other actions related to the Biden family ==
Ziegler is the founder of a nonprofit named Marco Polo, and both he and his organization have been prolific in releasing information about the Biden family, particularly revolving around Hunter Biden and data purported to be from his laptop. This has included an October 2022 release of a long report on the laptop that alleged numerous crimes were committed by Hunter Biden, releases of about 120,000 emails and other files, along with almost 10,000 photos, both caches claimed to be from the laptop, and publishing a transcription of a diary written by Biden's sister, Ashley.

=== Reception ===
Ziegler has said he first received a copy of the laptop's data through Rudy Giuliani and Bernard Kerik in late 2020. Republican activist Jack Maxey claimed that in December 2020, he gave Ziegler a copy of the data to bring to the Director of National Intelligence, but that Ziegler instead retained it. In response, Ziegler stated that Maxey indeed gave him a copy of the data, but that he received another copy from Kerik and returned the copy Maxey gave him. Maxey has also accused Ziegler of profiting from the laptop through donations to his organization.

Several Republican lawmakers have discussed his work, especially his October 2022 report. Senator Ron Johnson said in an interview that "you ought to read the Marco Polo report where they detail all kinds of potential crimes." Representative James Comer endorsed the report's detailing of banking records, and some spectators noted that in a congressional hearing, Representative Marjorie Taylor Greene displayed images of Hunter Biden in similar orders and with similar redactions as the Marco Polo report, from which Ziegler believes that she did indeed consult his report.

== Legal and governmental issues ==
=== January 6th Committee meeting ===
Ziegler met with the January 6th Committee on July 19, 2022, believed to have been related to the December 18, 2020 White House meeting. Media speculation prior to the committee meeting believed he would be a witness to the committee due to his connections with Navarro, the December 18 meeting, and his other knowledge about Trump's dispositions late in the administration. After attending the committee, he posted a lengthy response on his Telegram page, described by spectators as vulgar and sexist. In it, he called the body "a Bolshevistic anti-White campaign", and among other claims, said he was being targeted based on his Christianity.

=== Legal issues ===
Ziegler was brought onto the child support case between Lunden Roberts and Hunter Biden by Robert's lawyers, who had him designated an expert witness. They stated Ziegler was "an expert in Hunter Biden" and many details of his life. At first, Biden's attorneys opposed his inclusion on the grounds of a lack of expertise and an alleged bias against Biden, but eventually conceded to his inclusion. Ziegler then gave a deposition to the court. The case was eventually settled.

In September 2023, Ziegler was sued by Hunter Biden for allegedly violating privacy laws when "accessing, tampering with, manipulating, altering, copying and damaging computer data" of Biden's. The suit describes Ziegler as a "zealot who has waged a sustained, unhinged and obsessed campaign against [Hunter Biden] and the entire Biden family for more than two years." In June 2024 Judge Hernán Vera rejected a motion by Ziegler to dismiss the suit based on the First Amendment and Anti-SLAPP statutes, saying the motion "lacks merit." In March 2025, Hunter Biden moved to dismiss the lawsuit due to him lacking the finances to continue the case, but still contended publicly that the claims had merit. Ziegler took the unusual move of opposing the dismissal as the defendant, stating that he wanted compensation for his attorney's fees. Following these motions, Judge Vera dismissed the case with prejudice in the same month.

Ziegler was also sued by Kevin Morris, friend and patron of Hunter Biden, on claims of doxing his personal information and harassment.

== Personal life ==
Ziegler is a Lutheran, and lives with his family in Illinois. He is a cousin of Richard Nixon's press secretary, Ron Ziegler.
