= If We Break =

2022 memoir by Kathleen Buhle

If We Break: A Memoir of Marriage, Addiction and Healing
- Author: Kathleen Buhle
- Language: English
- Genre: Memoir
- Published: June 14, 2022
- Publisher: Crown Publishing Group
- Pages: 300
- ISBN: 9780593241073

If We Break: A Memoir of Marriage, Addiction and Healing is a 2022 memoir by Kathleen Buhle, the former wife of Hunter Biden. The book centers around the couple's marriage and is critical of Biden, noting his alcoholism, drug abuse, and extramarital affairs.

== Publication ==
The 300-page book was published on June 14, 2022, by Penguin Random House subsidiary Crown Publishing Group. It was written by Kathleen Buhle, previously known as Kathleen Biden, and published while Buhle's former father-in law, Joe Biden, was the president of the United States, and a year after her former husband, Hunter Biden, published his memoir Beautiful Things. Professional writer Susan Conley assisted Buhle in the writing of the book. Prior to publication, parts of the book were published by People.

== Synopsis ==
If We Break recounts her first meeting of Hunter Biden in 1992 at a Jesuit Volunteer Corps event in Oregon when she was aged 23. After Buhle became pregnant, the couple wed in 1993.

Buhle writes about Biden's tax problems and alcoholism during the 2000s. The book recounts Biden entering rehabilitation programs in 2003 and again in 2012. Buhle describes Hunter Biden's drinking worsening after his brother Beau Biden received a terminal cancer diagnosis. Buhle is critical of Biden, accusing him of nastiness towards her, especially the implication that she lacked intelligence. If We Break notes Biden's extramarital affairs, including with his brother's widow Hallie Olivere Biden. Buhle writes that Biden admitted to five affairs with sex workers.

The book also recounts Biden's expulsion from the United States Navy for cocaine use. Buhle notes her ongoing acceptance of lies from Biden prior to the couple's 2017 divorce. The book briefly discusses Buhle's friendship with Michelle Obama and the author receiving a colon cancer diagnosis after her divorce.

== Critical reception ==
Lloyd Green, in a review for The Guardian, wrote that "A lot revolves around Hunter," and describing the memoir as "another addition to the canon of opposition research on the Bidens, should Joe Biden run for re-election." Kirkus Reviews noted Buhle "plays a relatively small role" in Beautiful Things, the memoir written by Hunter Biden, "while hers focuses solely on their relationship," and states her book is "remarkably lacking in both sensationalism and vengeance". Karen Heller's review in The Washington Post states "There are constant trivialities about how handsome Hunter looks in a suit and exchanges of 'I love you' between the couple. Note to memoir authors: Don't do this."
