= Hunter Biden =

American businessman and lobbyist (born 1970)

- Biden in 2014
- Born: Robert Hunter Biden; February 4, 1970 (age 56); Wilmington, Delaware, U.S.
- Education: Georgetown University (BA); Yale University (JD)
- Occupations: Artist; businessman
- Spouses: Kathleen Buhle (m. 1993; div. 2017); Melissa Cohen (m. 2019)
- Partner: Hallie Olivere Biden (2016–2019)
- Children: 5
- Parents: Joe Biden; Neilia Hunter Biden
- Relatives: Biden family
- Military career
- Branch: United States Navy
- Service years: 2013–2014
- Rank: Ensign
- Unit: United States Navy Reserve

Robert Hunter Biden (born February 4, 1970) is an American artist, disbarred former attorney, and businessman. He is the second son of former president Joe Biden and his first wife, Neilia Hunter Biden. Hunter Biden was a founding board member of BHR Partners, a Chinese investment company, in 2013, and later served on the board of Burisma, one of the largest private natural gas producers in Ukraine, from 2014 until his term expired in April 2019. He has worked as a lobbyist and legal representative for lobbying firms, a hedge fund principal, and a venture capital and private equity fund investor.

Since early 2019, Hunter and his father have been the targets of false allegations that Joe pressured Ukraine to fire their Prosecutor General to protect Hunter, which intensified after the New York Post published an article in October 2020 about a laptop computer that had belonged to Hunter Biden. Biden was convicted of three federal firearms-related felony charges in June 2024 after he had admitted to illegally owning a gun while a drug user. His tax affairs came under federal criminal investigation in late 2018, and in September 2024, he pleaded guilty to all of the tax charges.

In December 2024, Biden's father pardoned him for all federal offenses committed between 2014 and 2024, including any potential offenses not yet discovered. In 2025, he was disbarred in both Washington, D.C. and by the Connecticut Bar. In 2025, he began working as the development director for a nonprofit tenants' rights organization.

== Early life and education ==
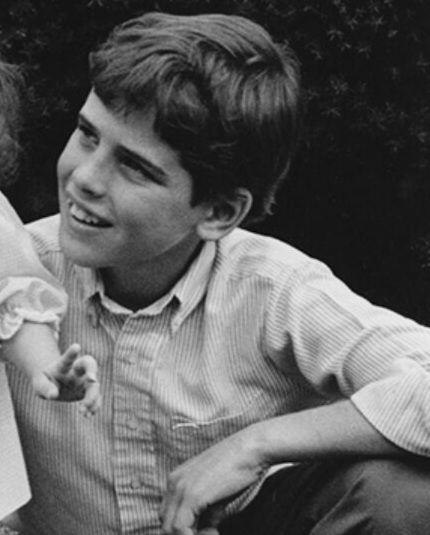
Biden as a child, c. 1980s

Robert Hunter Biden was born on February 4, 1970, in Wilmington, Delaware, the second son of Neilia Biden (née Hunter) and Joe Biden. His mother and younger sister Naomi died in an automobile crash on December 18, 1972. Biden and his older brother Beau were also seriously injured but survived. Beau suffered multiple broken bones while Hunter sustained a fractured skull and severe traumatic brain injuries. Both spent several months in the hospital, during which time their father was sworn into the U.S. Senate in January 1973. Hunter and Beau later encouraged their father to marry again, and Jill Jacobs Stevenson became their stepmother in 1977. Biden's half-sister Ashley was born in 1981.

Like his father and brother, Biden attended the Catholic high school Archmere Academy in Claymont, Delaware. He graduated with a Bachelor of Arts degree in history from Georgetown University in 1992. During the year after he graduated from college, he served as a Jesuit volunteer at a church in Portland, Oregon, and met Kathleen Buhle, whom he married in 1993. After attending the Georgetown University Law Center for one year, he transferred to Yale Law School and graduated in 1996.

== Early career ==
After graduating from law school in 1996, Biden accepted a consultant position at the bank holding company MBNA, whose employees donated more than $200,000 (equivalent to $410,567 in 2025) to his father's senate campaigns over the years. Biden delayed his start date at MBNA to serve as co-chair for his father's reelection campaign. By 1998, Hunter Biden had risen to the rank of executive vice president. Biden departed from MBNA in 1998. He then served at the United States Department of Commerce, focusing on ecommerce policy for President Bill Clinton's administration.

In 2001, Biden became a lobbyist, co-founding the firm of Oldaker, Biden & Belair. According to Adam Entous of The New Yorker, Biden and his father established a relationship in which "[Joe] Biden wouldn't ask Hunter about his lobbying clients, and Hunter wouldn't tell his father about them". In 2001, he was also rehired by MBNA as a consultant, where he was paid a yearly $100,000 retainer until 2005. MBNA's rehiring of Biden was controversial because his father was pushing for passage of the Bankruptcy Abuse Prevention and Consumer Protection Act, which was beneficial to the credit card industry and supported by MBNA during Biden's time at the bank. The legislation made it more difficult to get bankruptcy protection.

Biden was appointed to a five-year term on the board of directors of Amtrak by President George W. Bush in 2006. Biden was the board's vice chairman from July 2006 until he was replaced as vice chairman in January 2009. He resigned from the board that February, shortly after his father became vice president. Biden said during his father's vice-presidential campaign that it was time for his lobbying activities to end.

=== Navy Reserve ===
Biden's application for a position in the U.S. Navy Reserve was approved in May 2013. At age 43, Biden was accepted as part of a program that allows a limited number of applicants with desirable skills to receive commissions and serve in staff positions. Biden received an age-related waiver and a waiver for a past drug-related incident; he was sworn in as a direct commission officer by his father in a White House ceremony. Results of a routine urinalysis taken on Biden's first weekend of reserve duty revealed cocaine in his system. He was discharged administratively in February 2014. Biden attributed the result to having smoked a cigarette that he had asked a group of men outside a store to give him, claiming the cigarette contained cocaine as well as tobacco. He did not appeal the discharge.

== Investing, lobbying, and philanthropy ==
In 2006, Biden and his uncle James Biden purchased international hedge fund Paradigm Global Advisors with an $8 million promissory note (equivalent to $12,776,494 in 2025). The joint promotion of the fund by an entity of the troubled Stanford Financial Group hastened the unwinding of the company in 2010. In September 2008, Hunter Biden founded a consultancy company named Seneca Global Advisors that offered to help companies expand into foreign markets. Biden was a partner in investment vehicles that included the name "Seneca" to denote his participation. In 2009, Biden, Devon Archer, and Christopher Heinz founded the investment and advisory firm Rosemont Seneca Partners. Biden also co-founded venture capital firm Eudora Global. Biden held the position of counsel in the law firm Boies Schiller Flexner LLP in 2014. From 2011 to 2017, Biden was on the board of directors of World Food Program USA, a 501(c)(3) charity based in Washington, D.C., that supports the work of the UN World Food Programme; he served as board chairman from 2011 to 2015.

A detailed analysis of Hunter Biden's hard drive by NBC News showed that Biden and his firm were paid $11 million (equivalent to $15,203,571 in 2025) from 2013 to 2018, including $3.8 million (equivalent to $5,252,143 in 2025) in payments from CEFC China Energy, a defunct oil and gas company with links to the Chinese Communist Party, as well as from Burisma Holdings. In the U.S. criminal tax case against Biden, prosecutors alleged that he accepted payments from Romanian businessman Gabriel Popoviciu to influence U.S. government agencies regarding a criminal probe in Romania. The allegations dated back to his work for Popoviciu in 2015, during Joe Biden's vice presidency.

=== BHR Partners ===
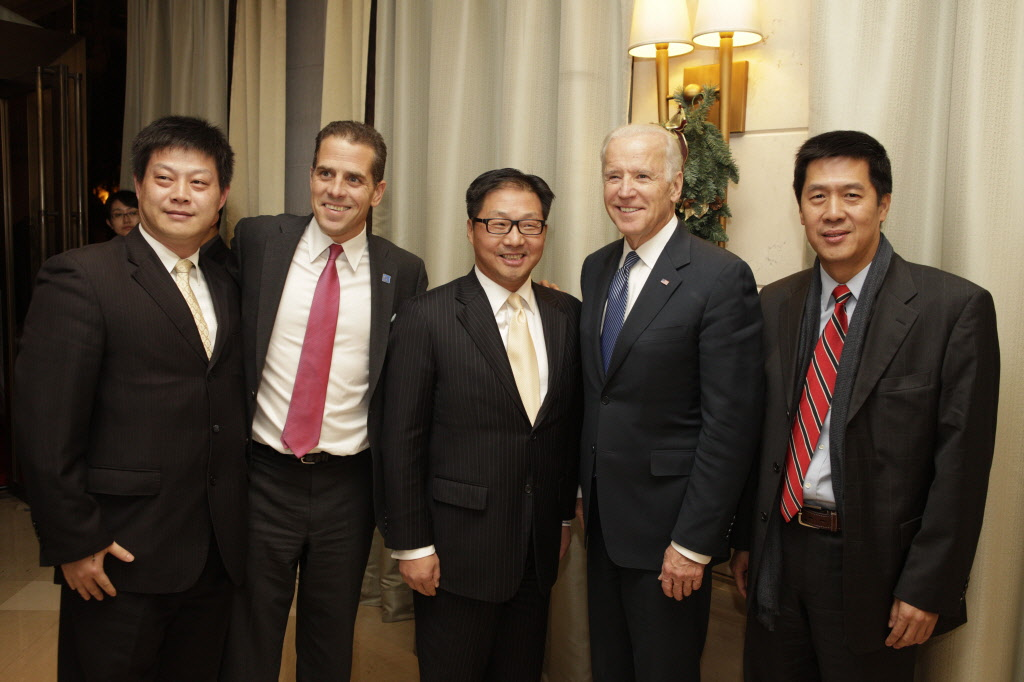
Hunter Biden and then-vice president Joe Biden posing for a photograph with BHR Partners CEO Jonathan Li (center) and managing partner Ming Xue (right) in China, 2013

From 2013 to 2020, Biden served as a member of the board of the China-based private equity fund BHR Partners, of which he acquired a 10% stake in 2017 at a discount to actual value and with borrowed money. The founders of BHR Partners included Biden's Rosemont Seneca Partners investment firm (20% equity), along with U.S.-based Thornton Group LLC (10% equity) and two asset managers registered in China. The Chinese-registered asset managers are the Bank of China (via BOC International Holdings-backed Bohai Industrial Investment Fund Management) and Deutsche Bank-backed Harvest Fund Management.

In September 2019, while President Donald Trump was accusing Hunter Biden of malfeasance in Ukraine, he also falsely claimed that Biden "walk[ed] out of China with $1.5 billion in a fund" (equivalent to $1.888910582×10^{9} in 2025). Later in 2019, The Wall Street Journal confirmed that Trump was incorrect in claiming that Hunter received this $1.5 billion, stating that Trump had no evidence to support the claim and that he incorrectly interpreted BHR's past fundraising target of $1.5 billion; BHR invested money raised from other companies and did not keep the funds. Trump publicly called upon China to investigate Hunter Biden's business activities there while his father was vice president.

Hunter Biden announced his resignation from the board of directors of BHR Partners, effective the end of October 2019, citing "the barrage of false charges" by then-U.S. president Trump. This was confirmed by Biden's attorney, who said in November 2021 that his client no longer held any direct or indirect interest in BHR. However, as of April 2020, Chinese business records showed that Hunter Biden remained a board member of BHR. According to his lawyer, Biden had "not received any compensation for being on BHR's board of directors" nor had he received any return on his equity share in BHR. Biden's lawyer George Mesires told The Washington Post that BHR Partners had been "capitalized from various sources with a total of 30 million RMB (Renminbi), or about $4.2 million, not $1.5 billion". Biden's solely owned company Skaneateles LLC owned a 10% equity stake in BHR as of December 2020. In November 2021, New York Times reported that "Chinese corporate records show Skaneateles remains a part owner of BHR". Skaneateles was dissolved in 2022.

BHR Partners invests Chinese venture capital into tech startups, such as an early-stage investment in Chinese auto hailing app DiDi and cross-border acquisitions in automotive and mining, for example, the purchase of a stake in Democratic Republic of Congo copper and cobalt producer Tenke Fungurume Mining. The New York Times reported that BHR Partners helped finance a coal-mining company in Australia that was controlled by a Chinese state-owned enterprise, assisted a subsidiary of a Chinese defense company in acquiring an auto parts manufacturer in Michigan, and in 2016, facilitated the $3.8 billion (equivalent to $5.097753744×10^{9} in 2025) purchase of the DRC cobalt mine. A former BHR board member told the Times that Biden and the other American BHR founder, Devon Archer, were not involved in the mine deal.

=== Burisma Holdings ===
In April 2014, Biden joined the board of Burisma Holdings owned by Ukrainian oligarch and former politician Mykola Zlochevsky, who was facing a money laundering investigation just after the Ukrainian revolution. Biden's business partner, Devon Archer, had joined the board of Burisma several months prior. Biden was hired to help Burisma with requesting assistance from the U.S. government to expand its business and corporate governance best practices, while still an attorney with Boies Schiller Flexner. A consulting firm in which Biden is a partner was also retained by Burisma. Christopher Heinz, John Kerry's stepson, opposed his partners Devon Archer and Hunter Biden joining the board in 2014 due to the reputational risk. Biden served on the board of Burisma until his term expired in April 2019, receiving compensation of up to $50,000 per month (equivalent to $68,000 in 2025). Because Joe Biden played a major role in U.S. policy towards Ukraine, some Ukrainian anti-corruption advocates and Obama administration officials expressed concern that Hunter Biden having joined the board could create the appearance of a conflict of interest and undermine Joe Biden's anti-corruption work in Ukraine. While serving as vice president, Joe Biden joined other Western leaders in encouraging the government of Ukraine to fire the country's top prosecutor Viktor Shokin, who was widely criticized for blocking corruption investigations. The Ukrainian parliament voted to remove Shokin in March 2016.

Biden lobbied the U.S. State Department on behalf of Burisma to help secure a potentially lucrative energy project in Italy while his father was still Vice President. In 2016, Biden wrote a letter to the U.S. ambassador to Italy, John R. Phillips, which Biden's lawyer described as seeking to arrange an introduction between Burisma and the then president of Italy's Tuscany region Enrico Rossi, the location of a potential Burisma energy project. A businessman involved in Burisma's project said that the outreach was undertaken at a time when Burisma was having difficulty securing regulatory approval for its Tuscany project. Embassy officials who handled the letter were concerned about the son of the sitting vice president reaching out on behalf of a foreign company, and Biden's request for a meeting was ultimately unmet. As President, Joe Biden released records confirming Hunter Biden's lobbying effort after dropping out of his 2024 presidential campaign, and denied being aware of it while vice president.

Since early 2019, Hunter and his father Joe Biden have been the subjects of false and baseless claims of corrupt activities in a Biden–Ukraine conspiracy theory pushed by then-U.S. president Donald Trump and his allies. Trump and his personal lawyer Rudy Giuliani claimed in 2019, without evidence, that Joe Biden had sought the dismissal of Shokin in order to protect his son and Burisma Holdings. Actually, it was the official policy of the United States and the European Union to seek Shokin's removal. There has also been no evidence produced of wrongdoing by Hunter Biden in Ukraine. The Ukrainian anti-corruption investigation agency stated in September 2019 that its current investigation of Burisma was restricted solely to investigating the period from 2010 to 2012, before Hunter Biden joined Burisma in 2014. Shokin, in May 2019, claimed that he was fired because he had been actively investigating Burisma, but U.S. and Ukrainian officials have stated that the investigation into Burisma was dormant at the time of Shokin's dismissal. Ukrainian and United States State Department sources note that Shokin was fired for failing to address corruption, including within his office.

In July 2019, Trump ordered the freezing of $391 million (equivalent to $492,376,025 in 2025) in military aid, shortly before a telephone conversation with Ukrainian president Volodymyr Zelenskyy in which Trump asked Zelenskyy to initiate an investigation of the Bidens. Trump falsely told Zelenskyy that "[Joe] Biden went around bragging that he stopped the prosecution" of his son; Joe Biden did not stop any prosecution, did not brag about doing so, and there is no evidence his son was ever under investigation. The United States House of Representatives initiated a formal impeachment inquiry on September 24, 2019, against Trump on the grounds that he may have sought to use U.S. foreign aid and the Ukrainian government to damage Joe Biden's 2020 presidential campaign. Ukrainian prosecutor general Yuriy Lutsenko said in May 2019 that Hunter Biden had not violated Ukrainian law. After Lutsenko was replaced by Ruslan Riaboshapka as prosecutor general, Lutsenko and Riaboshapka said in September and October 2019 respectively that they had seen no evidence of wrongdoing by Hunter Biden.

During 2019 and 2020, Republican senators Ron Johnson and Chuck Grassley investigated Hunter Biden's involvement with Burisma, as well as allegations that Democrats colluded with the Ukrainian government to interfere in the 2016 election. The chairman of the Senate Intelligence Committee Republican senator Richard Burr privately expressed concerns to the senators that their inquiries could assist efforts by Russian intelligence to spread disinformation to disrupt American domestic affairs. American intelligence officials briefed senators in late 2019 about Russian efforts to frame Ukraine for 2016 election interference. Johnson said he would release findings in spring 2020, as Democrats would be selecting their 2020 presidential nominee, but instead ramped up the investigation at Trump's urging in May 2020, after it became clear that Joe Biden would be the nominee. Trump tweeted a press report about the investigations, later stating that he would make allegations of corruption by the Bidens a central theme of his re-election campaign. Johnson decided in March 2020 against issuing a subpoena for former Ukrainian official Andrii Telizhenko, a Giuliani associate who had made appearances on the pro-Trump cable channel One America News, after the FBI briefed him about concerns Telizhenko could be spreading Russian disinformation. The State Department revoked Telizhenko's visa in October 2020, and CNN reported the American government was considering sanctioning him as a Russian agent. CNN reported that Vladislav Davidzon, the editor of Ukrainian magazine The Odessa Review, told CNN that in 2018 Telizhenko offered him money to lobby Republican senators in support of pro-Russian television stations in Ukraine. When Johnson released the final report on the investigation, it contained no evidence that Joe Biden had pushed for Shokin's removal in order to benefit Hunter or Burisma.

In June 2020, former Ukrainian prosecutor general Ruslan Riaboshapka stated that an audit of thousands of old case files he had ordered in October 2019 had found no wrongdoing by Hunter Biden. Riaboshapka was described by Zelenskyy as "100 percent my person" during the July 2019 call in which Trump asked him to investigate Biden. Ukrainian lawmaker Andrii Derkach, an associate of Rudy Giuliani with links to Russian intelligence, released in May 2020 alleged snippets of recordings of Joe Biden speaking with Ukrainian president Petro Poroshenko during the years Hunter Biden worked for Burisma. The recordings, which were not verified as authentic and appeared heavily edited, depicted Biden linking loan guarantees for Ukraine to the ouster of the country's prosecutor general. The recordings did not provide evidence to support the ongoing conspiracy theory that Biden wanted the prosecutor fired to protect his son. Poroshenko denied in June 2020 that Joe Biden ever approached him about Burisma. The United States Department of the Treasury sanctioned Derkach in September 2020, stating he "has been an active Russian agent for over a decade, maintaining close connections with the Russian Intelligence Services". The Treasury Department added Derkach "waged a covert influence campaign centered on cultivating false and unsubstantiated narratives concerning U.S. officials in the upcoming 2020 Presidential Election" including by the release of "edited audio tapes and other unsupported information with the intent to discredit U.S. officials". Close associates of Derkach were also sanctioned by the Treasury Department in January 2021. United States intelligence community analysis released in March 2021 found that Derkach was among proxies of Russian intelligence who promoted and laundered misleading or unsubstantiated narratives about Biden "to US media organizations, US officials, and prominent US individuals, including some close to former President Trump and his administration".

Two Republicans on a Senate investigation committee in 2020 claimed that Russian businessperson Yelena Baturina, the wife of former Moscow mayor Yury Luzhkov, wire-transferred $3.5 million in 2014 (equivalent to $4,759,980 in 2025) to Rosemont Seneca Thornton, of which Biden had previously been a partner. The Washington Post reported in April 2022 that the partners of Rosemont Seneca Thornton had agreed to dissolve the organization before the 2014 wire transfer, though it continued to be operated by Devin Archer to facilitate real estate transactions for eastern and central Asia investors, while Biden was uninvolved. Archer received the $3.5 million wire from Baturina to purchase property in Brooklyn, New York. The Senate report cited unspecified confidential documents and gave no evidence that Biden personally accepted the funds. Biden's attorney denied the report, saying Biden had no financial relationship with Baturina and no stake in the partnership that received the money, nor did he co-found the partnership. However, Trump's White House spokeswoman Alyssa Farah repeated the claim, and in a press conference Trump repeatedly asserted that Biden received millions of dollars from the former mayor's wife.

== Investigations and federal indictments ==
In December 2020, Biden made a public announcement via his attorney that his tax affairs were under federal criminal investigation. The New York Times and CNN described the investigation as having started in late 2018 and being related to potential violations of tax and money laundering laws and Biden's business dealings in foreign countries, principally China. The Wall Street Journal reported that Biden had provided legal and consulting services that generated foreign-earned income, citing a Senate Republicans' report that $4.79 million (equivalent to $6,141,433 in 2025) in wire transfers from entities linked to Chinese energy tycoon Ye Jianming and his company, CEFC China Energy, were paying for such services.

The New York Times reported in March 2022 that, since 2018, Biden and possibly others had been under investigation by federal prosecutors in Delaware, with a grand jury convened to subpoena and hear evidence. The investigation examined payments and gifts Biden or his associates had received from foreign interests and whether Biden had violated the law by not registering as a lobbyist under the Foreign Agents Registration Act (FARA). The Times reported it had acquired emails that were authenticated by people familiar with them and the investigation that appeared to come from a laptop belonging to Biden. One April 2014 email, written by Biden to his business partner as their work with Burisma was about to begin, noted that his father, then the vice president who would soon visit Kyiv, should "be characterized as part of our advice and thinking—but what he will say and do is out of our hands". The email also stated that Burisma officials "need to know in no uncertain terms that we will not and cannot intervene directly with domestic policymakers, and that we need to abide by FARA and any other U.S. laws in the strictest sense across the board". Biden wrote that his father's visit "could be a really good thing or it could end up creating too great an expectation. We need to temper expectations regarding that visit." He also wrote that his employer, the law firm Boies Schiller Flexner, could help Burisma through "direct discussions at state, energy and NSC [United States National Security Council]". Other emails showed Biden and his business partner discussing inviting foreign business associates, including a Burisma executive, to attend an April 2015 dinner in Washington, where the vice president would stop by.

A July 2022 report from CNN authenticated emails which showed that Biden was struggling with large debt and overdue tax bills. In October 2022, The Washington Post reported that federal agents had determined months prior that they had assembled enough evidence for a viable criminal case against Biden to charge him with crimes related to making false declarations during a gun purchase, as well as tax-related crimes. The next step was for Delaware U.S. attorney David C. Weiss, a holdover from the Trump administration, to decide on whether to file such charges. Federal investigators had also been examining the lobbying firm Blue Star Strategies, which Burisma retained while Biden sat on its board, for possible illegal lobbying of American officials. There was no indication Biden was a subject of the investigation. Blue Star employees said in Senate testimony that Biden was included in emails about the firm's work but that he was not particularly involved. One of the firm's co-founders said Biden did not direct its work. Blue Star's work came after Burisma's owner was criticized by the United States State Department, and the firm's founders testified the firm had merely approached officials to determine the government's views of Burisma.

On June 20, 2023, in a deal with prosecutors, Biden agreed to plead guilty to two misdemeanor tax charges of failure to pay income tax, and to enter a pretrial diversion program related to a felony gun charge of unlawful possession of a firearm. Prosecutors recommended two years of probation for the tax charges; the gun charge would be dropped at the end of this period if the conditions of the diversion program had been met successfully. Having the gun charge dropped was conditional on Biden remaining drug-free and never being allowed to own a firearm again. Biden's attorney said the agreement with prosecutors "resolved" the investigation, though the Justice Department said the investigation was "ongoing".

In court on July 26, 2023, federal prosecutors explained that the "ongoing" aspect of the investigation referred to possible charges under the Foreign Agents Registration Act (FARA); FARA requires that anyone who acts on the behalf of a foreign government, e.g. China or Ukraine, must register with the Department of Justice and file regular reports on their activities for that government. On July 26, the plea deal was rejected by the presiding judge, who cited concerns over immunity Biden might receive from future charges, and gave 30 days to both the government prosecutors and Biden's defense team to provide additional information. Biden changed his plea from "guilty" to "not guilty".

On August 8, Weiss requested appointment as a special counsel in the Biden investigation, which attorney general Merrick Garland granted. Garland announced the appointment on August 11, the same day Weiss announced government and Biden attorneys could not reach agreement on a new plea deal. The Justice Department said on September 6 that Weiss would ask a grand jury to return an indictment of Biden on a gun charge by September 29. On September 14, Biden was officially indicted in Delaware on three federal firearms-related charges: two for making false statements on a firearm application form and one for prohibited possession of a firearm. He was arraigned on October 3 and pleaded not guilty to all charges. Legal experts noted that prosecutions for these charges are rare. In January 2024, prosecutors urged a judge to not dismiss Biden's gun charge, revealing that cocaine residue was found in his gun pouch.

On December 7, 2023, Biden was indicted in California on nine tax charges, including three felony and six misdemeanor offenses. The indictment reads that "The Defendant engaged in a four-year scheme to not pay at least $1.4 million in self-assessed federal taxes he owed for tax years 2016 through 2019." Biden's lawyer said that Biden had repaid his taxes in full prior to the indictment. On January 11, 2024, Biden pleaded not guilty to the tax charges. The same day, U.S. District Judge Mark Scarsi scheduled the trial for June 20, 2024. The trial was later delayed to September 5, 2024, due to the "needs of the defendant" in preparing for his Delaware trial on firearms charges in June. Biden repeatedly sought to dismiss both tax and gun charges against him, without success.

In August 2024, prosecutors alleged that Biden agreed to lobby on behalf of a Romanian businessman seeking to "influence U.S. government agencies" while his father was vice president. The businessman, Gabriel Popoviciu, was under criminal investigation in Romania at the time and hired Biden to assist in fighting his criminal charges through the US government. Prosecutors sought to introduce evidence from Biden's work with Popoviciu as part of his charges on tax evasion. A pre-trial hearing for the tax indictment which involved Biden's lawyers would be held on August 21, 2024.

During the final hearing, Judge Maryellen Noreika ruled that prosecutors could not refer to his upcoming California tax trial, child support proceedings in Arkansas, his discharge from the Navy, or include statements which Biden made at a July 2023 hearing where his plea deal collapsed. However, the prosecution was permitted to bring up Biden's drug use, portions of his memoir, and a summary of data from his laptop, phone, and iPad.

Biden's trial began on June 3, 2024, on charges of unlawfully possessing a gun as a drug user, lying on a federal form when he bought the gun, and making a false statement about information required to be collected by a federally licensed gun dealer. The charges stemmed from a gun purchased and possessed by Biden in October 2018. During the trial, three of Biden's former partners testified regarding Biden's drug usage and gun purchase. On June 11, Biden was found guilty on three felony charges for federal gun violations. The conviction made Biden the first child of a sitting U.S. president to be convicted in a criminal trial. Due to his conviction on felony charges, Biden's license to practice law in Washington, D.C. was suspended. Biden was scheduled to be sentenced on December 12, 2024, which did not occur due to him being pardoned by his father on December 1.

On September 5, 2024, Biden's defense lawyer Abbe Lowell revealed that Biden would change his plea from not guilty to guilty in the federal tax case. Biden had been indicted with three felony charges– one tax evasion count and two counts of filing false returns – and six misdemeanor charges. Under this proposed plea agreement, Biden would have accepted both a sentence and the strength of evidence against him, but also maintained his innocence. Later in the day, it was reported that this plea offer would not be accepted by the prosecution. Initially, Judge Scarsi would neither accept the initial plea offer or call off the trial, but also did not make a final ruling and would opt to make a decision about the plea offer at a later time.

Prosecutors said they would reject an Alford plea. However, Scarsi accepted a guilty plea by the end of the day, with Biden pleading guilty to all nine charges. During his plea hearing, Biden responded "Yes" after Scarsi asked him "Do you agree you committed every element of the charges in the indictment?" Biden was scheduled to be sentenced on December 16, 2024, and he could have faced up to 17 years in prison. Former federal prosecutor, Tom Dupree, told CBS News he expected the judge to impose a sentence of fewer than five years. President Biden, White House press secretary Karine Jean-Pierre, First Lady Jill Biden, and White House spokesperson Andrew Bates repeatedly stated that the president would decline to pardon Hunter or commute his sentence.

=== Pardon of criminal offenses ===
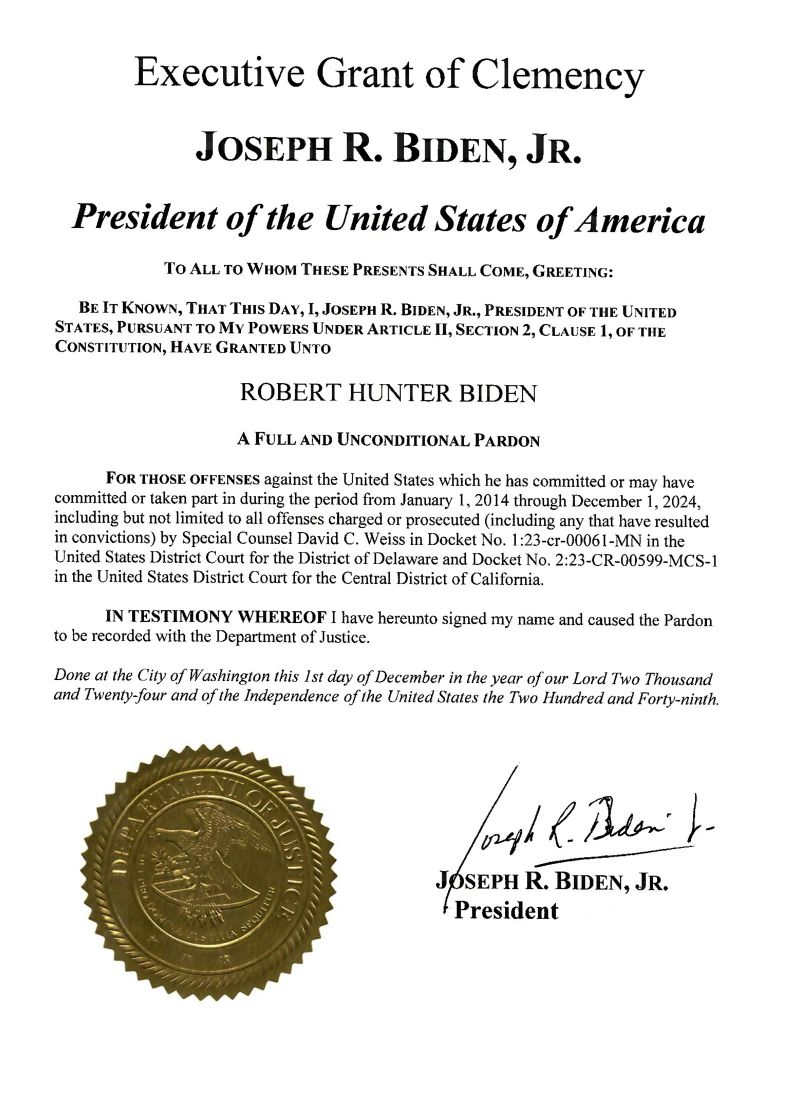
Pardon dated December 1, 2024

Although President Joe Biden and his administration stated on multiple occasions that he would not pardon his son, on December 1, 2024, Biden issued a full and unconditional pardon for his son. The pardon covered all federal offenses committed between January 1, 2014, and December 1, 2024, including his tax charges, gun charges, and any undiscovered charges within that time. In an official White House statement from President Biden, he said that he believed his son was "selectively, and unfairly, prosecuted", and blamed political pressure for the failure of a plea deal for Hunter. He concluded by saying "I hope Americans will understand why a father and a President would come to this decision." The New York Times reported that the plea deal fell apart due to the presiding judge questioning its unusual construction, which violated a basic tenet of federal guilty pleas against having side deals in the plea agreement.

In court filings subsequent to the pardon, special counsel Weiss stated "there was none and never has been any evidence of vindictive or selective prosecution in this case". Judge Scarsi stated that President Biden's characterizations "stand in tension with the case record" and that the Constitution does not "give the president the authority to rewrite history". The scope of the pardon was unusually broad and legal experts could recall only Richard Nixon as someone given similar terms for a pardon, for a term between 1969 and 1974. The breadth of the pardon includes Hunter Biden's "entire tenure on the board of the Ukrainian gas company Burisma, as well as much of his other international work, including in China."

The pardon received bipartisan criticism from members of Congress as harming the justice system. In the months leading up to Hunter's scheduled sentencing, the President had made repeated statements that he would not use the pardon authority for his own son. He and his staff continued to state that there would be no pardon for Hunter as late as November, although internal staff discussions affirmed that the option for a pardon would remain on the table even as Biden publicly stated otherwise. Hunter issued the following statement in response to the pardon:

I have admitted and taken responsibility for my mistakes during the darkest days of my addiction – mistakes that have been exploited to publicly humiliate and shame me and my family for political sport, I will never take the clemency I have been given today for granted and will devote the life I have rebuilt to helping those who are still sick and suffering.

=== Laptop files ===
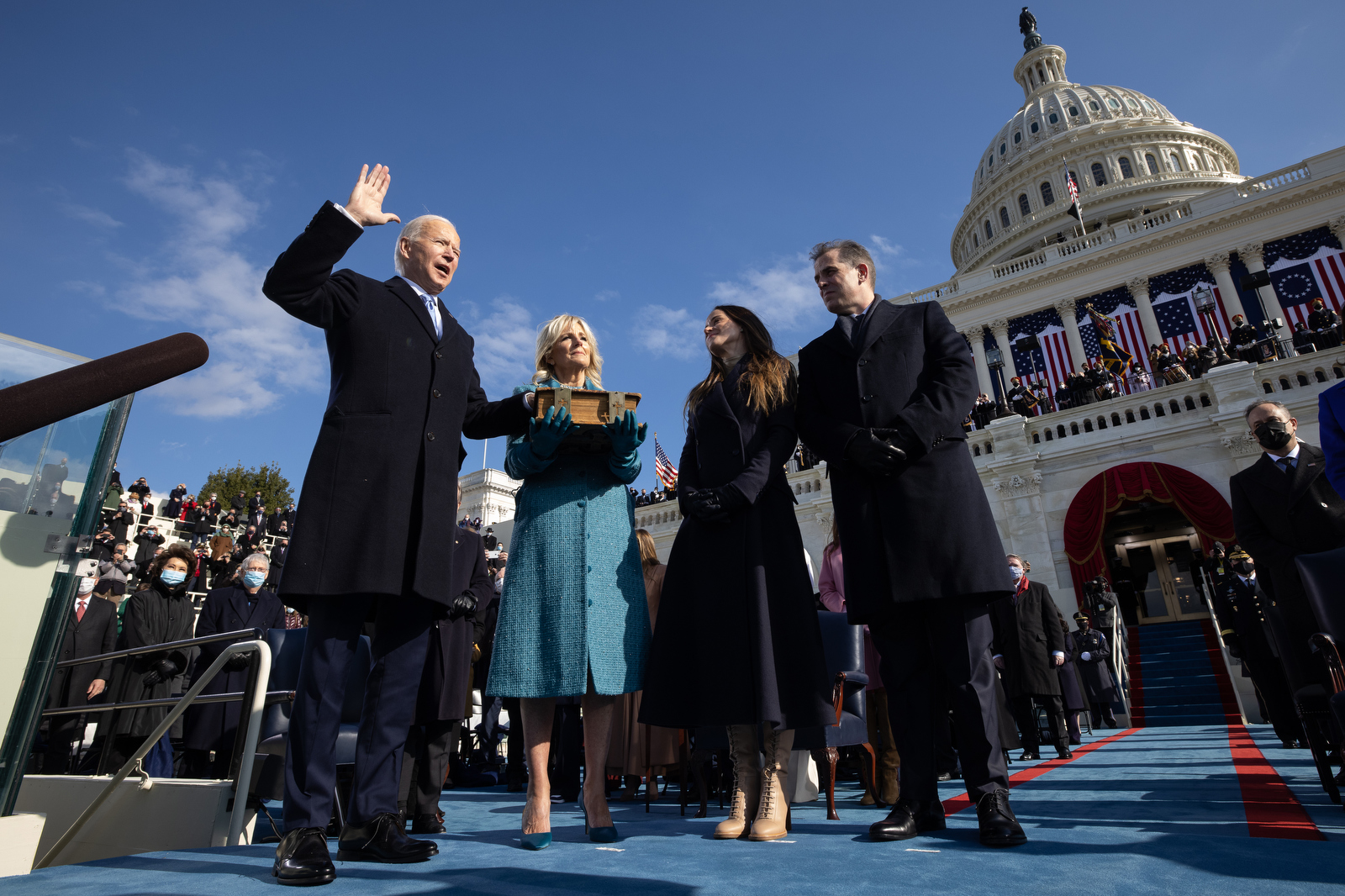
Hunter with his sister Ashley, at their father's inauguration, January 2021. Discovery of Hunter Biden's laptop was an October surprise prior to the 2020 election.

On October 14, 2020, twenty days prior to the 2020 United States presidential election, the New York Post published an article based on content provided to the publication by Donald Trump's personal attorney Rudy Giuliani and former chief strategist Steve Bannon. The article concerned what the Post said was a laptop computer that had belonged to Hunter Biden and that was allegedly left for repairs at a Wilmington, Delaware, computer shop. According to the narrative in the Post article, this device contained an email that referenced a "meeting" between Joe Biden and Vadym Pozharskyi, a Burisma advisor.

The article's veracity was strongly questioned at the time by many mainstream media outlets as well as dozens of current and former intelligence officials for possibly being a Russian disinformation campaign. As of March 25, 2022, Vox reported that there was no evidence to corroborate the intelligence officials' suspicions that the laptop leak was part of a "Russian plot".

In January 2024, federal prosecutors stated that they had possession of a laptop computer which Hunter Biden left at the computer store and confirmed that the device contained files also found in cloud backups to Biden's Apple account. In June 2024, the laptop and its contents were used as evidence during a federal court trial of Hunter Biden for firearms charges. FBI investigators testified at the trial, confirming the authenticity of the laptop, and stating that they had cross-referencing texts, emails, and messages found on the laptop with Apple and had verified the serial number on the laptop. Prosecutors also introduced the invoice from the repair shop as evidence. Biden was deposed by the House Judiciary and Oversight committees on February 28, 2024, which discussed emails found on the laptop. Biden stated during the deposition that he did not recall sending the laptop for repairs.

In February 2023, Hunter Biden's attorneys wrote to the Justice Department National Security Division asking that they criminally investigate "individuals for whom there is considerable reason to believe violated various federal laws in accessing, copying, manipulating, and/or disseminating Mr. Biden's personal computer data". A similar letter was sent to the Attorney General of Delaware. The letters named Giuliani, Bannon, Mac Isaac (owner of the Wilmington computer repair shop where the laptop was abandoned), and others. The special counsel assigned to the case later described Hunter Biden's claim of right-wing bias as "fiction designed for a Hollywood script".

Another event resulting from discovery of the laptop occurred in January 2023: an anonymous Twitter account posted a rental application found on the laptop, leading to a false claim that in 2018 Hunter Biden had paid rent while residing at his father's Delaware home, where classified documents had been found. James Comer, chair of the House Oversight Committee that was investigating the Biden family, inquired whether it was evidence that Hunter Biden illicitly provided money from his foreign business activities to his father. The document was determined to be a quarterly rental payment for office space at the House of Sweden in Washington, D.C.

== Presidency of Joe Biden ==
During his father's presidency, Hunter emerged as one of six key individuals who insulated Joe from scrutiny and acted as an intermediary between him and others. After a poor presidential debate performance by Joe in June 2024 caused intensified public concern about his age and fitness for the presidency, Hunter helped Joe with speech preparation and began joining meetings with the president and his staffers. Hunter maintained daily, often hourly contact with his father on calls. Joe increasingly relied on Hunter for advice, and Hunter emerged as one of the strongest voices in Joe's circle urging him not to drop out of his reelection campaign.

Hunter had been a regular presence in public White House events, but his increased involvement in Biden's presidency and campaign led to surprise and concern from White House staffers. After Joe's poor debate performance, Hunter advocated for Joe to fire some of his top staffers, including Anita Dunn and Bob Bauer. Hunter also began acting as a "de facto gatekeeper" for access to the president. During an interview with Andrew Callaghan in July 2025—his first interview since the 2024 presidential election—Biden castigated David Axelrod, David Plouffe, Anita Dunn, George Clooney, Jake Tapper, James Carville, and others, whom he blamed to various degrees for purportedly forcing his father to withdraw from the 2024 presidential race. Calder McHugh of Politico referred to Biden's statements in the interview as "a view of history that is simply inconsistent with the facts".

== Litigation ==
Between 2023 and 2024, Hunter privately sued numerous individuals, organizations, and the U.S. Government alleging various instances of invasion of privacy and defamation. In September 2023, Biden filed suit against the IRS, claiming unlawful disclosures of his tax return information in relation to two IRS employees who provided information to members of Congress. The D.C. District Court dismissed his claim under the Privacy Act in September 2024, and Biden dropped the suit altogether in 2025. In 2023, Biden sued Garrett Ziegler's Marco Polo organization, accusing the group of invasion of privacy for publishing 128,000 of his emails that were recovered from his lost laptop computer. In March 2025, Biden sought to have the case dismissed due to his worsening personal financial situation and inability to continue to pay for his own legal representation.

In 2024, Biden sued Rudy Giuliani alleging Giuliani was responsible for the "total annihilation" of his privacy due to his involvement in releasing data from his laptop computer. He dropped the lawsuit shortly thereafter. The same year, he sued Fox News for airing images taken from the laptop, but dropped the lawsuit without explanation the following month. Three months later, however, he resurrected the lawsuit in state court. In a statement, Fox News described the second lawsuit as "devoid of any merit". In June 2025, Biden was sued by Winston & Strawn for over $50,000 in unpaid legal fees from its representation of him in his federal criminal cases.

== Later activities and disbarment ==
In February 2020, The New York Times reported that Biden had been painting as an "undiscovered artist" in his Hollywood Hills home. The report also displayed some of his paintings, including "Untitled #4 (a study in ink)" and "Untitled #3 (a signed work)". Biden's art dealer, Georges Bergès, hosted a private viewing for Biden in Los Angeles in fall 2021, followed by an exhibition in New York. Biden's paintings were put up for sale for as much as $500,000 per painting (equivalent to $622,026 in 2025), with Kevin Morris purchasing $875,000 (equivalent to $1,088,546 in 2025) worth of his art. Another buyer was Elizabeth Hirsh Naftali, a prominent California Democratic Party donor who was appointed to the U.S. Commission for the Preservation of America's Heritage Abroad by Joe Biden. Business Insider was unable to verify how much Hirsh Naftali spent on the art, nor whether the purchase occurred before or after her appointment. An ethicist interviewed by the news website said that the purchase was ethically problematic, particularly if it occurred before her appointment, as "it might be perceived as a quid pro quo." The purchases provoked concerns about possible conflicts of interest and a lack of transparency. According to court filings by Biden, between December 2021 and December 2023, he sold approximately $1.5 million (equivalent to $1,866,079 in 2025) of his paintings. From December 2023 to March 2025, he sold $36,000 worth (equivalent to $44,786 in 2025).

His Washington D.C. law license was suspended in 2024, though NBC News reported that it was unclear what impact the suspension would have on his livelihood as he was currently working as an artist. In January 2025, his rental home was damaged and left uninhabitable during the Palisades Fire and he had difficulty finding new housing, resulting in him experiencing homelessness. By this point, he was several million dollars in debt and his income severely impacted by flagging interest in his memoir, which was selling less than 200 copies per month. In court filings, Biden averred that he had anticipated earning money from invitations for paid speaking engagements, but no such invitations had materialized. In April 2025, Biden consented to disbarment in Washington D.C. in order to avoid disbarment proceedings over his criminal convictions.

In March 2025, Hunter's Secret Service detail was withdrawn on the direction of Donald Trump. Prior to the end of his term, Joe Biden had ordered an extended period of post-presidency protection for Hunter. In August 2025, Melania Trump sent a letter demanding that Biden retract statements he made about her, Donald Trump, and Jeffrey Epstein during an interview earlier that month with Channel 5 with Andrew Callaghan. Biden had attributed the information to journalist Michael Wolff. In a subsequent interview, Biden refused to apologize or retract his statements.

In December 2025, Waterbury, Connecticut based Judge Trial Referee Patrick L. Carroll III disbarred Biden from the Connecticut bar, which Biden entered in 1997 a year after he graduated from Yale Law School, after finding that Biden violated state's attorney conduct rules.

Biden began work in August 2025 as the development director for the nonprofit group BASTA Universal, which he described as "the leading homeless prevention and tenants' rights group in southern Los Angeles"

In July 2026, Biden talked with far-right influencer Nick Fuentes on an episode of Channel 5 with Andrew Callaghan. Callaghan's publicist, Mitchell Jackson, said that Biden wanted to sit with Fuentes because of Fuentes' influence: "The way he explained it was that he wanted to speak with Nick because Nick is one of the most influential people with young men in America. Which is true."

In September 2026, Biden launched a meme coin called $LAPTOP at $37.26 a token; during the launch date, it quickly rose to over $222 before plummeting to $1.34. Bubblemaps, a blockchain analytics service, estimated roughly 80 percent of $LAPTOP buyers lost money.

== Personal life ==
=== Relationships ===
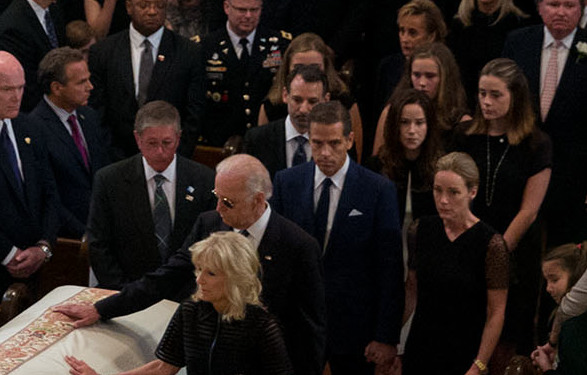
Biden (center) with family at his brother Beau's funeral in June 2015

In 1993, Biden married Kathleen Buhle. They have three daughters: Naomi (named after Biden's sister), Finnegan, and Maisey. The couple formally separated in October 2015, and divorced in 2017. Buhle's 2022 memoir If We Break documents her account of the relationship. In 2016, Biden began a relationship with his brother's widow, Hallie Olivere Biden. The relationship ended in 2019.

Between 2017 and 2018, Biden had relationships with Zoë Kestan and Lunden Alexis Roberts. The relationship with Roberts resulted in the birth of Biden's fourth daughter, in August 2018. Biden initially denied that the child was his, but a DNA test, conducted as part of a paternity suit filed in May 2019 by Roberts, confirmed he is the father. The lawsuit was settled in March 2020 after Biden agreed to pay Roberts $20,000 a month in child support (equivalent to $25,643 in 2025). Biden filed a motion in September 2022 to reduce his child support payments, on the basis of reduced income; Roberts opposed this request and also petitioned the Arkansas court to change the child's surname to Biden, so that his daughter might benefit from associations with Biden's family. Biden and Lunden Roberts reached a settlement in June 2023 in which Biden agreed to give several of his paintings to their daughter and pay an undisclosed monthly amount in child support until she turns 18. Biden also agreed to assist with college tuition. Roberts agreed to drop her petition to change their daughter's surname. As of December 2024, Biden has not met his daughter with Roberts in-person, and has only met with her virtually. In December 2024, Biden stopped the virtual meetings, which Lunden Roberts believes was in response to her publishing a memoir about her relationship with him.

Biden married South African filmmaker Melissa Cohen in May 2019, within a week of first meeting her. Their son, named Beau in honor of Biden's brother, was born in March 2020 in Los Angeles.

=== Drug and alcohol abuse ===
Biden has abused drugs and alcohol throughout his adult life, which he has detailed in his 2021 memoir. He believes his addiction issues are linked to episodes of family loss he suffered, beginning with the 1972 motor vehicle accident that killed his mother and sister. Biden said that his family never talked much with him about the accident, and this allowed the emotional trauma he felt to remain unresolved; it worsened following the death of his brother, Beau. Over the past two decades, Biden has been in multiple substance abuse rehabilitation programs, each followed by an interval of sobriety followed by relapse. At his worst, Biden stated that he was "smoking crack every 15 minutes". The $11 million (equivalent to $14.9 million in 2025) Biden and his firm were paid from 2013 to 2018 fueled his addiction. In his memoir, he wrote that the money "turned into a major enabler during my steepest skid into addiction" and "hounded me to spend recklessly, dangerously, destructively. Humiliatingly. So I did." He had an intervention in early 2019.

=== Memoir ===
Biden released Beautiful Things, a memoir of the trauma of the accident that claimed his mother and sister, and his later addiction struggles, on April 6, 2021. The New York Times described the book as "equal parts family saga, grief narrative and addict's howl". In his memoir, Biden claims to have no memory of Lunden Roberts, with whom he has a daughter. Roberts characterized the claim as "the greatest public gaslighting of all time".
