= Kathleen Buhle =

American writer

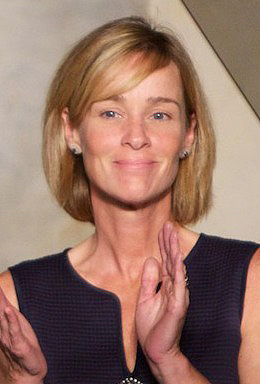
- Buhle in 2014
- Born: Kathleen Anne Buhle c. 1969 (age 56–57); Chicago, Illinois, U.S.
- Other name: Kathleen Biden
- Education: Saint Mary's University of Minnesota
- Occupations: Writer; lobbyist; investment manager; non-profit executive
- Organization: The House at 1229
- Spouse: Hunter Biden (m. 1993; div. 2017)
- Children: 3

Kathleen Anne Buhle (born c. 1969), formerly known as Kathleen Biden, is an American writer and non-profit executive. She is the founder and CEO of the non-profit organization The House at 1229. Buhle is the author of the 2022 memoir If We Break: A Memoir of Marriage, Addiction, and Healing, which details her life while married to Hunter Biden, a son of 46th U.S. president Joe Biden.

== Early life and education ==
Kathleen Anne Buhle was born in Chicago, Illinois, into a middle-class Catholic family. Her mother, Roberta Buhle, was a schoolteacher and her father James F. Buhle was a salesman for the Chicago White Sox. She was educated in Catholic schools and graduated from Saint Mary's University of Minnesota, with a degree in psychology.

== Career and marriage ==
Buhle worked as a high school guidance and admissions counselor. In July 1992, (at age 23) she met Hunter Biden, son of then-senator Joe Biden and Neilia Hunter Biden, while the two were working as Jesuit volunteers at a Catholic church in Portland, Oregon. Buhle and Biden began a relationship a few months after meeting, and she became pregnant three months into their relationship.

They married in July 1993, and she gave birth to their first daughter, Naomi King Biden, on December 21, 1993. Biden and Buhle moved to Washington, D.C., where her husband was a law student at Georgetown University. The family later settled in Wilmington, Delaware, and, in 1997, bought an estate dating back before the American Revolution. Buhle's brother-in-law, Beau Biden, moved in with them while he worked as a federal prosecutor in Philadelphia. On September 9, 2000, she gave birth to their second daughter, Finnegan James Biden, and in 2001 she gave birth to their third daughter, Roberta Mabel "Maisy" Biden. The family moved back to Washington, D.C., and rented a house in Tenleytown. When her father-in-law and step-mother-in-law Jill Biden were respectively serving as vice president and second lady of the United States, Buhle became close friends with First Lady Michelle Obama.

In 2015, Buhle and Biden formally separated due to Biden's infidelity, alcoholism and drug addictions. Buhle requested that Hunter Biden leave their family home on July 5, 2015. On December 9, 2016, Buhle filed for a divorce, and on February 23, 2017, she filed a motion in the Superior Court of the District of Columbia, seeking to freeze Biden's assets. After initially being "messy" the divorce was finalized amicably later that year. In 2019, she formally changed her surname from Biden back to her maiden name, Buhle.

She authored her memoir titled If We Break about her marriage to Biden and his drug addiction. The book came out in June 2022.

Buhle founded the non-profit organization The House at 1229, a women's club to assist people in need in Washington, D.C. Buhle works as the CEO of the organization.

== Personal life ==
Buhle lives in Washington, D.C.

In 2019, Buhle was diagnosed with colon cancer. By 2022, she was cancer-free.
