= Kevin Morris (businessman) =

American lawyer, producer, and writer (born 1963)

- Born: Patrick Kevin Morris; 17 July 1963 (age 62); Philadelphia, Pennsylvania, U.S.
- Education: Cornell University (B.A., Government, 1985); London School of Economics (exchange); New York University School of Law (J.D., 1988)
- Occupations: Lawyer; businessman; producer; author
- Years active: 1988–present
- Known for: Co-founder of Morris Yorn Entertainment Law Firm; brokering South Park; producing Hands on a Hard Body; co-producing the Tony Award–winning Broadway musical The Book of Mormon
- Spouse: Gabrielle Morgerman (m. 1991)
- Children: 2
- Awards: Tony Award (co-producer of The Book of Mormon)

Patrick Kevin Morris (born July 17, 1963) is an American lawyer, businessman, producer, and author.

== Education ==
Morris was raised in suburban Philadelphia in a family of Irish Catholic extraction. He graduated from Cornell University in 1985 with a B.A. in Government and spent a semester at the London School of Economics. He attended law school at New York University, where he received a J.D. in 1988. He later said he had studied law "because I wanted to know what the rules were, so I could break them."

== Career ==
Morris was co-founder and managing partner of the Morris Yorn Entertainment Law Firm, now known as Yorn Levine Barnes Krintzman Rubenstein Kohner Endlich & Gellman since Morris left the practice in 2021. The firm represents or has represented such major American media figures such as Trey Parker and Matt Stone, Matthew McConaughey, Mike Judge, Ellen DeGeneres, Scarlett Johansson, Zoe Saldaña, Liam Hemsworth, Zach Galifianakis, Chris Rock, and Laura Linney.

He produced the 1997 documentary film Hands on a Hard Body, and co-produced the Broadway musical The Book of Mormon for which he won a Tony Award by Trey Parker and Matt Stone. He is known for brokering the TV show South Park, created by Parker and Stone.

His articles on media and entertainment have appeared in The Wall Street Journal, Los Angeles Times, and Filmmaker Magazine. His first collection of short stories, White Man's Problems, was released by Grove Atlantic's Black Cat imprint in January 2015, while his first novel, All Joe Knight, was published by Grove Atlantic in December 2016.

== Hunter Biden ==
In 2024, it came to light that Morris had passed more than $6.5 million to Hunter Biden, son of president Joe Biden, in the form of loans, payment for artwork, and favors. Morris paid more than $875,000 for Hunter Biden's artwork and gave him flights on his private jet. After Morris testified in front of the House Committee on Oversight and Accountability, there were calls for his disbarment and further investigation.

The New York Times reported in May 2022 that Morris met Hunter Biden at a December 2019 fundraiser for the presidential campaign of Biden's father, Joe Biden. The younger Biden was at the time under federal criminal investigation for his tax matters and dealing with personal struggles. Morris became a confidant to Hunter Biden, lending him more than $2 million to cover family expenses and pay back taxes.

Morris was questioned in a closed-door interview by the Comer investigation of the Biden family on January 18, 2024. The interview transcript was not immediately released, but Comer later that day said in a statement that Morris's financial relationship with Biden "raises ethical and campaign finance concerns," alleging it was intended to "insulate then-presidential candidate Joe Biden from political liability." Comer continued, "Morris admitted he has 'loaned' the president's son at least $5 million. These 'loans' don't have to be repaid until after the next presidential election and the 'loans' may ultimately be forgiven." Morris's attorney quickly wrote Comer that the statement contained several inaccuracies, asserting that the loans were reviewed by attorneys for both men and included "proper loan terms such as interest and a term." The attorney wrote that Morris repeatedly testified he fully expected the loans to be repaid and did not say they would be forgiven. Morris's attorney Bryan Sullivan wrote Comer that at the start of his client's testimony he had "specifically pointed out the practice of Republicans in making partial leaks of witness' statements rather than releasing the actual transcript so the public would know the truth and not your often inaccurate spin and misstatements." In a statement, Morris said, "Here's what they do: They bring up something totally innocuous and legal, get nowhere with it, and they run to the cameras and make spooky noises. What they do has an elementary school quality to it." A committee spokesperson said the transcript would support Comer's statement upon its later release.

== Personal life ==
At Cornell, he played for the junior varsity basketball team as a walk-on, was president of the Sigma Pi fraternity chapter, and a Cornell Tradition Scholar. After graduating from law school at NYU, Morris moved to Los Angeles. where he began his career in entertainment law by handling the contracts of independent filmmakers before founding Morris Yorn Barnes & Levine in 1995.

He married Gabrielle "Gaby" Morgerman in 1991. They have two children and live in the Greater Los Angeles Area.

== Writing ==
Morris has written articles on media and entertainment for The Wall Street Journal, the Los Angeles Times, Filmmaker Magazine, and The Jerusalem Post. He has also written reviews and criticism for The Huffington Post.

In 2014, he published White Man's Problems, a collection of short stories. Kirkus Reviews called it a "mordantly funny take on a modern predicament."

In 2016, Morris published a novel, All Joe Knight, which was long-listed for the Center for Fiction First Novel Prize, and named as the Amazon Best Book of the Month in Literature and Fiction for December 2016. USA Today called it "a two-fisted debut novel" while Esquire called it "a remarkable and agonizing portrayal of a middle-aged man who doesn't know what's become of his life, and doesn't seem to care."
