= Beautiful Things (memoir) =

2021 memoir by Hunter Biden

- First edition cover
- Author: Hunter Biden
- Audio read by: Hunter Biden
- Language: English
- Subject: Memoir
- Publisher: Gallery Books
- Publication date: April 6, 2021
- Publication place: United Kingdom
- Media type: Print (hardcover), e-book, audiobook
- Pages: 272
- ISBN: 978-1-9821-5111-9 (hardcover)

Beautiful Things: A Memoir is a 2021 memoir by American lawyer and businessman Hunter Biden, who is the second son of U.S. President Joe Biden and his first wife, Neilia Hunter Biden. It was published on April 6, 2021, by Gallery Books, an imprint of Simon & Schuster. In The New York Times reviewer Elisabeth Egan described the book as "equal parts family saga, grief narrative and addict's howl".

== Synopsis ==
In Beautiful Things, Hunter Biden writes about his family and recounts his history of substance abuse and path to sobriety. He discusses the grief and trauma he experienced following the death of his brother, Beau Biden, and the 1972 car accident in which he was injured and his mother, Neilia, and his sister, Naomi, were killed. He also defends his time on the board of the Ukrainian company Burisma.

Biden told CBS that his cocaine addiction reached a zenith in 2015 after the death of his brother.

== Publication and promotion ==
Beautiful Things was published in hardcover and e-book formats on April 6, 2021, by Gallery Books, an imprint of Simon & Schuster. An audiobook, narrated by Biden, was released the same day.

Biden promoted the book with a series of media appearances, including a CBS Sunday Morning interview by Tracy Smith and a CBS This Morning interview by Anthony Mason. He also appeared on Jimmy Kimmel Live! and WTF with Marc Maron.

The book debuted at number four on The New York Times nonfiction best-seller list for the week ending April 10, 2021. It also ranked number 130 on the Amazon Best Sellers and sold 10,000 copies in its first week.

== Reception ==
Marianne Szegedy-Maszak of The Washington Post called it "at once harrowing, relentless and a determined exercise in trying to seize his own narrative from the clutches of the Republicans and the press." Seija Rankin of Entertainment Weekly praised Biden's "raw" depiction of addiction; Rankin, however, believed the book's narrative felt rushed and included unnecessary details that felt scripted.
