= Synchronous (electric vehicle) =

Synchronous is an electric car concept by Ukrainian company Electric Marathon International.

== History ==
According to the statement of CEO Electric Marathon International Andriy Bilyi, the development of the prototype took about one year – from 2015 till 2016. The development works were also joint by the Ukrainian partners, a design agency SkyRye (Kyiv) and an engineering company Eco-Factor (Odesa). Company E-Line» (Dnipro) developed the charging station specially for the model Synchronous.

In April 2016 the functional prototype of Synchronous was first introduced at the international conference dedicated to the eco-friendly transport and renewable energy sources EVER 2016. In May 2016 the electric vehicle was presented in Kyiv.

The prototype is designed in retro-futurism style. According to the designer Vladyslav Karpets, it was initially agreed to make it look like a vintage carriage.

Synchronous was created as a municipal taxi, a hotel shuttle or an excursion car.

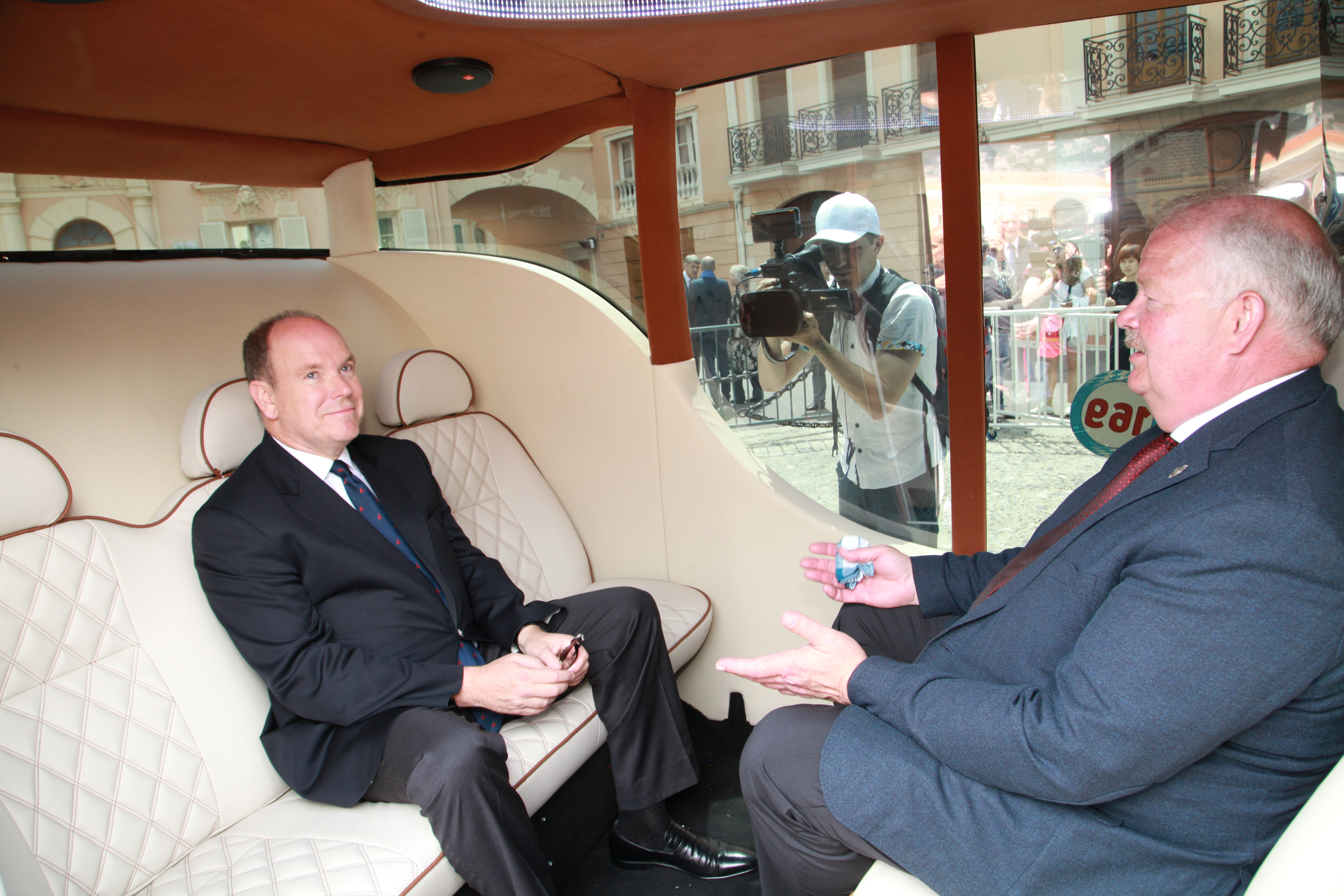
Prince Albert II of Monaco and the Honorary Consul of Monaco in Estonia Jüri Tamm inside Synchronous, Monaco, June 2016

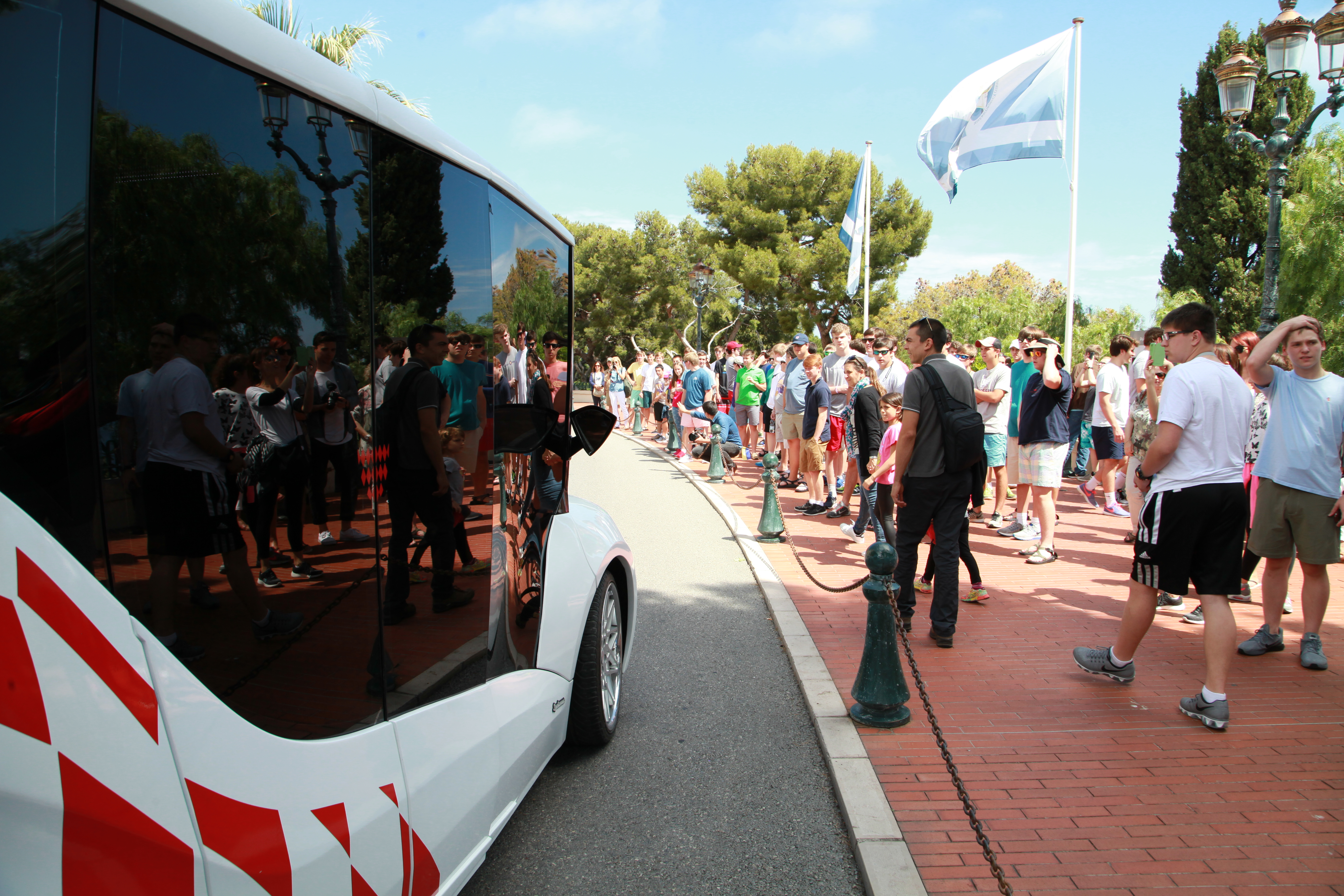
Synchronous in Monaco, June 2016

According to several media sources, Synchronous is the first electric car prototype fully developed and assembled in Ukraine

The body of the car is made of fiberglass. Vehicles length, width and height are 4490x2100x2200 mm. The electric vehicle has an asynchronous front axle engine, charged by Lithium-ion accumulator. The car has 19-inch disks, rear view camera, air conditioner with autonomous charging from solar panel located on top of the car's roof and a multimedia system. Six passengers can be inside the car, the driver has a separated glass cabin.

In May–June 2016 the concept of Synchronous electric vehicle took part in trans-European electric rally Electric Marathon 2016 Lviv Monte Carlo. Together with other participants the electric car visited such cities and towns as Lviv, Novoyavorivsk (Ukraine), Rzeszow, Wieliczka (Poland), Ostrava, Brno (Czech Republic), Samorin (Slovakia), Wiener-Neustadt, Forchdorf, Bad-Schallerbach (Austria), Munich, Ulm, Baden-Baden, Freiburg (Germany), Beckenried, Bellinzona (Switzerland), Parma, Bologna, Larderello, Pisa, Alassio (Italy), Menton (France) and Monte Carlo (Monaco).
