= Electric Marathon =

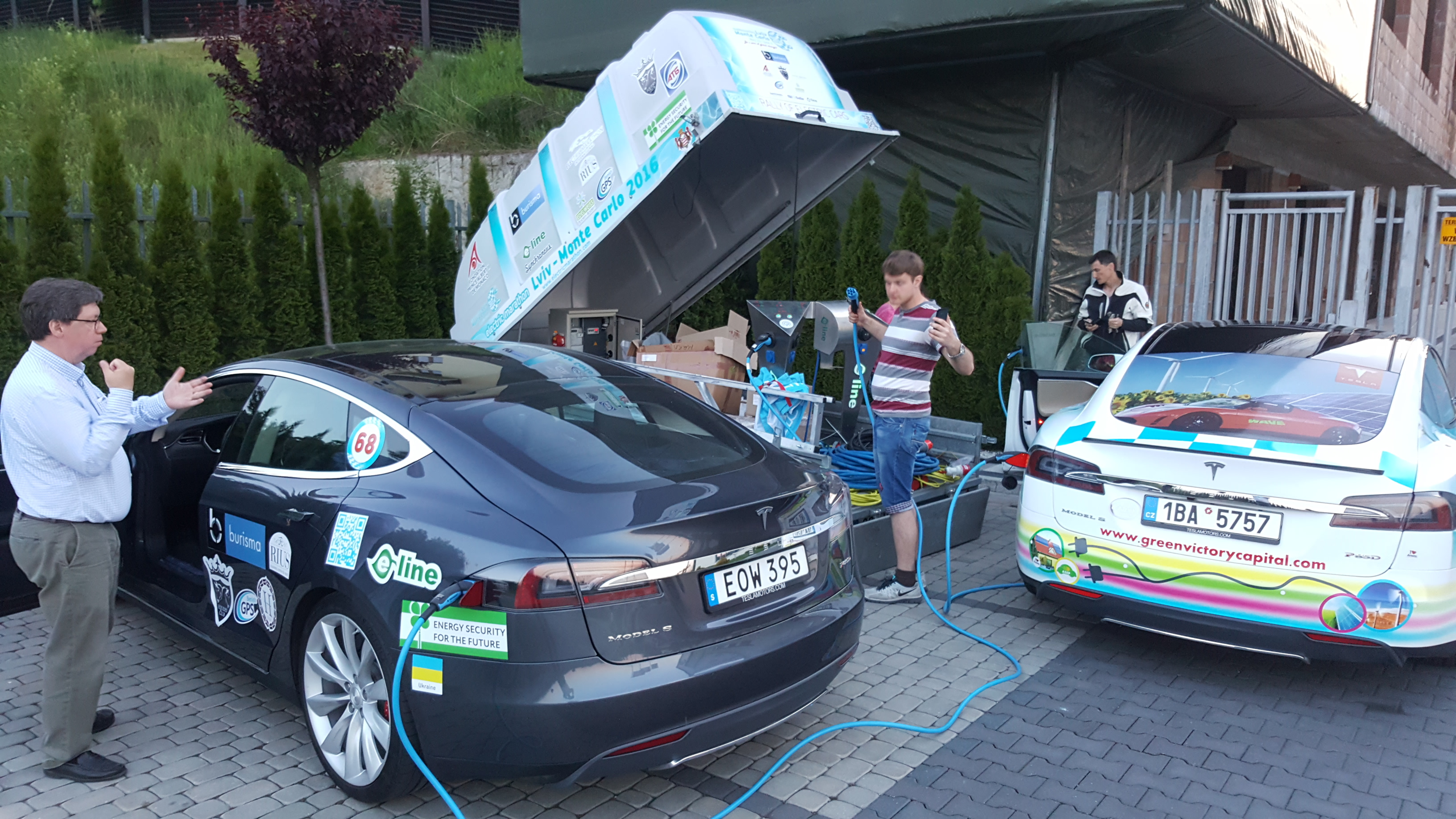
Charging point on the marathon

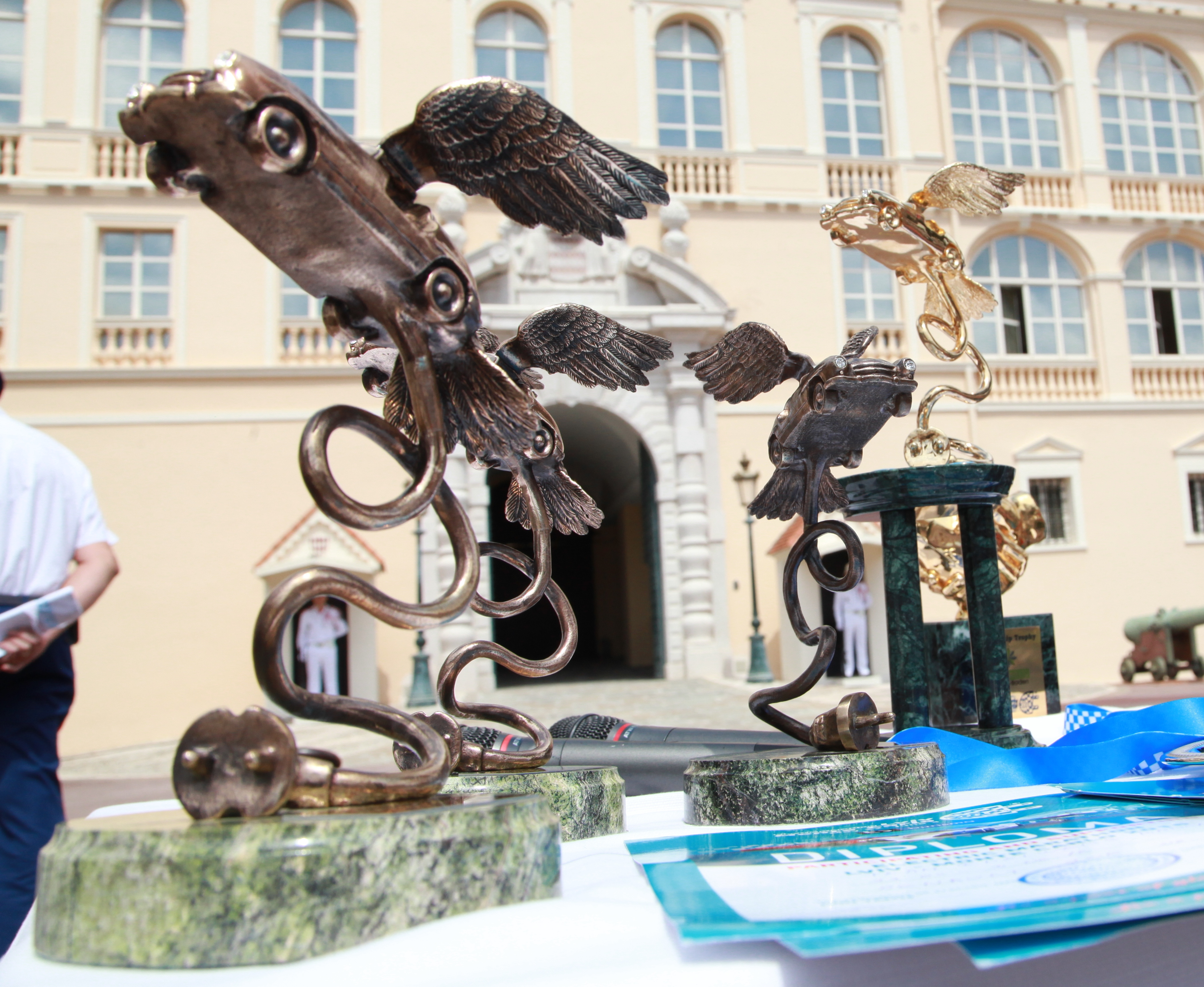
Awards of the winners of Electric Marathon

"Electric Marathon" — an annual rally that was initiated in 2011. Any electric vehicle can take part at any stage of the marathon. Any electric vehicle, that has official registration and is allowed to use on public roads, can participate.

Along with electric cars electric bicycles, scooters, electric quadracycles can also participate.

Besides, during the official ceremonies the Marathon is symbolically supported by other electric vehicles – trams, trolleybuses, electric buses, etc.

The mission declared by Electric Marathon is to attract attention of European and world's public to the environmental issues, to popularise vehicles with zero emission, as well as to facilitate the creation of electric vehicles service infrastructure in Europe.

The conduction of Electric Marathon is accompanied by an official and public events: meetings with local authorities, environment protection conferences, artistic contests, etc. Thus, for instance, in 2016 a special international forum on energy safety Energy Security for the Future: New sources, Responsibility, Sustainability has been organised by Electric Marathon International, Honorary Consul of Monaco in Estonia and Prince Albert II of Monaco Foundation during the final day of the Marathon. The forum was attended by world level politicians, representatives of business circles and public actors.

== Overall regulations ==
The following vehicle types can participate in the rally:

- Mass-produced vehicles with electric engines;
- Converted, modified and prototypes of vehicles with electric engines;
  Platform for charging the electric cars
- Electric bikes.

Electric Marathon is an "intellectual rally". It is conducted on the public roads, and the winner is defined not by the speed or time, but by the accuracy of timing and navigation, the reliability of the vehicle on long and complicated distances. An ideal time is set by the so-called "zero" car, and the winner is that crew that shows the time nearest to the ideal time. During the rally, all participants have to follow the traffic rules.

Electric Marathon's patron is His Serene Highness Prince Albert II of Monaco. The rally is also conducted in co-operation with Prince Albert II of Monaco Foundation represented by its Vice-president Bernard Fautrier.

== History ==
The first Electric Marathon became the symbolic restoration of the traditions of Star Race rally Tallinn – Monte Carlo, that took place between 1930 and 1939. The idea of the marathon belongs to Prince Albert II of Monaco and Honorary Consul of Estonia Jüri Tamm. As a result, the rally was reborn in new format and became the race for electric and hybrid vehicles.

The start of the first Electric Marathon was given in 2011 in Tallinn by Prince of Monaco.

== Route ==
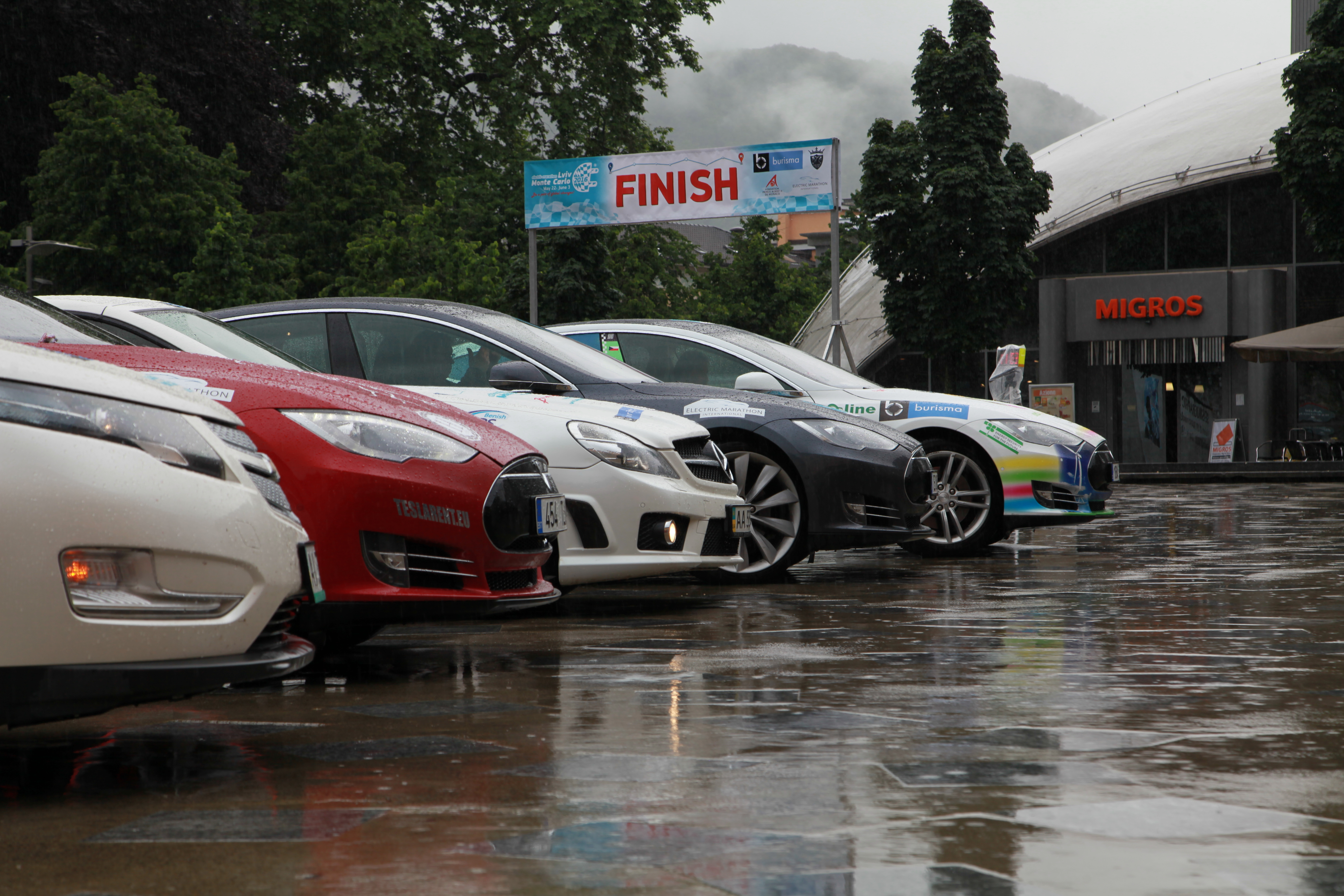
Participants of Electric Marathon 2016 in Bellinzona, Switzerland

In 2011 the rally started in Tallinn and lasted from 3 till 11 June, the participants crossed Estonia, Finland, Sweden, Denmark, Germany, Switzerland, Italy, France and Monaco.

In 2012 it also started in Tallinn, the route covered Estonia, Latvia, Lithuania, Poland, Czech Republic, Slovakia, Austria, Slovenia, Italy, France and Monaco

In 2013 marathon started in St. Petersburg, crossed Estonia, Latvia, Lithuania, Poland, Czech Republic, Germany, Switzerland, Italy, France and Monaco

In 2015 the official ceremony of the start of Electric Marathon took place in Kyiv. The route covered Ukraine, Poland, Czech Republic, Slovakia, Austria, Slovenia, Italy, France and Monaco.

In 2016 Lviv became the start point of the rally. The participants of the race visited such cities and towns as Lviv and Novoyavorivsk (Ukraine), Rzeszow and Wieliczka (Poland), Ostrava and Brno (Czech Republic), Samorin (Slovakia), Wiener-Neustadt, Vorchdorf and Bad Schallerbach (Austria), Munich, Ulm, Baden-Baden and Freiburg (Germany), Beckenried and Bellinzona (Switzerland), Parma, Bologna, Larderello, Pisa and Alassio (Italy), Menton (France) and Monte Carlo (Monaco). Altogether 82 electric and hybrid cars from 10 European countries participated in the rallies.

In 2018 the official ceremony of the start of Electric Marathon took place in Tallinn. The event official name was Tallsinki - Monte-Carlo Electric Marathon 2018 and began from Tallsinki (capitals of Finland and Estonia) and ends in Monte-Carlo (Monaco), along the roads of Finland, Estonia, Latvia, Lithuania, Russia, Poland, Germany, Luxemburg, France, Monaco - through Europe from North to the South, from Baltic Sea to Mediterranean Sea. The Event will be held between September 17- 29th 2018.

2019 rally started from Monte Carlo and lead the participants to St. Petersburg through Moscow Skolkovo Technopark. The overall length of the marathon was 5000 km and the road went through 10 countries: Monaco > France > Italy > San Marino > Croatia > Hungary > Slovakia > Poland > Belarus > Russia and 29 cities: Monte Carlo > Menton > Genova > Bologna > San Marino > Rimini > Ancona > Split > Smiljan > Zagreb > Nagykanizsa > Zalaegerszeg > Gödöllő > Miskolc > Кosice > Rzheshov > Lublin > Terespol > Brest > Mir > Minsk > Gomel > Vesselovka > Brjansk > Kaluga > Moscow > Tver > Novgorod > St. Petersburg.

== Winners ==
=== Electric cars ===
Year	Pilot / Team	Auto
2011	Kristiina Ojuland (Estonia)	Tesla Roadster
2012	«Olympic Casino» (Estonia)	Tesla Roadster
2013	«Half Danes» (Denmark)	Tesla Model S
2015	«Särtsauto» (Estonia)	Tesla Model S
2016	«Särtsauto» (Estonia)	Tesla Model S
2018	«Särtsauto» (Estonia)	Tesla Model S
2019	«SandFox» (Estonia)	Converted GAZ-M20 Pobeda

== Interesting facts ==
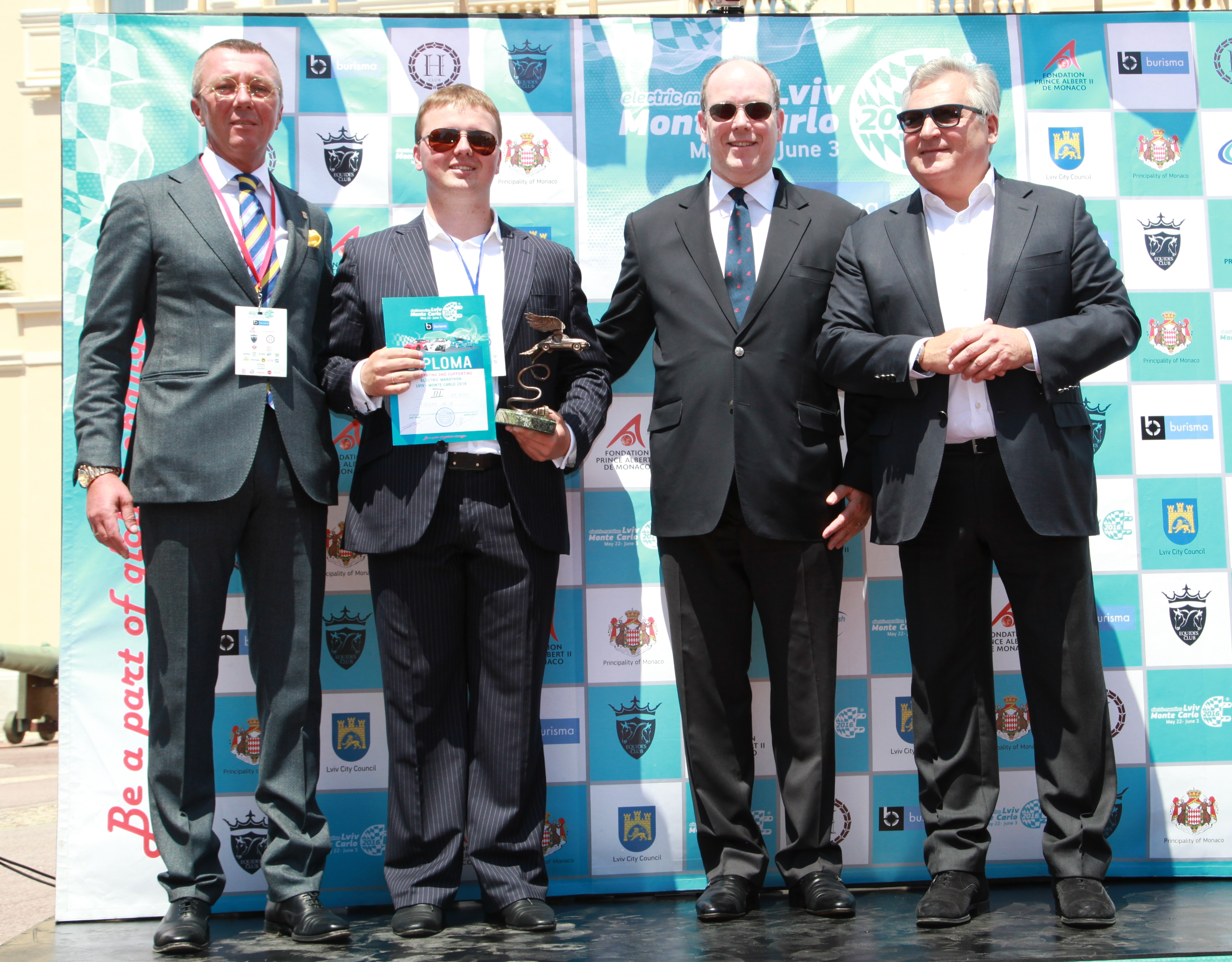
- Andriy Bilyy, Prince Albert II of Monaco and Ex-President of Poland Aleksander Kwasniewski are awarding the winners of Electric Marathon 2016, Plug-In Hybrids category
  Carl Barlev, the captain of Half Danes crew and the winner of Electric Marathon 2013, participated in the rally together with his family – wife and three kids, the youngest child was only 11 months old.
- Andriy Bilyy, vice-president of Electric Marathon, joined the rally in 2011 as a regular driver, and even won the last stage (Cuneo – Monte Carlo) with Tesla Roadster.
- The start of Electric Marathon 2013 was symbolically joined by the copy of lunar ship Lunokhod-1, that was specially delivered from Polytechnics Museum in Moscow. From a technical point of view the first planet-traveller is an electric car.
- In 2013 the Czech crew of Jiri Vlk could not participate in start of the rally in St. Petersburg. Czech team used Dacia Logan, re-equipped with ethanol engine – the border crossing rules of Russian Federation did not allow bringing so much alcohol.
- In 2011 the rally was joined by re-designed GAZ M-20 Pobeda, in 2015 except for that vehicle - there was ZAZ 968 М with an electric engine constructed by an engineer from Odesa Sergey Velchev, as well as self-made vehicle Electra 2 of a Ukrainian inventor Valentyn Herbstein.
- In 2016 Electric Marathon was joined by Synchronous a first electric car prototype fully developed and assembled in Ukraine.
- In 2018 Estonian Postal Service issued special postage stamp dedicated to Electric Marathon.
