= Opinion polling for the 2020 election =

Opinion polling for the 2020 election may refer to:

- Opinion polling for the 2020 New Zealand general election
- Nationwide opinion polling for the 2020 United States presidential election
- Statewide opinion polling for the 2020 United States presidential election
