= 2020 United States presidential election =

Election of Joe Biden

- November 3, 2020 (Note: About 64% of voters voted early before November 3 in person or by mail, with the earliest state starting on September 4.)

538 members of the Electoral College 270 electoral votes needed to win
- Opinion polls
- Turnout: 66.6% (▲6.5 pp) (Note: The Federal Election Commission calculated a voter turnout of 62.8% in 2020, as the votes for president divided by the estimated U.S. population at or over age 18. The denominator included U.S. residents ineligible to vote due to not being U.S. citizens or due to a criminal conviction, and excluded U.S. citizens residing in other countries who were eligible to vote. This turnout was an increase of 7.1pp compared to the turnout of 55.7% in the 2016 election, calculated by the same institution with the same basis. The U.S. Census Bureau calculated a voter turnout of 66.8% in 2020, as the people reporting having voted divided by the estimated U.S. population at or over age 18 who were U.S. citizens. The denominator excluded U.S. residents ineligible to vote due to not being U.S. citizens, but included those ineligible due to a criminal conviction and excluded U.S. citizens residing in other countries who were eligible to vote. This turnout was an increase of 5.4pp compared to the turnout of 61.4% in the 2016 election, calculated by the same institution with the same basis. The U.S. Elections Project calculated a voter turnout of 66.6% in 2020, as the total ballots divided by the estimated population that was eligible to vote. The denominator excluded U.S. residents ineligible to vote due to not being U.S. citizens or due to a criminal conviction, and included U.S. citizens residing in other countries who were eligible to vote. This turnout was an increase of 6.5pp compared to the turnout of 60.1% in the 2016 election, calculated by the same institution with the same basis.)

Nominee	Joe Biden	Donald Trump
Party	Democratic	Republican
Home state	Delaware	Florida (Note: Trump's official state of residence was New York in the 2016 election, but it was changed to Florida when his permanent residence was switched from Trump Tower to Mar-a-Lago in 2019.)
Running mate	Kamala Harris	Mike Pence
Electoral vote	306	232
States carried	25 + DC + NE-02	25 + ME-02
Popular vote	81,283,501	74,223,975
Percentage	51.3%	46.8%
- Presidential election results map. Blue denotes states won by Biden/Harris and red denotes those won by Trump/Pence. Numbers indicate electoral votes cast by each state and the District of Columbia.
President before election
Donald Trump
Republican
Elected President
Joe Biden
Democratic

A presidential election was held in the United States on November 3, 2020. The Democratic ticket of former vice president Joe Biden and California junior senator Kamala Harris defeated the incumbent Republican President Donald Trump and Vice President Mike Pence. The election saw the highest voter turnout by percentage since 1900. Biden received more than 81 million votes, the most votes ever cast for a presidential candidate in U.S. history.

In a competitive primary that featured the most candidates for any political party in the modern era of American politics, Biden secured the Democratic presidential nomination. Biden's running mate, Harris, became the first African American, first Asian American, and third female (Note: The previous two female vice presidential nominees were Geraldine Ferraro in 1984 and Sarah Palin in 2008.) vice presidential nominee on a major party ticket. Trump easily secured re-nomination with only minor opposition in the Republican primaries. Jo Jorgensen secured the Libertarian presidential nomination with Spike Cohen as her running mate, and Howie Hawkins secured the Green presidential nomination with Angela Nicole Walker as his running mate.

The central issues of the election included the public health and economic impacts of the COVID-19 pandemic, civil unrest in reaction to the police murder of George Floyd, the Supreme Court following the death of Ruth Bader Ginsburg and confirmation of Amy Coney Barrett, and the future of the Affordable Care Act. Due to the ongoing pandemic, a record number of ballots were cast early and by mail. Thirty-eight states had over half of all votes cast using these methods, and only three states had fewer than 25%. As a result of a large number of mail-in ballots, some swing states saw delays in vote counting and reporting; this led to major news outlets delaying their projection of Biden and Harris as the president-elect and vice president-elect until the morning of November 7, 2020.

Biden defeated Trump, winning 306 Electoral College votes and 51.3% of the popular vote to Trump's 232 electoral votes and 46.8% of the popular vote. Trump was the first president to lose re-election since George H. W. Bush in 1992. Key to Biden's pivotal victory were his wins in the Democratic-leaning Rust Belt states of Michigan, Pennsylvania, and Wisconsin, which Trump narrowly carried in 2016 and whose combined 46 electoral votes were enough to swing the election to either candidate. This election marked the first time since 1948 that the Democratic candidate won the popular vote in four consecutive elections.

Trump refused to accept the results; he and his allies made disproven claims of fraud, pressured election officials, filed several unsuccessful lawsuits, and directly attempted to overturn the results at the county, state, and federal level. This culminated in an attack on the United States Capitol on January 6, 2021, for which Trump was impeached a second time. The day after the attack, Trump stated that a "new administration" would be succeeding his, without mentioning president-elect Biden by name, in a video posted on Twitter.

== Background ==
The Maine Legislature passed a bill in August 2019 adopting ranked-choice voting (RCV) both for presidential primaries and for the general election. Governor Janet Mills allowed the bill to become law without her signature, which delayed its taking effect until after the 2020 Democratic primary in March and made Maine the first state to use RCV for a presidential general election. The Maine Republican Party filed signatures for a veto referendum to preclude the use of RCV for the 2020 election, but Secretary of State Matthew Dunlap found there were insufficient valid signatures to qualify for the ballot. A challenge in Maine Superior Court was successful for the Maine Republican Party, but the Maine Supreme Judicial Court stayed the ruling pending appeal on September 8, 2020. Nevertheless, ballots began being printed later that day without the veto referendum and including RCV for the presidential election, and the Court ruled in favor of the secretary of state on September 22, allowing RCV to be used. An emergency appeal to the Supreme Court was denied on October 6. The law continues the use of the congressional district method for the allocation of Maine's electors (Nebraska is the only other state that apportions its electoral votes this way). While multiple rounds of vote counting were not needed due to a single candidate receiving a majority of first-choice votes statewide and in each district, use of RCV complicates interpretation of the national popular vote because voters are more likely to vote for third-party or independent candidates.

On December 14, 2020, pledged electors for each candidate, known collectively as the United States Electoral College, gathered in their states' capitols to cast their official votes. Pursuant to the processes laid out by the Electoral Count Act of 1887, certificates of ascertainment listing the names of the electors and separate certificates recording their votes are distributed to various officials across the branches of government. The newly elected Congress, with the vice president in his role as Senate president presiding, met in a joint session to formally open the certificates and count the votes; the session began on January 6, 2021, was interrupted by the January 6 United States Capitol attack, and finished the following day.

== Nominations ==
=== Democratic Party ===
The Democratic Party chose its nominee in the 2020 Democratic Party presidential primaries. Joe Biden became the presumptive nominee of the Democratic Party on April 8, 2020, after senator Bernie Sanders of Vermont withdrew from the race. On June 5, 2020, Biden secured enough delegates to ensure his nomination at the national convention. Biden picked Kamala Harris as his vice-presidential nominee, and the ticket was formally nominated at the convention on August 18.

Democratic Party (United States) 2020 Democratic Party ticket
Joe Biden	Kamala Harris
for President	for Vice President
47th Vice President of the United States (2009–2017)	U.S. Senator from California (2017–2021)
Campaign

=== Republican Party ===
Incumbent president Donald Trump and incumbent vice president Mike Pence were able to easily secure the nomination against former governor of Massachusetts Bill Weld after Trump received enough delegates in the 2020 Republican presidential primaries. They were formally nominated at the Republican National Convention on August 24, 2020. Trump won 2,549 delegates (out of 2,550), one of the most in presidential primary history.

Republican Party (United States) 2020 Republican Party ticket
Donald Trump	Mike Pence
for President	for Vice President
45th President of the United States (2017–2021)	48th Vice President of the United States (2017–2021)
Campaign

=== Libertarian Party ===
Jo Jorgensen, who was the running mate of author Harry Browne in 1996, received the Libertarian nomination at the national convention on May 23, 2020. She achieved ballot access in all 50 states and the District of Columbia.

2020 Libertarian Party ticket
Jo Jorgensen	Spike Cohen
for President	for Vice President
Senior Lecturer at Clemson University	Podcaster and businessman

=== Green Party ===
Howie Hawkins became the presumptive nominee of the Green Party on June 21, 2020, and was officially nominated by the party on July 11, 2020. Hawkins secured ballot access in 29 states and the District of Columbia, representing 381 electoral votes, and write-in access in 16 more states, representing 130 electoral votes. (Note: Although claimed in Hawkins's campaign website, he did not obtain write-in access in Montana.)

2020 Green Party ticket
Howie Hawkins	Angela Walker
for President	for Vice President
Co-founder of the Green Party	ATU Local 998 Legislative Director (2011–2013)

== General election campaigns ==
=== Ballot access ===
Presidential candidate (Note: Candidates in bold were listed on ballots of states representing most of the electoral college. Other candidates were listed on ballots of more than one state and were listed on ballots or were write-in candidates in states representing most of the electoral college.)	Vice presidential candidate (Note: In some states, some presidential candidates were listed with a different or no vice presidential candidate.)	Party or label (Note: In some states, some candidates were listed with a different or additional party, a label, or as independent or unaffiliated.)	Ballot access (including write-in)		
Presidential candidate	Vice presidential candidate	Party or label	States/DC	Electors	Voters
Joe Biden	Kamala Harris	Democratic	51	538	100%
Donald Trump	Mike Pence	Republican	51	538	100%
Jo Jorgensen	Spike Cohen	Libertarian	51	538	100%
Howie Hawkins	Angela Walker	Green	30 (46)	381 (511)	73.2% (95.8%)
Gloria La Riva	Sunil Freeman	Socialism and Liberation	15 (33)	195 (401)	37.0% (76.1%)
Rocky De La Fuente	Darcy Richardson	Reform	15 (25)	183 (289)	34.7% (54.1%)
Don Blankenship	William Mohr	Constitution	18 (30)	166 (305)	31.2% (56.8%)
Brock Pierce	Karla Ballard	Independent	16 (31)	115 (285)	19.1% (50.1%)
Brian Carroll	Amar Patel	American Solidarity	8 (39)	66 (463)	11.4% (87.7%)
Jade Simmons	Claudeliah J. Roze	Becoming One Nation	2 (38)	15 (372)	2.7% (68.9%)

=== Party conventions ===
Democratic Party
Republican Party
Libertarian Party (virtual)
Green Party (virtual)

The 2020 Democratic National Convention was originally scheduled for July 13–16 in Milwaukee, Wisconsin, but was delayed to August 17–20 due to the effects of the COVID-19 pandemic. On June 24, 2020, it was announced that the convention would be held in a mixed online in-person format, with most delegates attending remotely but a few still attending the physical convention site. On August 5, the in-person portion of the convention was scaled down even further; major speeches, including Biden's, were switched to a virtual format.

The 2020 Republican National Convention took place from August 24–27 in Charlotte, North Carolina, and various remote locations. Originally, a three-day convention was planned to be held in North Carolina, but due to North Carolina's insistence that the convention follow COVID-19 social distancing rules, the speeches and celebrations were moved to Jacksonville, Florida (official convention business was still contractually obligated to be conducted in Charlotte). Due to the worsening situation with regards to COVID-19 in Florida, the plans there were cancelled, and the convention was moved back to Charlotte in a scaled-down capacity.

The 2020 Libertarian National Convention was originally scheduled to be held in Austin, Texas, over Memorial Day weekend from May 22 to 25, but all reservations at the JW Marriott Downtown Austin for the convention were cancelled on April 26 due to the COVID-19 pandemic. The Libertarian National Committee eventually decided the party would hold two conventions, one online from May 22–24 to select the presidential and vice-presidential nominees and one at a physical convention in Orlando, Florida, from July 8–12 for other business.

The 2020 Green National Convention was originally to be held in Detroit, Michigan, from July 9 to 12. Due to the COVID-19 pandemic, the convention was instead held online, without a change in date.

=== Issues unique to the election ===
==== Impeachment ====
The House of Representatives voted to impeach Trump on two counts on December 18, 2019. The trial in the Senate began on January 21, 2020, and ended on February 5, resulting in acquittal by the United States Senate.

This is the second time a president has been impeached during his first term while running for a second term. (Note: Andrew Johnson received votes during the 1868 Democratic National Convention, four months after having been impeached.) Trump continued to hold campaign rallies during the impeachment. This is also the first time since the modern presidential primaries were established in 1911 that a president has been subjected to impeachment while the primary season was underway. The impeachment process overlapped with the primary campaigns, forcing senators running for the Democratic nomination to remain in Washington for the trial in the days before and after the Iowa caucuses.

==== Effects of the COVID-19 pandemic ====
States and territories with at least one local, state, or federal primary election date or method of voting altered as of August 5, 2020

Several events related to the 2020 presidential election were altered or postponed due to the ongoing COVID-19 pandemic in the United States and its effects, such as stay-at-home orders and social distancing guidelines by local governments. On March 10, following primary elections in six states, Democratic candidates Joe Biden and Bernie Sanders cancelled planned campaign night events and further in-person campaigning and campaign rallies. On March 12, Trump also stated his intent to postpone further campaign rallies. The 11th Democratic debate was held on March 15 without an audience at the CNN studios in Washington, D.C. Several states also postponed their primaries to a later date, including Georgia, Kentucky, Louisiana, Ohio, and Maryland. As of March 24, 2020, all major-party presidential candidates had halted in-person campaigning and campaign rallies over COVID-19 concerns. Political analysts speculated at the time that the moratorium on traditional campaigning, coupled with the effects of the pandemic on the nation, could have unpredictable effects on the voting populace and possibly, how the election will be conducted.

Some presidential primary elections were severely disrupted by COVID-19-related issues, including long lines at polling places, greatly increased requests for absentee ballots, and technology issues. Due to a shortage of election workers able or willing to work during the pandemic, the number of polling places was often greatly reduced. Most states expanded or encouraged voting by mail as an alternative, but many voters complained that they never received the absentee ballots they had requested.

The March 2020 Coronavirus Aid, Relief, and Economic Security Act included money for states to increase mail-in voting. By May, Trump and his campaign strongly opposed mail-in voting, claiming that it would cause widespread voter fraud, a belief that has been discredited by a number of media organizations. Government response to the impact of the pandemic from the Trump administration, coupled with the differing positions taken by congressional Democrats and Republicans regarding economic stimulus, became a major campaign issue for both parties.

On April 6, the Supreme Court and Republicans in the State Legislature of Wisconsin rebuffed Wisconsin governor Tony Evers's request to move the state's spring elections to June. As a result, the elections, which included a presidential primary, went ahead on April 7 as planned. At least seven new cases of COVID-19 were traced to this election. Voting-rights advocates expressed fear of similar chaos on a nationwide scale in November, recommending states move to expand vote-by-mail options.

On June 20, 2020, Trump's campaign held an in-person rally in Tulsa, Oklahoma, after the Oklahoma Supreme Court ruled that the event could go ahead despite continuing concerns over COVID-19. Attendance at the rally was far lower than expected, being described as a "flop", and it led to a significant worsening of relations between Trump and his campaign manager, Brad Parscale. 7.7 million people watched the event on Fox News, a Saturday audience record for that channel. Three weeks after the rally, the Oklahoma State Department of Health recorded record numbers of cases of COVID-19, and former Republican presidential candidate Herman Cain died of the virus, although it was not confirmed that he caught the disease due to his attendance at the rally.

On October 2, 2020, Trump and First Lady Melania Trump tested positive for SARS-CoV-2 following a positive test from his senior advisor, Hope Hicks, as part of the larger COVID-19 outbreak among White House personnel. Both the president and first lady immediately entered quarantine, which prevented Trump from further campaigning, notably at campaign rallies. Later that day, the President was admitted to Walter Reed National Military Medical Center with a low grade fever, where he was reported to have received an experimental antibody treatment. Trump's diagnosis came only two days after he had shared the stage with Biden at the first presidential debate and raised the possibility that Biden had caught the virus from Trump; Biden tested negative. Trump was discharged from the hospital on October 5.

Trump being diagnosed with COVID-19 was widely seen as having a negative effect on his campaign and shifted the attention of the public back onto COVID-19, an issue which is generally seen as a liability for Trump, due to his response to the COVID-19 pandemic suffering from low approval ratings. Being in quarantine also meant Trump was unable to attend rallies, which were a major part of his campaign. As a result of Trump contracting COVID-19, Biden continued campaigning but temporarily ceased running attack ads against him. On October 12, one week after his discharge from the hospital, Trump resumed in-person rallies. Trump continued to travel to battleground states and hold mass rallies, sometimes two or three in a day. His rallies were criticized for their lack of social distancing or mask wearing, and some polls suggested that voters saw him less favorably for potentially endangering attendees.

==== Foreign interference ====
U.S. officials accused Russia, China, and Iran of trying to influence the 2020 United States elections. On October 4, 2019, Microsoft announced that "Phosphorus", a group of hackers linked to the Iranian government, had attempted to compromise e-mail accounts belonging to journalists, U.S. government officials and the campaign of a U.S. presidential candidate. The American Government owned Voice of America reported in April 2020 that "Internet security researchers say there have already been signs that China-allied hackers have engaged in so-called 'spear-phishing' attacks on American political targets ahead of the 2020 vote." Chinese spokesman Geng Shuang denied the allegations and said he would "hope the people of the U.S. not drag China into its electoral politics".

On February 13, 2020, American intelligence officials advised members of the House Intelligence Committee that Russia was interfering in the 2020 election in an effort to get Trump re-elected. The briefing was delivered by Shelby Pierson, the intelligence community's top election security official and an aide to acting Director of National Intelligence Joseph Maguire. On February 21, The Washington Post reported that, according to unnamed U.S. officials, Russia was interfering in the Democratic primary in an effort to support the nomination of Senator Bernie Sanders. Sanders issued a statement after the news report, saying in part, "I don't care, frankly, who Putin wants to be president. My message to Putin is clear: stay out of American elections, and as president, I will make sure that you do." Sanders acknowledged that his campaign was briefed about Russia's alleged efforts about a month prior. In a February 2020 briefing to the House Intelligence Committee, U.S. intelligence officials warned Congress that Russia was interfering in the 2020 campaign to support Trump's reelection campaign; Trump was angered that Congress had been informed of the threat, and the day after the briefing castigated the acting director of national intelligence, Joseph Maguire, for allowing the briefing to go forward. China and some government-linked Chinese individuals have been accused of interfering in the election to support the candidacy of both Biden and Trump, though whether it is actually doing so is disputed among the intelligence community.

On October 21, threatening emails were sent to Democrats in at least four states. The emails warned, "You will vote for Trump on Election Day or we will come after you." Director of National Intelligence John Ratcliffe announced that evening that the emails, using a spoofed return address, had been sent by Iran. He added that both Iran and Russia are known to have obtained American voter registration data, possibly from publicly available information, and "This data can be used by foreign actors to attempt to communicate false information to registered voters that they hope will cause confusion, sow chaos and undermine your confidence in American democracy." A spokesman for Iran denied the allegation. In his announcement, Ratcliffe said Iran's intent had been "to intimidate voters, incite social unrest, and damage President Trump", raising questions as to how ordering Democrats to vote for Trump would be damaging to Trump. It was later reported that the reference to Trump had not been in Ratcliffe's prepared remarks as signed off by the other officials on the stage; he had added it on his own. On November 18, 2021, the Justice Department charged two Iranian hackers with attempting to intimidate American voters ahead of the 2020 U.S. election by sending threatening emails and spreading false information.

Throughout the election period, several Colombian lawmakers and the Colombian ambassador to the United States issued statements supporting the Trump campaign, which has been viewed as potentially harmful to Colombia–United States relations. On October 26, the U.S. Ambassador to Colombia, Philip Goldberg, requested that Colombian politicians abstain from getting involved in the elections.

The Department of Justice is investigating whether the Trump Victory Committee accepted a $100,000 donation from Malaysian businessman and international fugitive Jho Low, who is accused of being the mastermind behind the multibillion-dollar 1Malaysia Development Berhad scandal involving a Malaysian sovereign wealth fund, 1MDB.

Government officials and American corporate security officers braced for a repeat of 2016's election infrastructure hacking and similar twenty-first century attacks, and in fact conducted what were characterized as preemptive counter-strikes on botnet infrastructure which might be used in large-scale coordination of hacking, and some incidents earlier in the year appeared to foreshadow such possibilities. Nonetheless, after his dismissal, in a December 2020 interview, Chris Krebs, the Trump administration's director of the Cybersecurity and Infrastructure Security Agency (CISA), described monitoring Election Day from CISA's joint command center along with representatives from the military's United States Cyber Command, the National Security Agency (NSA), the Federal Bureau of Investigation (FBI), the United States Secret Service (USSS), the Election Assistance Commission (EAC), representatives of vendors of voting machine equipment, and representatives of state and local governments, as well as his agency's analysis preceding and after that day, saying, "It was quiet. There was no indication or evidence that there was any sort of hacking or compromise of election systems on, before, or after November third." Responding to spurious claims of foreign outsourcing of vote counting as a rationale behind litigation attempting to stop official vote-counting in some areas, Krebs also affirmed that, "All votes in the United States of America are counted in the United States of America."

Acts of foreign interference included Russian state-directed application of computational propaganda approaches, more conventional state-sponsored Internet propaganda, smaller-scale disinformation efforts, "information laundering" and "trading up the chain" propaganda tactics employing some government officials, Trump affiliates, and US media outlets.

==== Trump's potential rejection of election results ====
During the campaign, Trump indicated in Twitter posts, interviews, and speeches that he might refuse to recognize the outcome of the election if he were defeated; Trump falsely suggested that the election would be rigged against him. In July 2020, Trump declined to answer whether he would accept the results, just as he did in the 2016 presidential election, telling Fox News anchor Chris Wallace that "I have to see. No, I'm not going to just say yes. I'm not going to say no." Trump repeatedly claimed that "the only way" he could lose would be if the election was "rigged" and repeatedly refused to commit to a peaceful transition of power after the election. Trump also attacked mail-in voting throughout the campaign, falsely claiming that the practice contains high rates of fraud; at one point, Trump said, "We'll see what happens ... Get rid of the ballots and you'll have a very peaceful—there won't be a transfer, frankly. There will be a continuation." Trump's statements have been described as a threat "to upend the constitutional order". In September 2020, FBI Director Christopher A. Wray, who was appointed by Trump, testified under oath that the FBI has "not seen, historically, any kind of coordinated national voter fraud effort in a major election, whether it's by mail or otherwise".

A number of congressional Republicans insisted they were committed to an orderly and peaceful transition of power, but declined to criticize Trump for his comments. On September 24, the Senate unanimously passed a resolution affirming the Senate's commitment to a peaceful transfer of power. Trump also stated he expected the Supreme Court to decide the election and that he wanted a conservative majority in case of an election dispute, reiterating his commitment to quickly install a ninth justice following the death of Ruth Bader Ginsburg.

==== Election delay suggestion ====
In April 2020, Biden predicted that Trump would try to delay the election, saying he "is gonna try to kick back the election somehow, come up with some rationale why it can't be held". In May, Jared Kushner did not rule out delaying the election, saying "I'm not sure I can commit one way or the other". On July 30, Trump tweeted that "With Universal Mail-In Voting (not Absentee Voting, which is good), 2020 will be the most INACCURATE & FRAUDULENT Election in history" and proposed that the election should be delayed. Asked whether Trump had the relevant authority, Secretary of State Mike Pompeo said "the United States Department of Justice will make that determination." However, only Congress has the power to schedule elections, and the Constitution sets the end of the presidential and vice-presidential terms at January 20, a hard deadline which can only be altered by constitutional amendment. Congress refused to consider Trump's proposal, and the election went ahead as scheduled.

==== Postal voting ====
Chart of July 2020 opinion survey on likelihood of voting by mail in November election, compared to 2016

Postal voting in the United States has become increasingly common, with 25% of voters mailing their ballots in 2016 and 2018. By June 2020, the COVID-19 pandemic was predicted to cause a large increase in mail voting because of the possible danger of congregating at polling places. An August 2020 state-by-state analysis concluded that 76% of Americans were eligible to vote by mail in 2020, a record number. The analysis predicted that 80 million ballots could be cast by mail in 2020—more than double the number in 2016.

The Postal Service sent a letter to multiple states in July 2020, warning that the service would not be able to meet the state's deadlines for requesting and casting last-minute absentee ballots. In addition to the anticipated high volume of mailed ballots, the prediction was due in part to numerous measures taken by Louis DeJoy, the newly installed United States Postmaster General, including banning overtime and extra trips to deliver mail, which caused delays in delivering mail, and dismantling and removing hundreds of high-speed mail sorting machines from postal centers. On August 18, after the House of Representatives had been recalled from its August break to vote on a bill reversing the changes, DeJoy announced that he would roll back all the changes until after the November election. He said he would reinstate overtime hours, roll back service reductions, and halt the removal of mail-sorting machines and collection boxes.

The House of Representatives voted an emergency grant of $25 billion to the post office to facilitate the predicted flood of mail ballots. Although Trump has repeatedly denounced mail voting, he has mailed in ballots due to being in a different state than the one where he votes at the time of the election. In August 2020, Trump conceded that the post office would need additional funds to handle the additional mail-in voting, but said he would block any additional funding for the post office to prevent any increase in balloting by mail.

In the end, an estimated 42 percent of votes were cast by mail across 41 reporting states, approximately 65.6 million ballots out of 154.6 million cast by all methods.

The Trump campaign filed lawsuits seeking to block the use of official ballot dropboxes in Pennsylvania in locations other than an election office, and also sought to "block election officials from counting mail-in ballots if a voter forgets to put their mail-in ballot in a secrecy sleeve within the ballot return-envelope". The Trump campaign and the Republican Party both failed to produce any evidence of vote-by-mail fraud after being ordered by a federal judge to do so.

On Election Day, a judge ordered mail inspectors to search "mail facilities in .... key battleground states" for ballots. The agency refused to comply with the order and nearly 7% of ballots in USPS facilities on Election Day were not processed in time.

==== Federal Election Commission issues ====
The Federal Election Commission, which was created in 1974 to enforce campaign finance laws in federal elections, has not functioned since July 2020 due to vacancies in membership. In the absence of a quorum, the commission cannot vote on complaints or give guidance through advisory opinions. As of May 19, 2020, there were 350 outstanding matters on the agency's enforcement docket and 227 items waiting for action. As of September 1, 2020, Trump had not nominated anyone to fill the FEC vacancies.

==== Supreme Court vacancy ====
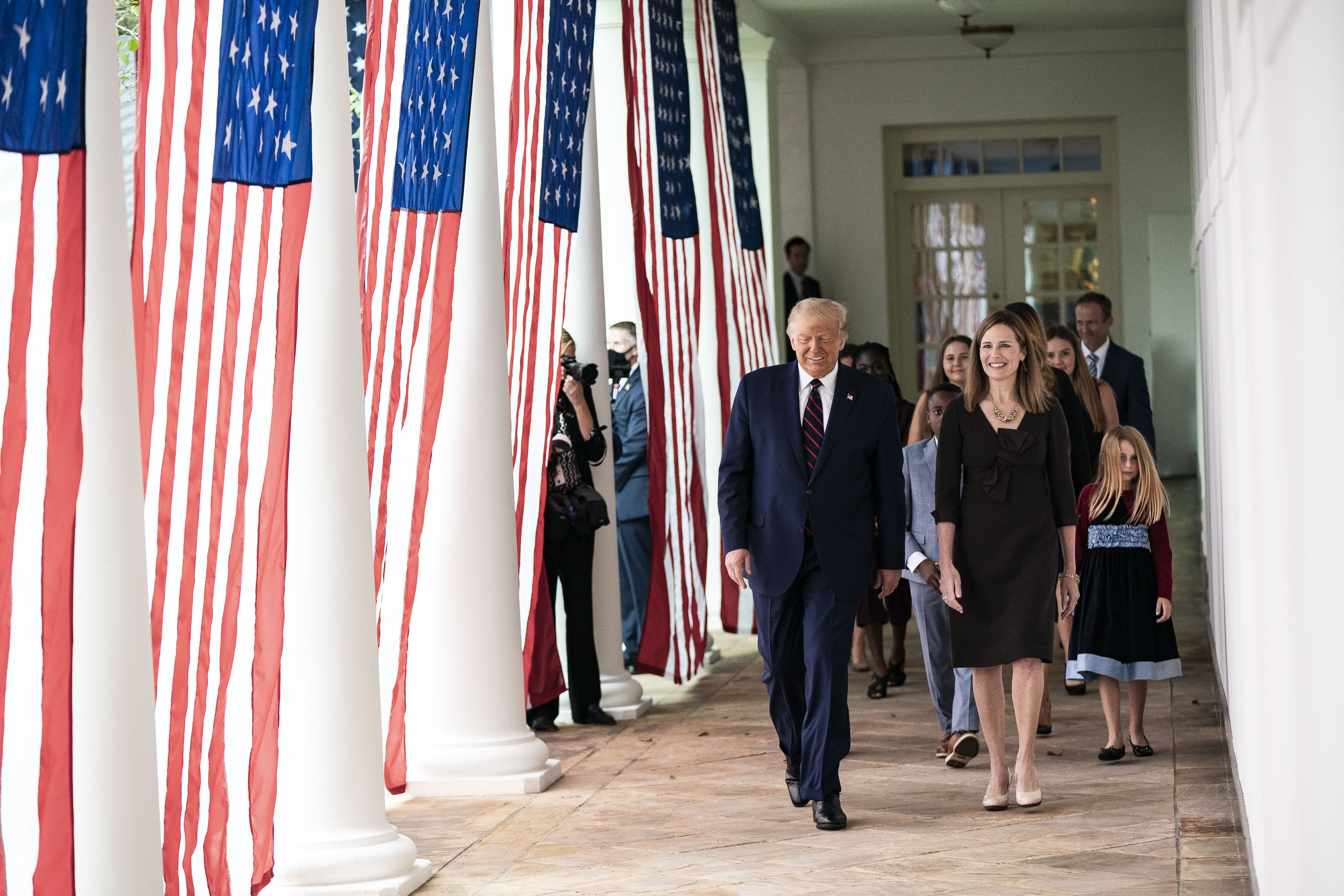
President Donald Trump with Amy Coney Barrett and her family, just prior to Barrett being announced as the nominee, September 26, 2020

On September 18, 2020, Justice Ruth Bader Ginsburg died. Senate Majority Leader Mitch McConnell immediately said the precedent he had set regarding the Merrick Garland nomination was inoperative and that a replacement would be voted on as soon as possible, setting the stage for a confirmation battle and an unexpected intrusion into the campaign. The death of Justice Ginsburg resulted in large increases in momentum for both the Democrats and Republicans. The president, vice president, and several Republican members of Congress said a full Supreme Court bench was needed to decide the upcoming election.

On September 26, the day after Justice Ginsburg's body lay in state at the Capitol, Trump held a Rose Garden ceremony at the White House to announce and introduce his candidate, Amy Coney Barrett. After four days of confirmation hearings, the Senate Judiciary Committee voted the nomination out of committee on October 22, and on October 26, Barrett was confirmed on a party-line vote of 52–48, with no Democrats voting for her confirmation. This was the closest Supreme Court confirmation ever to a presidential election, and the first Supreme Court nomination since 1869 with no supporting votes from the minority party. It was also one of the fastest timelines from nomination to confirmations in U.S. history.

==== Pre-election litigation ====
By September 2020, several hundred legal cases relating to the election had been filed. About 250 of these had to do with the mechanics of voting in relation to the COVID-19 pandemic. The Supreme Court ruled on a number of these cases, primarily issuing emergency stays instead of going through the normal process due to the urgency. In October 2020, there was speculation that the election might be decided through a Supreme Court case, as happened following the 2000 election.

=== Debates ===
Sites of the 2020 general election presidential and vice presidential debates

On October 11, 2019, the Commission on Presidential Debates (CPD) announced that three general election debates would be held in the fall of 2020.

The first, moderated by Chris Wallace, took place on September 29, and was co-hosted by Case Western Reserve University and the Cleveland Clinic in Cleveland, Ohio. The debate was originally to be hosted at the University of Notre Dame in Notre Dame, Indiana, but the university decided against holding the debate as a result of the COVID-19 pandemic. Biden was generally held to have won the first debate, with a significant minority of commentators deeming it a draw.

One exchange that was particularly noted was when Trump did not directly denounce the white supremacist and neo-fascist group Proud Boys, instead responding that they should "stand back and stand by". On the next day, Trump told reporters the group should "stand down" while also claiming that he was not aware of what the group was. The debate was described as "chaotic and nearly incoherent" because of Trump's repeated interruptions, causing the CPD to consider adjustments to the format of the remaining debates.

The vice presidential debate was held on October 7, 2020, at the University of Utah in Salt Lake City. The debate was widely held to be subdued, with no clear victor. One incident that was particularly commented on was when a fly landed on vice-president Pence's head, and remained there unbeknownst to him for two minutes.

The second debate was initially set to be held at the University of Michigan in Ann Arbor, Michigan, but the university withdrew in June 2020, over concerns regarding the COVID-19 pandemic. The planned debate was rescheduled for October 15 at the Adrienne Arsht Center for the Performing Arts in Miami; due to Trump contracting COVID-19, the CPD announced on October 8 that the debate would be held virtually, in which the candidates would appear from separate locations. Trump refused to participate in a virtual debate, and the commission subsequently announced that the debate had been cancelled.

The third scheduled debate took place on October 22 at Belmont University in Nashville, Tennessee, and was moderated by Kristen Welker. The changes to the debate rules, which included the candidates' microphones being muted while the other was speaking, resulted in it being generally considered more civil than the first debate. Welker's performance as moderator was praised, with her being regarded as having done a good job preventing the candidates from interrupting each other. Biden was generally held to have won the debate, though it was considered unlikely to alter the race to any considerable degree.

Debates for the 2020 U.S. presidential election sponsored by the CPD
No.	Date	Time	Host	City	Moderator(s)	Participants	Viewership (millions)
P1	September 29, 2020	9:00 p.m. EDT	Case Western Reserve University	Cleveland, Ohio	Chris Wallace	Donald Trump; Joe Biden	73.1
VP	October 7, 2020	7:00 p.m. MDT	University of Utah	Salt Lake City, Utah	Susan Page	Mike Pence; Kamala Harris	57.9
(P2) (Note: Following the cancellation of the planned second debate on October 9, both candidates held separate but simultaneous televised town hall events on the intended date of October 15. Trump's was broadcast on NBC, moderated by Savannah Guthrie, while Biden's was on ABC, moderated by George Stephanopoulos.)	October 15, 2020	9:00 p.m. EDT	Arsht Center (planned)	Miami, Florida	Steve Scully (planned)	Donald Trump; Joe Biden	N/A
P2	October 22, 2020	8:00 p.m. CDT	Belmont University	Nashville, Tennessee	Kristen Welker	Donald Trump; Joe Biden	63

The Free & Equal Elections Foundation held two debates with various third party and independent candidates, one on October 8, 2020, in Denver, Colorado, and another on October 24, 2020, in Cheyenne, Wyoming.

=== Polling ===
==== Two-way ====
The following graph depicts the standing of each candidate in the poll aggregators from September 2019 to November 2020. Former Vice President Joe Biden, the Democratic nominee, had an average polling lead of 7.9 percentage points over incumbent President Donald Trump, the Republican nominee. Biden would win the national popular vote by 4.4 percentage points.

Polling aggregates
Active candidates
Joe Biden (Democratic)
Donald Trump (Republican)
Others/Undecided

Donald Trump vs. Joe Biden
Source of poll aggregation	Dates administered	Dates updated	Joe Biden	Donald Trump	Other/Undecided (Note: Calculated by taking the difference of 100% and all other candidates combined.)	Margin
270 to Win	Oct 28 – Nov 2, 2020	Nov 2, 2020	51.1%	43.1%	5.8%	Biden +8.0
RealClear Politics	Oct 25 – Nov 2, 2020	Nov 2, 2020	51.2%	44.0%	4.8%	Biden +7.2
FiveThirtyEight	until Nov 2, 2020	Nov 2, 2020	51.8%	43.4%	4.8%	Biden +8.4
Average			51.4%	43.5%	5.1%	Biden +7.9
2020 results			51.3%	46.8%	1.9%	Biden +4.5

==== Four-way ====
Calculated averages are not comparable to those for the Biden vs. Trump polls. As polling with third parties was very limited, the polls included in the average are often different.

Donald Trump vs. Joe Biden vs. Jo Jorgensen vs. Howie Hawkins
Source of poll aggregation	Dates administered	Dates updated	Joe Biden	Donald Trump	Jo Jorgensen	Howie Hawkins	Other/ Undecided	Margin
270 to Win	Oct 23 – Nov 2, 2020	Nov 2, 2020	50.6%	43.2%	1.2%	1.0%	4.0%	Biden +7.4
RealClear Politics	Oct 15 – Nov 2, 2020	Nov 2, 2020	50.6%	43.2%	1.8%	0.8%	3.6%	Biden +7.4
2020 results			51.3%	46.8%	1.1%	0.2%	0.6%	Biden +4.5

==== Swing states ====
The following graph depicts the difference between Joe Biden and Donald Trump in each swing state in the poll aggregators from March 2020 to the election, with the election results for comparison.

Polls by state or district
New Hampshire
Minnesota
Wisconsin
Michigan
Nevada
Pennsylvania
Nebraska CD-2
Maine CD-2
Arizona
Florida
North Carolina
Georgia
Ohio
Texas
Iowa
Montana
Missouri
Alaska
South Carolina
Nebraska
Kansas

View source data.

==== Predictions ====
Publisher	Date	Prediction
2016 result	Nov 8, 2016	D: 232, R: 306
2020 result	Nov 3, 2020	D: 306, R: 232
Cook Political Report	Oct 28, 2020	D: 290, R: 125, Tossup: 123
Inside Elections	Oct 28, 2020	D: 350, R: 125, Tossup: 63
Sabato's Crystal Ball	Nov 2, 2020	D: 321, R: 217, Tossup: 0
Politico	Nov 2, 2020	D: 279, R: 163, Tossup: 96
RealClearPolitics	Oct 29, 2020	D: 216, R: 125, Tossup: 197
CNN	Nov 2, 2020	D: 279, R: 163, Tossup: 96
The Economist	Nov 3, 2020	D: 334, R: 164, Tossup: 40
CBS News	Nov 1, 2020	D: 279, R: 163, Tossup: 96
270toWin	Nov 3, 2020	D: 279, R: 163, Tossup: 96
ABC News	Nov 2, 2020	D: 321, R: 125, Tossup: 92
NPR	Oct 30, 2020	D: 279, R: 125, Tossup: 134
NBC News	Oct 27, 2020	D: 279, R: 125, Tossup: 134
Decision Desk HQ	Nov 3, 2020	D: 308, R: 163, Tossup: 67
FiveThirtyEight	Nov 2, 2020	D: 334, R: 169, Tossup: 35 (Note: Tossup: 50%–59%, Lean: 60%–74%, Likely: 75%–94%, Solid: 95%–100%)

=== Total cost estimate ===
OpenSecrets estimated the total cost of the 2020 election nearly $14 billion, making it the most expensive election in history and twice as expensive as the previous presidential election cycle.

== Campaign issues ==
=== COVID-19 pandemic ===
The COVID-19 pandemic was a major issue of the campaign, with Trump's responses being heavily criticized. The president spread mixed messages on the value of wearing face masks as protection, including criticizing Biden and reporters for wearing them, but has also encouraged their use at times. During the campaign, Trump held many events across the country, including in COVID-19 hotspots, where attendees did not wear masks and were not socially distancing; at the same time, he mocked those who wore face masks.

Biden advocated for the expansion of federal funding, including funding under the Defense Production Act for testing, personal protective equipment, and research. Trump also invoked the Defense Production Act to control the distribution of masks and ventilators, but his response plan relied significantly on a vaccine being released by the end of 2020. At the second presidential debate, Trump claimed Biden had called him xenophobic for restricting entry from foreign nationals who had visited China, but Biden responded that he had not been referring to this decision.

=== Economy ===
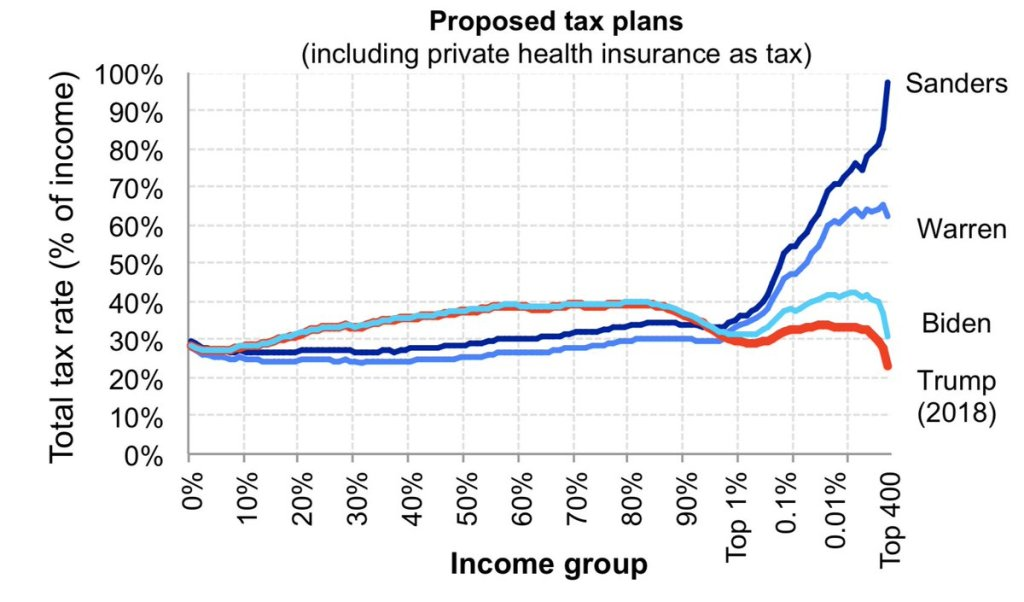
Proposed tax plan payment rates by income group as a percentage of income, including mandatory health insurance

Trump claimed credit for the consistent economic expansion of his presidency's first three years, with the stock market at its longest growth period in history and unemployment at a fifty-year low. Additionally, he has touted the 2020 third-quarter rebound, in which GDP grew at an annualized rate of 33.1%, as evidence of the success of his economic policies. Biden responded to Trump's claims by repeating that the strong economy under Trump's presidency was inherited from the Obama administration, and that Trump has aggravated the economic impact of the pandemic, including the need for 42 million Americans to file for unemployment.

The Tax Cuts and Jobs Act of 2017, which lowered income taxes for many Americans and lowered the corporate tax rate from 35% to 21%, were a major component of Trump's economic policy. Biden and the Democrats generally describe these cuts as unfairly benefiting the upper class. Biden plans to raise taxes on corporations and those making over $400,000 per year, while keeping the reduced taxes on lower-income brackets and raise capital gains taxes to a maximum bracket of 39.6%. In response, Trump said Biden's plans would destroy retirement accounts and the stock market.

=== Environment ===
Trump and Biden's views on environmental policy differ significantly. Trump stated that climate change is a hoax, although he also called it a serious subject. Trump condemned the Paris Agreement on greenhouse gas reduction and began the withdrawal process. Biden planned to rejoin it and announced a $2 trillion plan to combat climate change. Biden had not fully accepted the Green New Deal. Biden did not plan to ban fracking but rather to outlaw new fracking on federal land. In a debate, Trump claimed Biden wanted to ban it altogether. Trump's other environmental policies included the removal of methane emission standards, and an expansion of mining.

=== Health care ===
Health care was a divisive issue in both the Democratic primary campaign and the general campaign. While Biden, as well as other candidates, promised protection of the Affordable Care Act, progressives within the Democratic Party advocated to replace the private insurance industry with Medicare for All. Biden's plan involves adding a public option to the American healthcare system, and the restoration of the individual mandate to buy health care, which was removed from the Affordable Care Act by the 2017 tax cut bill, as well as restoring funding for Planned Parenthood. Trump announced plans to repeal the Affordable Care Act, calling it "too expensive", but he did not say what would replace it. At the time of the election, the Trump administration and Republican officials from 18 states had a lawsuit before the Supreme Court, asking the court to repeal the Affordable Care Act.

=== Racial unrest ===
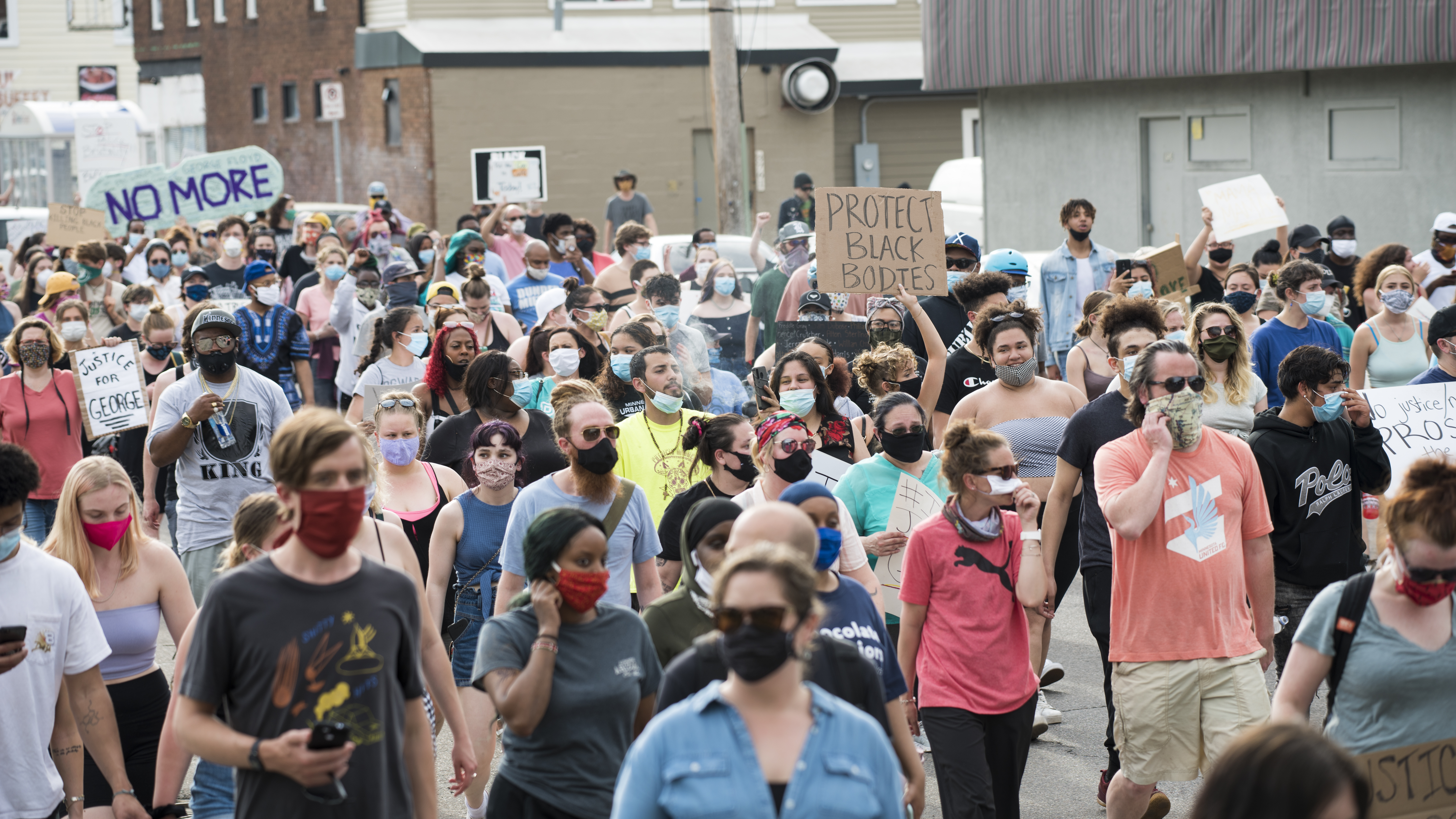
George Floyd protests in Minneapolis on May 26

As a result of the murder of George Floyd and other incidents of police brutality against African Americans, combined with the effects of the COVID-19 pandemic, a series of protests and a wider period of racial unrest erupted in mid-2020. This was followed by the Black Lives Matter movement, which protested police brutality against black people, and became a central point of the 2020 presidential campaign. Protests were mostly peaceful; fewer than 4% involved property damage or violence (with most of the latter directed at BLM protesters themselves). According to a September 2020 estimate, arson, vandalism, and looting caused about $1–2 billion in insured damage between May 26 and June 8, making this initial phase of the George Floyd protests the civil disorder event with the highest recorded damage in United States history.

In response, Trump and the Republicans suggested sending in the military to counter the protests, which was criticized, especially by Democrats, as heavy-handed and potentially illegal. Trump referred to Black Lives Matter protesters confronting diners in a restaurant as "thugs", and called a street painting of the slogan a "symbol of hate". Particularly controversial was a photo-op Trump took in front of St. John's Church in Washington, D.C., before which military police had forcefully cleared peaceful protestors from the area. Biden condemned Trump for his actions against protestors; he described George Floyd's words "I can't breathe" as a "wake-up call for our nation". He also promised he would create a police oversight commission in his first 100 days as president, and establish a uniform use of force standard, as well as other police reform measures.

=== Exit poll ===
2020 presidential election exit poll
Response category	Biden	Trump	% of total vote
Total vote	51	47	100
Trump job approval
Strongly approve	4	96	38
Somewhat approve	20	75	12
Somewhat disapprove	89	7	10
Strongly disapprove	97	1	39
Quality of candidate that mattered most
Has good judgment	68	26	24
Cares about people like me	49	50	21
Can unite the country	75	24	19
Is a strong leader	28	72	11
More important to presidential vote
Candidate's positions on issues	47	53	74
Candidate's personal qualities	64	31	23
Vote for president mainly
For your candidate	46	53	71
Against his opponent	68	30	24
Life for the next generation of Americans will be
Better than today	55	44	54
About the same	40	58	21
Worse than today	52	45	20
View of federal government
Angry	74	24	26
Dissatisfied	67	31	32
Satisfied	29	70	27
Enthusiastic	18	81	13
Decided on presidential vote
Before September	51	46	73
In September	52	45	11
In October	48	49	8
In the last week	31	64	2
In the last few days	49	47	3
Issue regarded as most important
Economy	16	82	35
Racial inequality	92	7	20
COVID-19 pandemic	81	16	17
Crime and safety	27	71	11
Health care	62	37	11
Condition of the nation's economy
Poor	87	10	19
Not so good	76	22	31
Good	24	75	36
Excellent	16	84	13
Family's financial situation today
Better than four years ago	26	72	41
About the same	65	34	39
Worse than four years ago	77	20	20
Racism in the U.S.
The most important problem	87	11	18
An important problem	61	37	51
A minor problem	18	81	18
Not a problem at all	8	91	10
View of Black Lives Matter
Favorable	78	20	57
Unfavorable	14	86	37
Does the country's criminal justice system
Treat Black people unfairly	82	17	53
Treat all people fairly	14	84	40
U.S. efforts to contain coronavirus are going
Very well	13	86	18
Somewhat well	21	78	33
Somewhat badly	74	24	15
Very badly	94	4	32
Has the coronavirus pandemic caused you
Severe financial hardship	69	29	16
Moderate financial hardship	59	39	39
No financial hardship at all	38	60	44
Which is more important to do now
Contain coronavirus	79	19	52
Rebuild the economy	20	78	42
Is wearing a face mask in public more of a
Public health responsibility	64	35	67
Personal choice	24	73	30
Importance of recent rise in coronavirus cases to presidential vote
The most important factor	61	38	23
An important factor	47	51	37
A minor factor	13	86	18
Not a factor at all	7	91	16
Better candidate to handle the coronavirus pandemic
Biden	92	6	53
Trump	4	95	43
How confident that votes will be counted accurately
Very confident	52	47	47
Somewhat confident	56	42	40
Not very confident	34	61	8
Not at all confident	31	66	4
Voting in your state is
Very easy	48	50	69
Somewhat easy	60	39	25
Somewhat difficult	52	46	4
Very difficult	N/A	N/A	2
In vote for president, Supreme Court appointments were
The most important factor	47	51	13
An important factor	54	45	47
A minor factor	51	48	18
Not a factor at all	49	49	19
On Obamacare, should the Supreme Court
Keep it as it is	80	18	51
Overturn it	21	78	44
Abortion should be
Legal in all cases	80	18	25
Legal in most cases	68	30	26
Illegal in most cases	27	72	25
Illegal in all cases	18	81	17
Climate change is a serious problem
Yes	69	29	67
No	15	84	30

== Results ==
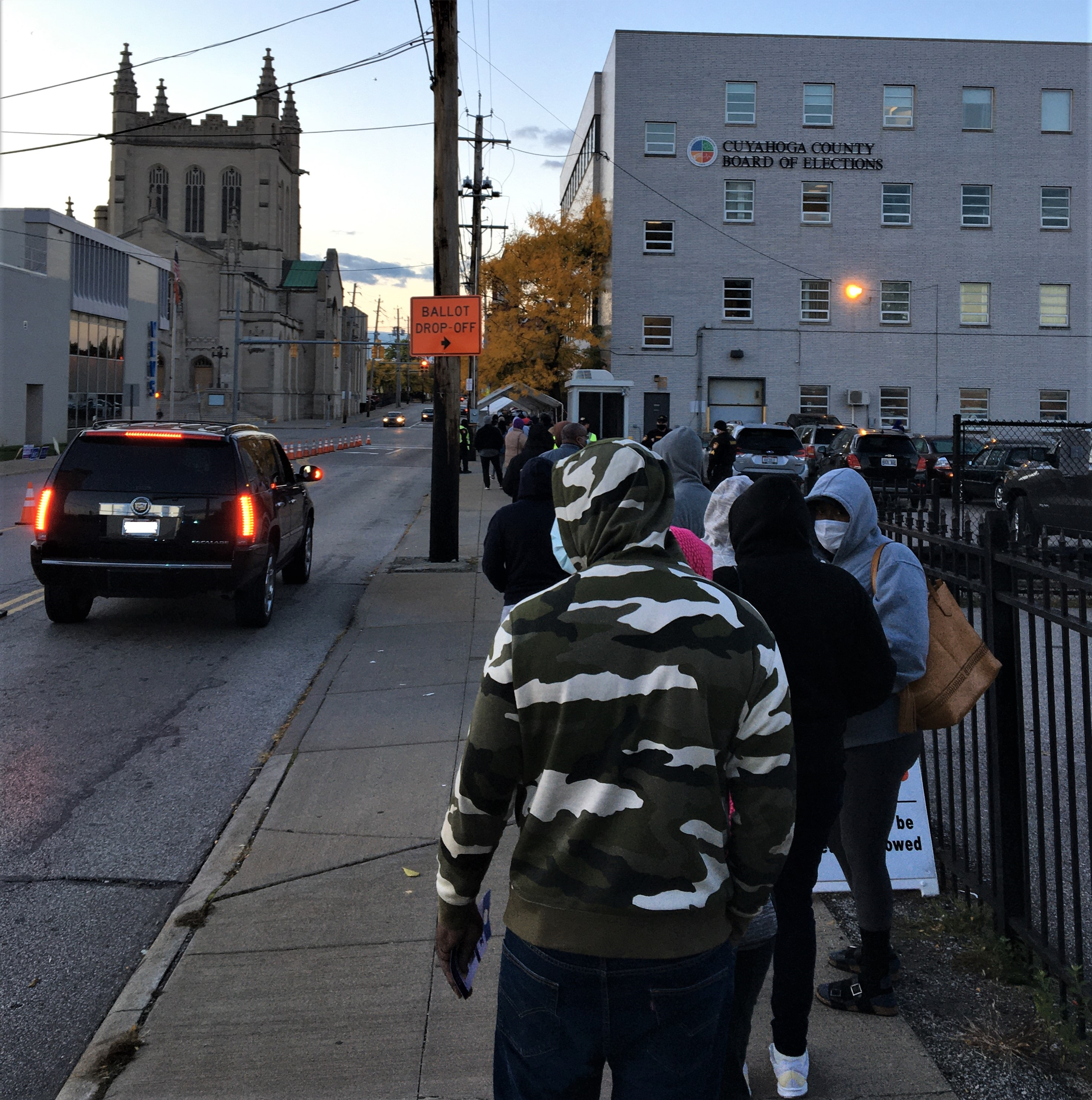
Early voting in Cleveland, Ohio

=== Statistics ===
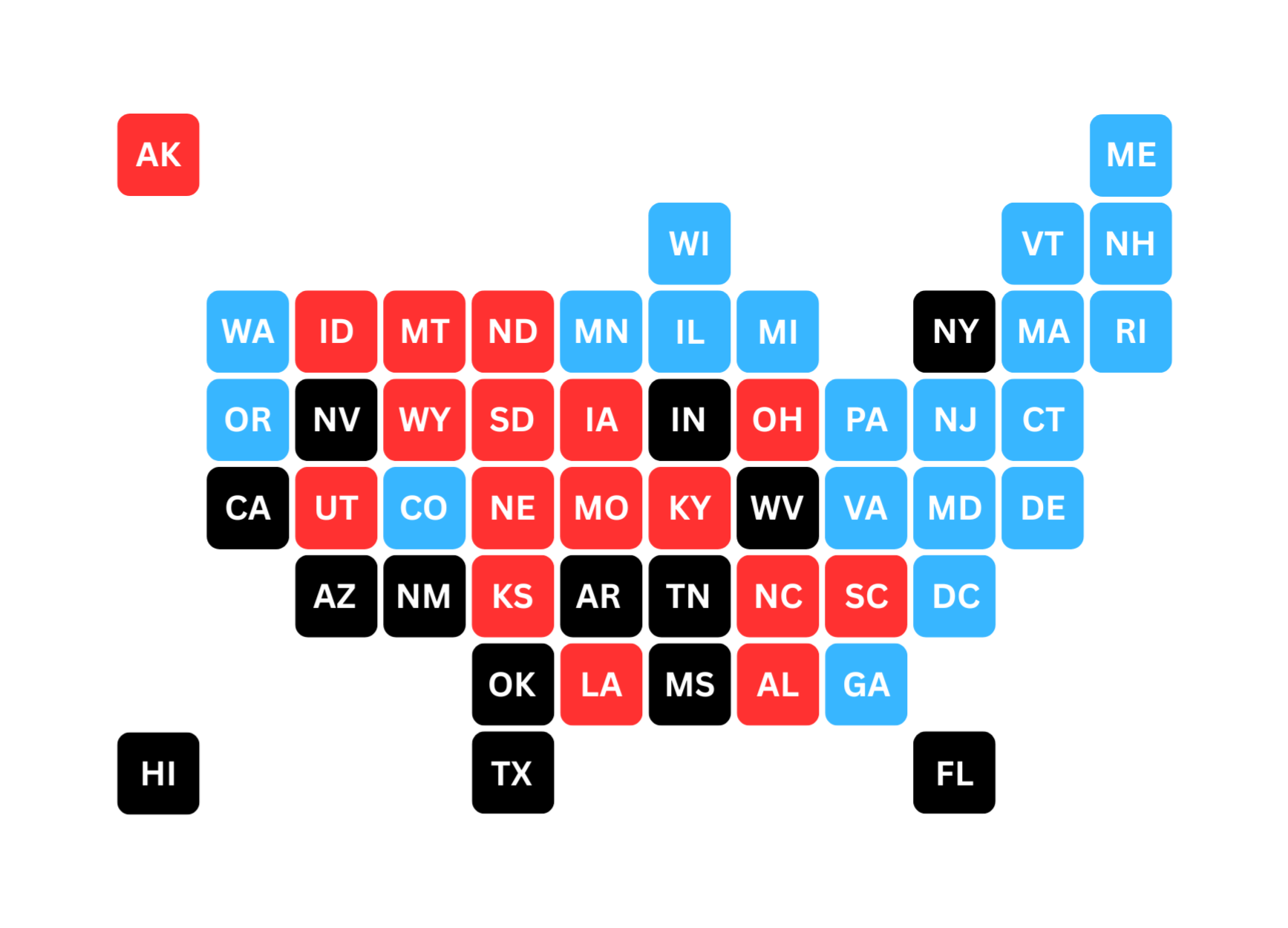
In 14 states, representing 223 electoral votes, a plurality of voters chose to stay home rather than vote for any candidate.

More than 158 million votes were cast in the election. More than 100 million of them were cast before Election Day by early voting or mail ballot, due to the ongoing COVID-19 pandemic. The election saw the highest voter turnout as a percentage of eligible voters since 1900, with each of the two main tickets receiving more than 74 million votes, surpassing Barack Obama's record of 69.5 million votes in 2008. The Biden–Harris ticket received more than 81 million votes, the most votes ever in a U.S. presidential election. It was also the ninth consecutive presidential election where the victorious major party nominee did not receive a popular vote majority by a double-digit margin over the losing major party nominee(s), continuing the longest sequence of such presidential elections in U.S. history, which began in 1988 and in 2016 eclipsed the previous longest sequence, that from 1876 through 1900. (Note: In every presidential election from 1788–89 through 1828, multiple state legislatures selected their presidential electors by discretionary appointment rather than upon the results of a poll, while the South Carolina General Assembly did so in every presidential election through 1860 and the Colorado General Assembly selected its state's electors by discretionary appointment in the 1876 election.) In 2020, 58 percent of U.S. voters lived in landslide counties, a decline from 61 percent in 2016.

Trump became the 11th incumbent in the country's history, and the first since 1992, to lose a bid for a second term. Biden's 51.3% of the popular vote was the highest for a challenger to an incumbent president since 1932. (Note: Although Ronald Reagan in 1980 and Bill Clinton in 1992 defeated their incumbent opponents by wider popular-vote margins than Biden's, their shares of the vote were kept lower by substantial third-party voting.) Biden is the sixth vice president to become president without succeeding to the office on the death or resignation of a previous president. Additionally, Trump's loss marked the third time an elected president lost the popular vote twice, the first being John Quincy Adams in the 1820s and Benjamin Harrison in the 1880s and 1890s. This was the first time since 1980, and the first for Republicans since 1892 that a party was voted out after a single four-year term. This was the second election in American history in which the incumbent president lost re-election despite winning a greater share of the popular vote than he did in the previous election, after 1828. It is also the third election in which the two candidates that received electoral votes carried the same number of states. This also happened in 1880 and 1848.

Biden won 25 states, the District of Columbia, and one congressional district in Nebraska, totaling 306 electoral votes. Trump won 25 states and one congressional district in Maine, totaling 232 electoral votes. This result was exactly the reverse of Trump's victory, 306 to 232, in 2016 (excluding faithless electors). Biden became the first Democrat to win the presidential election in Georgia since 1992 and in Arizona since 1996, and the first candidate to win nationally without Florida since 1992 and Ohio since 1960, casting doubt on Ohio's continued status as a bellwether state. Biden also became the first Democrat to win the presidential election without Iowa since 1976. (Note: Republicans George H. W. Bush in 1988 and George W. Bush in 2000 won the presidency without Iowa.) Biden carried five states won by Trump in 2016: Arizona, Georgia, Michigan, Pennsylvania, and Wisconsin. Despite his relatively comfortable 74 vote margin in the Electoral College, Biden only won the decisive states of Wisconsin, Georgia and Arizona by a combined 43,000 votes. He also became the first Democrat since 2008 to carry Nebraska's 2nd congressional district, winning one electoral vote from the state. Trump did not win any states won by Clinton in 2016. Biden's three gains in the Rust Belt—Michigan, Pennsylvania and Wisconsin—were widely characterized as a rebuilding of the blue wall, a term widely used in the press for the states consistently won by Democrats from 1992 to 2012, broken by Trump in 2016 when he narrowly flipped those three Rust Belt states. Nevertheless, amidst Trump's national and electoral defeat, his scoring decisive victories in Ohio, Iowa, and Florida for the second time, after their having backed Obama twice, has led many commentators to conclude they have shifted from perennial swing states to reliable red states.

If Biden's three narrowest state victories—Wisconsin, Georgia, and Arizona, all of which he won by less than a percentage point—had gone to Trump, there would have been a tie of 269 electors for each candidate, causing a contingent election to be decided by the House of Representatives, where Trump had the advantage. (Even though Democrats controlled the House, contingent elections are determined by state delegations in which each state receives just one vote, and since a slight majority of states in 2020 contained more Republican than Democratic representatives, Republicans would have had more votes in such an election.) This scenario would have required a popular-vote shift of 0.63% or less in each of these three states, a total of about 43,000 votes, 0.03% of votes cast nationally. This situation paralleled 2016, when a shift of 0.77% or less in each of the three most closely contested states (Wisconsin, Michigan, and Pennsylvania), or about 77,000 votes, would have resulted in the popular vote winner Hillary Clinton also winning in the Electoral College.

This was the first time since 1948 that Democrats won the popular vote in four elections in a row. Biden was the second former vice president (after Richard Nixon in 1968) to win the presidency, as well as the first vice president since George H. W. Bush in 1988 to be elected president.

Almost all counties previously considered reliable indicators of eventual success in presidential elections voted for Trump instead of Biden, meaning that they did not continue their streaks as bellwether counties. This was attributed to increasing political polarization throughout the country and to the urban-rural divide.

While Trump still dominated rural America as a whole, there were rural areas that he lost. Biden won 50.5% of the rural counties that each had mostly non-white voters, particularly in the South and the West. Rural counties in the South won by Biden had greater economic distress than those won by Trump; in the Northeast, the opposite was true. In the West, Biden did especially well in rural counties that had high shares of workers employed in leisure and hospitality. Such counties likewise had large constituencies of immigration from other states. Biden was the oldest person to win a presidential election, at age 77 surpassing Trump's 2016 record of doing so at age 70. Biden was also the oldest president ever elected, surpassing Ronald Reagan's 1984 record of doing so at age 73. Four years later, in 2024, Trump surpassed both records of doing so at age 78. Of the 3,153 counties/districts/independent cities making returns, Trump won the most popular votes in 2,595 (82.30%) while Biden carried 558 (17.70%).

=== Election calls ===
Major news organizations project a state for a candidate when there is high mathematical confidence that the outstanding vote would be unlikely to prevent the projected winner from ultimately winning the state. Election projections are made by decision teams of political scientists and data scientists.

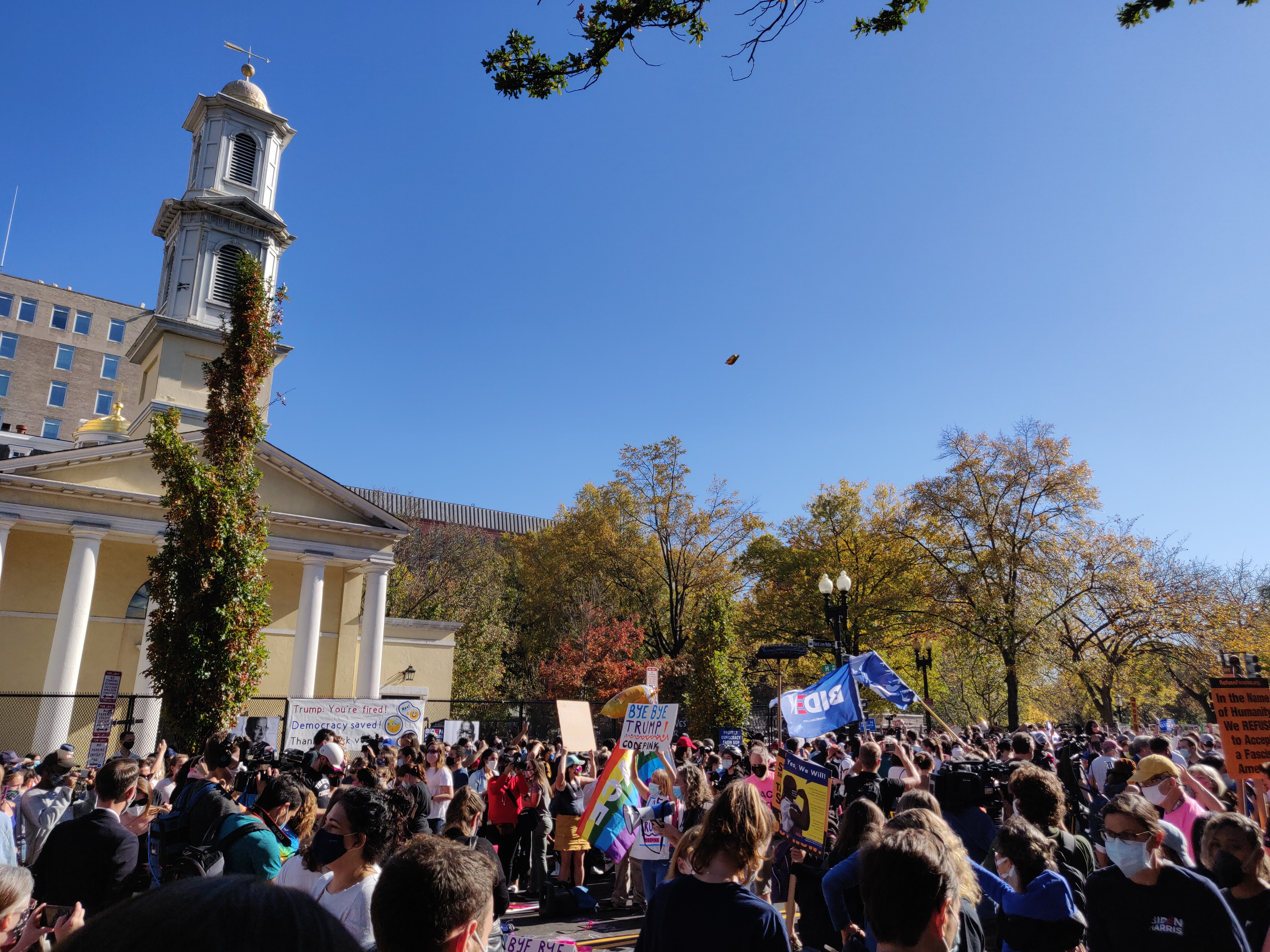
People celebrate in the streets near the White House after the major networks projected Biden the winner of the election on November 7.

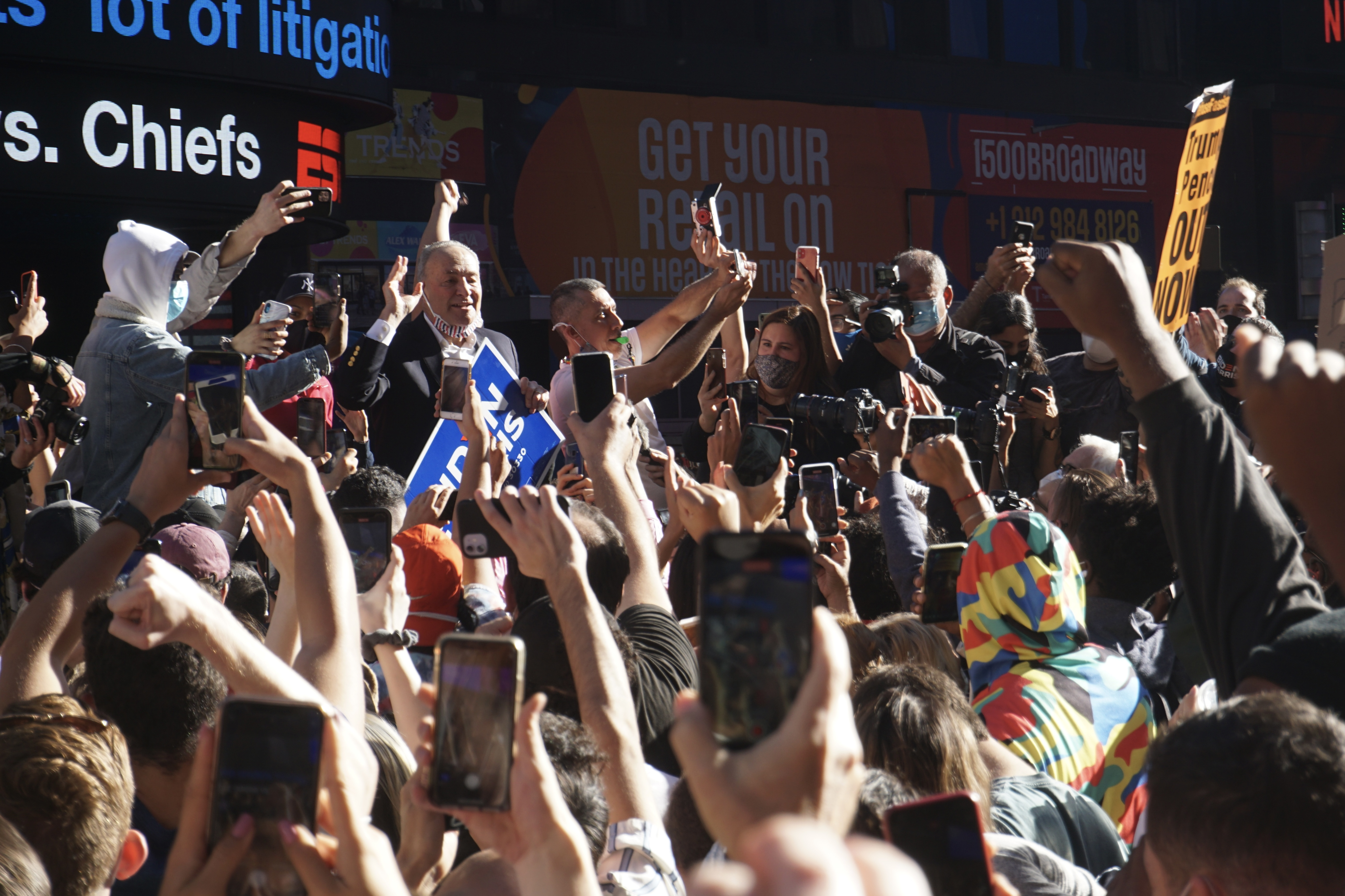
Senator Chuck Schumer addresses a crowd celebrating in Times Square, New York City, shortly after the election was called for Biden.

In the early hours of November 4, the Associated Press called Florida for Donald Trump at 12:35 a.m. EST, putting him at 164 electoral votes. By 1:06 a.m. EST, they called Texas for Trump, putting him at 202 electoral votes, compared to Joe Biden's 224. Arizona and Maine were called for Biden at 2:51 a.m. and 3:06 a.m. EST, respectively. At 1:24 p.m. EST that afternoon, the Associated Press called Maine's 2nd congressional district for Trump, giving him 203 electoral votes. Then, Biden won Wisconsin and Michigan, at 2:16 p.m. and 3:58 p.m. EST, respectively, bringing him to 264 electoral votes, just 6 short of the presidency. On the morning of November 7 at approximately 11:25 a.m. EST, roughly three and a half days after polls had closed, ABC News, NBC News, CBS News, the Associated Press, CNN, and Fox News all called the election and Pennsylvania's 20 electoral votes for Biden, based on projections of votes in Pennsylvania showing him leading outside of the recount threshold (0.5% in that state), placing him at 284 electoral votes. That evening, Biden and Harris gave their victory speeches in Wilmington, Delaware.

=== OSCE election monitoring ===
On the invitation of the U.S. State Department, the Organization for Security and Co-operation in Europe's (OSCE) Office for Democratic Institutions and Human Rights (ODIHR), which has been monitoring U.S. elections since 2002 (as it does for major elections in all other OSCE member countries), sent 102 observers from 39 countries. The task force consisted of long-term observers from the ODIHR office (led by former Polish diplomat Urszula Gacek) deployed to 28 states from September on and covering 15 states on election day, and a group of European lawmakers acting as short-term observers (led by German parliamentarian Michael Georg Link), reporting from Maryland, Virginia, California, Nevada, Michigan, Missouri, Wisconsin, and D.C. Due to the COVID-19 pandemic, it was scaled down to a "limited election observation mission" from the originally planned 100 long-term observers and 400 short-term observers.

An interim report published by the OSCE shortly before the election noted that many ODIHR interlocutors "expressed grave concerns about the risk of legitimacy of the elections being questioned due to the incumbent President's repeated allegations of a fraudulent election process, and postal vote in particular." On the day after the election, the task force published preliminary findings, with part of the summary stating:

The 3 November general elections were competitive and well managed despite legal uncertainties and logistical challenges. In a highly polarized political environment, harsh campaign rhetoric fuelled tensions. Measures intended to secure the elections during the pandemic triggered protracted litigation driven by partisan interests. The uncertainty caused by late legal challenges and evidence-deficient claims about election fraud created confusion and concern among election officials and voters. Voter registration and identification rules in some states are unduly restrictive for certain groups of citizens. The media, although sharply polarized, provided comprehensive coverage of the campaign and made efforts to provide accurate information on the organization of elections.

Link said that "on the election day itself, we couldn't see any violations" at the polling places visited by the observers. The task force also found "nothing untoward" while observing the handling of mail-in ballots at post offices, with Gacek being quoted as saying: "We feel that allegations of systemic wrongdoing in these elections have no solid ground. The system has held up well." The OSCE's election monitoring branch published a more comprehensive report in early 2021.

=== Electoral results ===
Candidates are listed individually below if they received more than 0.1% of the popular vote. Popular vote totals are from the Federal Election Commission report.

Electoral results
Presidential candidate	Party	Home state	Popular vote		Electoral vote	Running mate		
Presidential candidate	Party	Home state	Count	Percentage	Electoral vote	Vice-presidential candidate	Home state	Electoral vote
Joe Biden	Democratic	Delaware	81,283,501	51.31%	306	Kamala Harris	California	306
Donald Trump (incumbent)	Republican	Florida	74,223,975	46.85%	232	Mike Pence (incumbent)	Indiana	232
Jo Jorgensen	Libertarian	South Carolina	1,865,535	1.18%	0	Spike Cohen	South Carolina	0
Howie Hawkins	Green	New York	407,068	0.26%	0	Angela Nicole Walker	South Carolina	0
Other			649,552	0.40%	—	Other		—
Total			158,429,631	100%	538			538
Needed to win					270			270

Popular vote
Biden	51.31%
Trump	46.85%
Jorgensen	1.18%
Hawkins	0.26%
Others	0.40%

Electoral vote
Biden/Harris	56.88%
Trump/Pence	43.12%

↓
306	232
Biden	Trump

=== Results by state ===
Legend
States won by Biden/Harris
States won by Trump/Pence
EV	Electoral votes
†	At-large results (for Maine and Nebraska, which both split electoral votes)

Results by state
State or district	Biden/Harris Democratic			Trump/Pence Republican			Jorgensen/Cohen Libertarian			Hawkins/Walker Green			Others			Margin		Margin swing (Note: Percentage point difference in margin from the 2016 election)	Total votes
State or district	Votes	%	EV	Votes	%	EV	Votes	%	EV	Votes	%	EV	Votes	%	EV	Votes	%	%	Total votes
Alabama	849,624	36.57%	–	1,441,170	62.03%	9	25,176	1.08%	–	– (Note: These candidates may have received write-in votes, which were not reported individually and are included in others.)	–	–	7,312	0.31%	–	−591,546	−25.46%	2.27%	2,323,282
Alaska	153,778	42.77%	–	189,951	52.83%	3	8,897	2.47%	–	– (Note: Votes for Jesse Ventura and Cynthia McKinney, who were nominated to the ballot by the Green Party of Alaska instead of the national candidates, are included in others. Hawkins/Walker may have received write-in votes, which were not reported individually and are also included in others.)	–	–	6,904	1.92%	–	−36,173	−10.06%	4.67%	359,530
Arizona	1,672,143	49.36%	11	1,661,686	49.06%	–	51,465	1.52%	–	1,557	0.05%	–	475	0.01%	–	10,457	0.31%	3.81%	3,387,326
Arkansas	423,932	34.78%	–	760,647	62.40%	6	13,133	1.08%	–	2,980	0.24%	–	18,377	1.51%	–	−336,715	−27.62%	−0.70%	1,219,069
California	11,110,639	63.48%	55	6,006,518	34.32%	–	187,910	1.07%	–	81,032	0.46%	–	115,281	0.66%	–	5,104,121	29.16%	−0.95%	17,501,380
Colorado	1,804,352	55.40%	9	1,364,607	41.90%	–	52,460	1.61%	–	8,986	0.28%	–	26,575	0.82%	–	439,745	13.50%	8.59%	3,256,980
Connecticut	1,080,831	59.26%	7	714,717	39.19%	–	20,230	1.11%	–	7,538	0.41%	–	541	0.03%	–	366,114	20.07%	6.43%	1,823,857
Delaware	296,268	58.74%	3	200,603	39.77%	–	5,000	0.99%	–	2,139	0.42%	–	336	0.07%	–	95,665	18.97%	7.60%	504,346
District of Columbia	317,323	92.15%	3	18,586	5.40%	–	2,036	0.59%	–	1,726	0.50%	–	4,685	1.36%	–	298,737	86.75%	−0.02%	344,356
Florida	5,297,045	47.86%	–	5,668,731	51.22%	29	70,324	0.64%	–	14,721	0.13%	–	16,635	0.15%	–	−371,686	−3.36%	−2.16%	11,067,456
Georgia	2,473,633	49.47%	16	2,461,854	49.24%	–	62,229	1.24%	–	1,013	0.02%	–	1,231	0.02%	–	11,779	0.23%	5.37%	4,999,960
Hawaii	366,130	63.73%	4	196,864	34.27%	–	5,539	0.96%	–	3,822	0.67%	–	2,114	0.37%	–	169,266	29.46%	−2.72%	574,469
Idaho	287,021	33.07%	–	554,119	63.84%	4	16,404	1.89%	–	407	0.05%	–	9,983	1.15%	–	−267,098	−30.77%	1.00%	867,934
Illinois	3,471,915	57.54%	20	2,446,891	40.55%	–	66,544	1.10%	–	30,494	0.51%	–	17,900	0.30%	–	1,025,024	16.99%	−0.08%	6,033,744
Indiana	1,242,498	40.96%	–	1,729,857	57.03%	11	58,901	1.94%	–	989	0.03%	–	965	0.03%	–	−487,359	−16.07%	3.10%	3,033,210
Iowa	759,061	44.89%	–	897,672	53.09%	6	19,637	1.16%	–	3,075	0.18%	–	11,426	0.68%	–	−138,611	−8.20%	1.21%	1,690,871
Kansas	570,323	41.51%	–	771,406	56.14%	6	30,574	2.23%	–	669	0.05%	–	1,014	0.07%	–	−201,083	−14.64%	5.96%	1,373,986
Kentucky	772,474	36.15%	–	1,326,646	62.09%	8	26,234	1.23%	–	716	0.03%	–	10,698	0.50%	–	−554,172	−25.94%	3.90%	2,136,768
Louisiana	856,034	39.85%	–	1,255,776	58.46%	8	21,645	1.01%	–	–	–	–	14,607	0.68%	–	−399,742	−18.61%	1.03%	2,148,062
Maine †	435,072	53.09%	2	360,737	44.02%	–	14,152	1.73%	–	8,230	1.00%	–	1,270	0.15%	–	74,335	9.07%	6.11%	819,461
ME-1	266,376	60.11%	1	164,045	37.02%	–	7,343	1.66%	–	4,654	1.05%	–	694	0.16%	–	102,331	23.09%	8.28%	443,112
ME-2	168,696	44.82%	–	196,692	52.26%	1	6,809	1.81%	–	3,576	0.95%	–	576	0.15%	–	−27,996	−7.44%	2.85%	376,349
Maryland	1,985,023	65.36%	10	976,414	32.15%	–	33,488	1.10%	–	15,799	0.52%	–	26,306	0.87%	–	1,008,609	33.21%	6.79%	3,037,030
Massachusetts	2,382,202	65.60%	11	1,167,202	32.14%	–	47,013	1.29%	–	18,658	0.51%	–	16,327	0.45%	–	1,215,000	33.46%	6.26%	3,631,402
Michigan	2,804,040	50.62%	16	2,649,852	47.84%	–	60,381	1.09%	–	13,718	0.25%	–	11,311	0.20%	–	154,188	2.78%	3.01%	5,539,302
Minnesota	1,717,077	52.40%	10	1,484,065	45.28%	–	34,976	1.07%	–	10,033	0.31%	–	31,020	0.95%	–	233,012	7.11%	5.59%	3,277,171
Mississippi	539,398	41.06%	–	756,764	57.60%	6	8,026	0.61%	–	1,498	0.11%	–	8,073	0.61%	–	−217,366	−16.55%	1.28%	1,313,759
Missouri	1,253,014	41.41%	–	1,718,736	56.80%	10	41,205	1.36%	–	8,283	0.27%	–	4,724	0.16%	–	−465,722	−15.39%	3.25%	3,025,962
Montana	244,786	40.55%	–	343,602	56.92%	3	15,252	2.53%	–	–	–	–	34	0.01%	–	−98,816	−16.37%	4.05%	603,674
Nebraska †	374,583	39.17%	–	556,846	58.22%	2	20,283	2.12%	–	–	–	–	4,671	0.49%	–	−182,263	−19.06%	5.99%	956,383
NE-1	132,261	41.09%	–	180,290	56.01%	1	7,495	2.33%	–	–	–	–	1,840	0.57%	–	−48,029	−14.92%	5.80%	321,886
NE-2	176,468	51.95%	1	154,377	45.45%	–	6,909	2.03%	–	–	–	–	1,912	0.56%	–	22,091	6.50%	8.74%	339,666
NE-3	65,854	22.34%	–	222,179	75.36%	1	5,879	1.99%	–	–	–	–	919	0.31%	–	−156,325	−53.02%	1.17%	294,831
Nevada (Note: Others and total votes include votes for the ballot option "none of these candidates", which are counted as valid votes by the Nevada Secretary of State.)	703,486	50.06%	6	669,890	47.67%	–	14,783	1.05%	–	–	–	–	17,217	1.23%	–	33,596	2.39%	−0.03%	1,405,376
New Hampshire	424,937	52.71%	4	365,660	45.36%	–	13,236	1.64%	–	217	0.03%	–	2,155	0.27%	–	59,277	7.35%	6.98%	806,205
New Jersey (Note: Additional candidates may have received write-in votes, which were not reported and are not included in others, total votes or percentages.)	2,608,400	57.33%	14	1,883,313	41.40%	–	31,677	0.70%	–	14,202	0.31%	–	11,865	0.26%	–	725,087	15.93%	1.84%	4,549,457
New Mexico	501,614	54.29%	5	401,894	43.50%	–	12,585	1.36%	–	4,426	0.48%	–	3,446	0.37%	–	99,720	10.79%	2.58%	923,965
New York	5,244,886	60.87%	29	3,251,997	37.74%	–	60,383	0.70%	–	32,832	0.38%	–	26,763	0.31%	–	1,992,889	23.13%	0.64%	8,616,861
North Carolina	2,684,292	48.59%	–	2,758,775	49.93%	15	48,678	0.88%	–	12,195	0.22%	–	20,864	0.38%	–	−74,483	−1.35%	2.31%	5,524,804
North Dakota	115,042	31.78%	–	235,751	65.12%	3	9,371	2.59%	–	–	–	–	1,860	0.51%	–	−120,709	−33.34%	2.39%	362,024
Ohio	2,679,165	45.24%	–	3,154,834	53.27%	18	67,569	1.14%	–	18,812	0.32%	–	1,822	0.03%	–	−475,669	−8.03%	0.10%	5,922,202
Oklahoma	503,890	32.29%	–	1,020,280	65.37%	7	24,731	1.58%	–	–	–	–	11,798	0.76%	–	−516,390	−33.09%	3.99%	1,560,699
Oregon	1,340,383	56.45%	7	958,448	40.37%	–	41,582	1.75%	–	11,831	0.50%	–	22,077	0.93%	–	381,935	16.09%	5.10%	2,374,321
Pennsylvania	3,458,229	49.85%	20	3,377,674	48.69%	–	79,380	1.14%	–	1,282	0.02%	–	20,411	0.29%	–	80,555	1.16%	1.88%	6,936,976
Rhode Island	307,486	59.39%	4	199,922	38.61%	–	5,053	0.98%	–	–	–	–	5,296	1.02%	–	107,564	20.78%	5.26%	517,757
South Carolina	1,091,541	43.43%	–	1,385,103	55.11%	9	27,916	1.11%	–	6,907	0.27%	–	1,862	0.07%	–	−293,562	−11.68%	2.59%	2,513,329
South Dakota	150,471	35.61%	–	261,043	61.77%	3	11,095	2.63%	–	–	–	–	–	–	–	−110,572	−26.16%	3.63%	422,609
Tennessee	1,143,711	37.45%	–	1,852,475	60.66%	11	29,877	0.98%	–	4,545	0.15%	–	23,243	0.76%	–	−708,764	−23.21%	2.80%	3,053,851
Texas (Note: This table reflects the results certified by the state, which recorded some write-in votes differently from those reported by some counties.)	5,259,126	46.48%	–	5,890,347	52.06%	38	126,243	1.12%	–	33,396	0.30%	–	5,944	0.05%	–	−631,221	−5.58%	3.41%	11,315,056
Utah	560,282	37.65%	–	865,140	58.13%	6	38,447	2.58%	–	5,053	0.34%	–	19,367	1.30%	–	−304,858	−20.48%	−2.40%	1,488,289
Vermont	242,820	66.09%	3	112,704	30.67%	–	3,608	0.98%	–	1,310	0.36%	–	6,986	1.90%	–	130,116	35.41%	9.00%	367,428
Virginia	2,413,568	54.11%	13	1,962,430	44.00%	–	64,761	1.45%	–	–	–	–	19,765	0.44%	–	451,138	10.11%	4.79%	4,460,524
Washington	2,369,612	57.97%	12	1,584,651	38.77%	–	80,500	1.97%	–	18,289	0.45%	–	34,579	0.85%	–	784,961	19.20%	3.49%	4,087,631
West Virginia	235,984	29.69%	–	545,382	68.62%	5	10,687	1.34%	–	2,599	0.33%	–	79	0.01%	–	−309,398	−38.93%	3.14%	794,731
Wisconsin	1,630,866	49.45%	10	1,610,184	48.82%	–	38,491	1.17%	–	1,089	0.03%	–	17,411	0.53%	–	20,682	0.63%	1.40%	3,298,041
Wyoming	73,491	26.55%	–	193,559	69.94%	3	5,768	2.08%	–	–	–	–	3,947	1.43%	–	−120,068	−43.38%	2.92%	276,765
Total	81,283,501	51.31%	306	74,223,975	46.85%	232	1,865,535	1.18%	–	407,068	0.26%	–	649,552	0.41%	–	7,059,526	4.46%	2.36%	158,429,631
	Biden/Harris Democratic			Trump/Pence Republican			Jorgensen/Cohen Libertarian			Hawkins/Walker Green			Others			Margin		Margin swing	Total votes

Two states, Maine and Nebraska, allow their electoral votes to be split between candidates by congressional districts. The winner of each congressional district gets one electoral vote for the district. The winner of the statewide vote gets two additional electoral votes.

==== States and EV districts that flipped from Republican to Democratic ====
- Arizona
- Georgia
- Michigan
- Nebraska's 2nd congressional district
- Pennsylvania
- Wisconsin

=== Close states ===
States where the margin of victory was under 1% (37 electoral votes; all won by Biden):

1. Georgia, 0.23% (11,779 votes) – 16 electoral votes
2. Arizona, 0.30% (10,457 votes) – 11 electoral votes
3. Wisconsin, 0.63% (20,682 votes) – 10 electoral votes (tipping-point state for Biden victory)

States where the margin of victory was between 1% and 5% (86 electoral votes; 42 won by Biden, 44 by Trump):

1. Pennsylvania, 1.16% (80,555 votes) – 20 electoral votes (tipping-point state for Trump victory)
2. North Carolina, 1.34% (74,483 votes) – 15 electoral votes
3. Nevada, 2.39% (33,596 votes) – 6 electoral votes
4. Michigan, 2.78% (154,188 votes) – 16 electoral votes
5. Florida, 3.36% (371,686 votes) – 29 electoral votes

States/districts where the margin of victory was between 5% and 10% (80 electoral votes; 17 won by Biden, 63 by Trump):

1. Texas, 5.58% (631,221 votes) – 38 electoral votes
2. Nebraska's 2nd congressional district, 6.50% (22,091 votes) – 1 electoral vote
3. Minnesota, 7.12% (233,012 votes) – 10 electoral votes
4. New Hampshire, 7.35% (59,267 votes) – 4 electoral votes
5. Maine's 2nd congressional district, 7.44% (27,996 votes) – 1 electoral vote
6. Ohio, 8.03% (475,669 votes) – 18 electoral votes
7. Iowa, 8.20% (138,611 votes) – 6 electoral votes
8. Maine, 9.07% (74,335 votes) – 2 electoral votes

Blue denotes states or congressional districts won by Democrat Joe Biden; red denotes those won by Republican Donald Trump.

=== County statistics ===
Counties and county-equivalents with highest percentage of Democratic vote:

1. Kalawao County, Hawaii – 95.8%
2. Washington, D.C. – 92.15%
3. Prince George's County, Maryland – 89.26%
4. Oglala Lakota County, South Dakota – 88.41%
5. Petersburg, Virginia – 87.75%

Counties with highest percentage of Republican vote:

1. Roberts County, Texas – 96.18%
2. Borden County, Texas – 95.43%
3. King County, Texas – 94.97%
4. Garfield County, Montana – 93.97%
5. Glasscock County, Texas – 93.57%

=== Maps ===
Results by state, shaded according to winning candidate's percentage of the vote

States shaded by margin of victory

A discontinuous cartogram of the 2020 United States presidential election, scaled by their Electoral College contribution

A discretized cartogram of the 2020 United States presidential election using hexagons

Results by county (Note: Alaska and Louisiana do not have counties. Alaska's boroughs and census areas and Louisiana's parishes are pictured.)

Results by county, shaded according to winning candidate's percentage of the vote

Results by county flips from 2016 to the 2020 presidential election

County swing from 2016 to 2020

Margin swing in each state between the 2016 and 2020 presidential elections

Shaded election results by county (red-purple-blue scale)

A continuous county-level cartogram of the 2020 United States presidential election

Results by congressional district

Results by state, shaded according to percentage of the vote for Jo Jorgensen

== Voter demographics ==
Voter demographic data for 2020 were collected by Edison Research for the National Election Pool, a consortium of ABC News, CBS News, MSNBC, CNN, Fox News, and the Associated Press. The voter survey is based on exit polls completed by 15,590 voters in person as well as by phone.

2020 presidential election voter demographics (exit polling)
Demographic subgroup	Biden	Trump	% of total vote
Total vote	51	47	100
Ideology
Liberals	89	10	24
Moderates	64	34	38
Conservatives	14	85	38
Party
Democrats	94	6	37
Republicans	6	94	36
Independents	54	41	26
Gender
Men	45	53	48
Women	57	42	52
Marital status
Married	45	53	56
Unmarried	58	40	44
Gender by marital status
Married men	43	55	30
Married women	48	51	26
Unmarried men	52	45	20
Unmarried women	62	36	23
Race/ethnicity
White	41	58	67
Black	87	12	13
Latino	65	33	13
Asian	63	36	4
Other	55	41	4
Gender by race/ethnicity
White men	38	61	35
White women	44	55	32
Black men	79	19	4
Black women	90	9	8
Latino men	59	36	5
Latina women	69	30	8
Other	58	38	8
Religion
Protestant/Other Christian	39	60	43
Catholic	52	47	25
Jewish	76	22	2
Muslim	78	19	1
Other religion	68	29	8
None	65	31	22
White evangelical or born-again Christian
Yes	24	76	28
No	62	36	72
Age
18–24 years old	65	31	9
25–29 years old	54	43	7
30–39 years old	51	46	16
40–49 years old	54	44	16
50–64 years old	47	52	30
65 and older	47	52	22
Age by race
White 18–29 years old	44	53	8
White 30–44 years old	41	57	14
White 45–59 years old	38	61	19
White 60 and older	42	57	26
Black 18–29 years old	88	10	3
Black 30–44 years old	78	19	4
Black 45–59 years old	89	10	3
Black 60 and older	92	7	3
Latino 18–29 years old	69	28	4
Latino 30–44 years old	62	35	4
Latino 45–59 years old	68	30	3
Latino 60 and older	58	40	2
Others	59	38	8
Sexual orientation
LGBT	75	23	7
Non-LGBT	51	48	93
First time voter
Yes	64	32	14
No	49	49	86
Education
College graduate	55	43	41
No college degree	48	50	59
Educational attainment
High school or less	46	54	19
Some college education	51	47	23
Associate degree	47	50	16
Bachelor's degree	51	47	27
Postgraduate degree	62	37	15
Education by race
White college graduates	51	48	32
White no college degree	32	67	35
Non-white college graduates	70	27	10
Non-white no college degree	72	26	24
Education by race/gender
White women with college degrees	54	45	14
White women without college degrees	36	63	17
White men with college degrees	48	51	17
White men without college degrees	28	70	18
Non-White	71	26	33
Income
Under $30,000	54	46	15
$30,000–49,999	56	44	20
$50,000–99,999	56	42	39
$100,000–199,999	41	57	20
Over $200,000	48	48	7
Union households
Yes	56	41	20
No	50	49	80
Military service
Veterans	44	54	15
Non-veterans	53	45	85
Region
East	58	40	20
Midwest	47	51	23
South	46	53	35
West	57	41	22
Area type
Urban	60	38	29
Suburban	50	48	51
Rural	42	57	19

The Brookings Institution released a report entitled "Exit polls show both familiar and new voting blocs sealed Biden's win" on November 12, 2020. In it, author William H. Frey attributes Obama's 2008 win to young people, people of color, and the college-educated. Frey contends Trump won in 2016 thanks to older White without college degrees. Frey says the same coalitions largely held in 2008 and 2016, although in key battleground states Biden increased his vote among some of the 2016 Trump groups, particularly among White and older Americans. Trump won the white vote in 2016 by 20% but in 2020 by only 16%. The Democratic Party won black voters by 75%, the lowest margin since 1980. Democrats won the Latino vote by 32%, which is the smallest margin since 2004, and they won the Asian American vote by 27%, the lowest figure since 2008. Biden reduced the Republican margin of white men without college educations from 48% to 42%, and the Democrats made a slight improvement of 2% among white, college-educated women.

People age 18 to 29 registered a rise in Democratic support between 2016 and 2020, with the Democratic margin of victory among that demographic increasing from 19% to 24%. However, Baby boomers and Generation X still constituted the majority of the voting public. The exit poll estimated that voters 40 years of age or older (born in 1980 or earlier) to comprise 68% of the electorate. Voters from age 40 through age 64 (born from 1956 through 1980) alone were estimated to comprise 46% of the electorate.

Post-election analysis using verified voter data found the Associated Press's Votecast was more accurate than the exit polls.

=== Voting patterns by ethnicity ===
==== Hispanic and Latino voters ====
Biden won 65% of the Latino vote according to Edison Research, and 63% according to the Associated Press. Voto Latino reported that the Latino vote was crucial to the Biden victory in Arizona. 40% of Latino voters who voted in 2020 did not vote in 2016, and 73% of those Latino voters voted for Biden (438,000 voters). Florida and Texas, which have large Latino populations, were carried by Trump. In Florida, Trump won a majority of Cuban American voters in Miami-Dade County, Florida. The Latino vote was still crucial to enable Biden to carry states such as Nevada. Latino voters were targeted by a major Spanish-language disinformation campaign in the final weeks of the election, with various falsehoods and conspiracy theories being pushed out by WhatsApp and viral social media posts.

Demographic patterns emerged having to do with country of origin and candidate preference. Pre- and post-election surveys showed Biden winning Latinos of Mexican, Puerto Rican, Dominican, Spanish, and Nuevomexicano heritage, while Trump carried Latinos of Cuban heritage. Data from Florida showed Biden holding a narrow edge among South Americans.

==== Black voters ====
Biden won 87% of the Black vote, while Trump won 12%. Biden's advantage among Black voters was crucial in the large cities of Pennsylvania and Michigan; the increase in the Democratic vote in Milwaukee County of about 28,000 votes was more than the 20,000-vote lead Biden had in the state of Wisconsin. Almost half Biden's gains in Georgia came from the four largest counties—Fulton, DeKalb, Gwinnett, and Cobb—all in the Atlanta metro area with large Black populations. Trump improved his overall share of the Black vote from 2016 by 4% and doubled the Black vote that Mitt Romney received in 2012.

==== Asian American and Pacific Island voters ====
Polls showed that 68% of Asian American and Pacific Island (AAPI) voters supported Biden/Harris, while 28% supported Trump/Pence. Karthick Ramakrishnan, a political science professor at the University of California Riverside and founder of AAPI Data, said Asian Americans supported Biden over Trump by about a 2:1 margin. Korean Americans, Japanese Americans, Indian Americans, and Chinese Americans favored Biden by higher margins overall compared to Vietnamese Americans and Filipino Americans. Many voters were turned off by Trump's language some of which was widely considered racist such as ("China virus" and "kung flu") but, according to Vox reporter Terry Nguyen, many Vietnamese voters (and especially elderly, South Vietnamese migrants who populated coastal centers in the 1970s) appreciated his strong anti-China stance.

==== Indian American voters ====
Data from FiveThirtyEight indicated 65% of Indian American voters backed Joe Biden, and 28% supported Donald Trump. Some Indian Americans self-identified with Kamala Harris, but others approved of Donald Trump's support of Indian Prime Minister Narendra Modi. In a speech given to 50,000 Indian-Americans during his 2019 visit to the US, Modi praised Trump with remarks that were interpreted as an indirect endorsement of his candidacy. Indian right-wing organizations like the Hindu Sena had performed special havans and pujas for Trump's electoral victory.

==== American Indian and Alaska Native voters ====
Pre-election voter surveys by Indian Country Today found 68% of American Indian and Alaska Native voters supporting Democratic nominee Joe Biden. In particular, the Navajo Reservation, which spans a large quadrant of eastern Arizona and western New Mexico, delivered up to 97% of their votes per precinct to Biden, while overall support for Biden was between 60 and 90% on the Reservation. Biden also posted large turnout among Havasupai, Hopi, and Tohono O'odham peoples, delivering a large win in New Mexico and flipping Arizona.

In Montana, while the state went for Trump overall, Biden won counties overlapping reservations of the Blackfeet, Fort Belknap, Crow and Northern Cheyenne. The same pattern held in South Dakota, with most of the counties overlapping the lands of the Standing Rock Sioux, Cheyenne River Sioux, Oglala Sioux, Rosebud Sioux and Crow Creek tribes going for Biden. For example, in Oglala Lakota County, which overlaps with the Pine Ridge Indian Reservation, Biden won 88% of the vote.

Trump's strongest performance among Native tribes was with the Lumbee Tribe of North Carolina, where he won a strong majority in Robeson County and flipped Scotland County from Democratic to Republican. Trump had campaigned in Lumberton, in Robeson County, and had promised the Lumbees federal recognition.

=== Polling accuracy ===
Although polls generally predicted the Biden victory, the national polls overestimated him by three to four points, and some state polling was even further from the actual result and greater than 2016's error (one or two points). The numbers represented the highest level of error since the 1980 presidential election. This polling overestimation also applied in several Senate races, where the Democrats underperformed by about five points relative to the polls, as well as the House elections, where Republicans gained seats instead of losing as polls predicted. Most pollsters underestimated support for Trump in several key battleground states, including Florida, Iowa, Ohio, Pennsylvania, Michigan, Texas, and Wisconsin. The discrepancy between poll predictions and the actual result persisted from the 2016 election despite pollsters' attempts to fix problems with polling in 2016, in which they underestimated the Republican vote in several states. The imprecise polls led to changes in campaigning and fundraising decisions for both Democrats and Republicans.

According to The New York Times, polling misses have been attributed to, among other issues, reduced average response to polling; the relative difficulty to poll certain types of voters; and pandemic-related problems, such as a theory which suggests Democrats were less willing to vote in person on Election Day than Republicans for fear of contracting COVID-19. According to CNN, research presented to the American Association for Public Opinion Research indicated one of the primary problems was an inability by pollsters to include a certain segment of Trump supporters, either due to inaccessibility or lack of participation. New Statesman data journalist Ben Walker pointed to Hispanics as a historically difficult group to poll accurately, leading to pollsters underestimating the level of Trump support within the demographic group. Election analyst Nate Silver of FiveThirtyEight argued that the polling error in 2020 was normal by historical standards.

Siena College Research Institute reported that a significant source of polling error was the discounting of partial responses by "mistrustful Trump supporters" who "yelled" at their callers; when someone would "say 'I'm voting for Trump—fuck you,' and then hang up before completing the rest of the survey," it would not be counted as a response. Such "partials" made up "nearly half of Siena's error rate."

== Aftermath ==
=== Election night ===
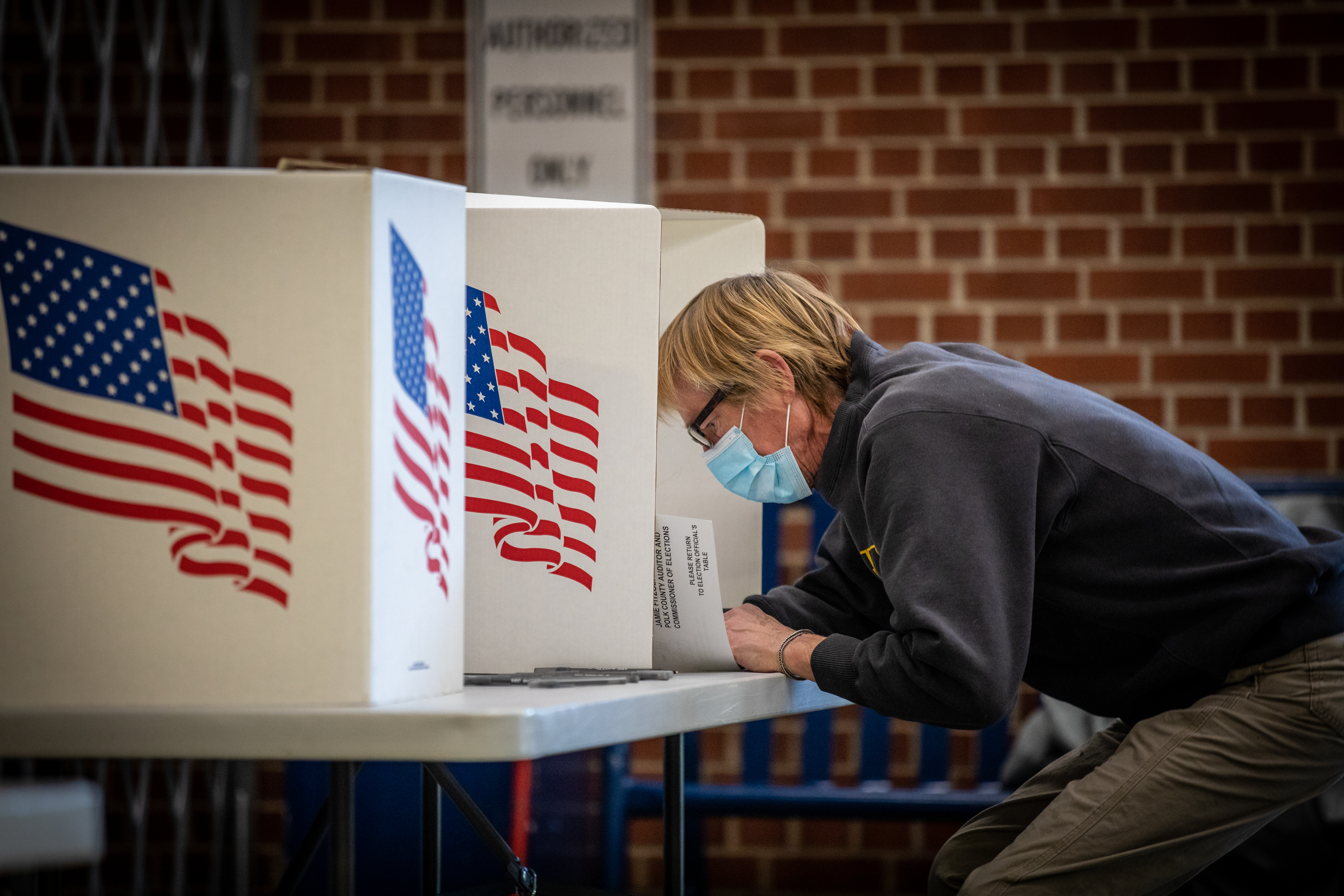
Voters cast ballots at Roosevelt High School in Des Moines, Iowa.

Election night, November 3, ended without a clear winner, as many state results were too close to call and millions of votes remained uncounted, including in the battleground states of Wisconsin, Michigan, Pennsylvania, North Carolina, Georgia, Arizona, and Nevada. Results were delayed in these states due to local rules on counting mail-in ballots. Mail-in ballots became particularly prevalent in the 2020 election due to the widespread outbreak of the COVID-19 pandemic. Over roughly 67 million mail-in ballots were submitted, over doubling the previous election's 33.5 million. In a victory declared after midnight, Trump won the swing state of Florida by over three percentage points, an increase from his 1.2 percentage point margin in 2016, having seen significant gains in support among the Latino community in Miami-Dade County.

Shortly after 12:30 a.m. EST, Biden made a short speech in which he urged his supporters to be patient while the votes are counted, and said he believed he was "on track to win this election". Shortly before 2:30 a.m. EST, Trump made a speech to a roomful of supporters, falsely asserting that he had won the election and calling for a stop to all vote counting, saying that continued counting was "a fraud on the American people" and "we will be going to the U.S. Supreme Court." The Biden campaign denounced these attempts, claiming the Trump campaign was engaging in a "naked effort to take away the democratic rights of American citizens".

=== Late counting ===
In Pennsylvania, where the counting of mail-in ballots began on election night, Trump prematurely declared victory on November 4 with a lead of 675,000 votes, despite more than a million ballots remaining uncounted. Trump also declared victory in North Carolina and Georgia, despite many ballots being uncounted. At 11:20 p.m. EST on election night, Fox News projected Biden would win Arizona, with the Associated Press making the same call at 2:50 a.m. EST on November 4; several other media outlets concluded the state was too close to call. By the evening of November 4, the Associated Press reported that Biden had secured 264 electoral votes by winning Michigan and Wisconsin, with Pennsylvania, North Carolina, Georgia, and Nevada remaining uncalled. Biden had a 1% lead in Nevada and maintained a 2.3% lead in Arizona by November 5, needing only to win Nevada and Arizona or to win Pennsylvania to obtain the necessary 270 electoral votes.

Some Trump supporters expressed concerns of possible fraud after seeing the president leading in some states on Election Night, only to see Biden take the lead in subsequent days. Election experts attributed this to several factors, including a "red mirage" of early results being counted in relatively thinly populated rural areas that favored Trump, which are quicker to count, followed later by results from more heavily populated urban areas that favored Biden, which take longer to count. In some states like Pennsylvania, Michigan and Wisconsin, Republican-controlled legislatures prohibited mail-in ballots from being counted before Election Day, and once those ballots were counted they generally favored Biden, at least in part because Trump had for months raised concerns about mail-in ballots, encouraging his supporters instead to vote in person. By contrast, in states such as Florida, which allowed counting of mail-in ballots for weeks prior to Election Day, an early blue shift giving the appearance of a Biden lead was later overcome by in-person voting that favored Trump, resulting in the state being called for the president on Election Night.

On November 5, a federal judge dismissed a lawsuit by the Trump campaign to stop vote-counting in Pennsylvania. The Trump campaign had alleged that its observers were not given access to observe the vote, but its lawyers admitted during the hearing that its observers were already present in the vote-counting room. Also that day, a state judge dismissed another lawsuit by the Trump campaign which alleged that in Georgia, late-arriving ballots were counted. The judge ruled no evidence had been produced that the ballots were late. Meanwhile, a state judge in Michigan dismissed the Trump campaign's lawsuit requesting a pause in vote-counting to allow access to observers, as the judge noted that vote-counting had already finished in Michigan. That judge also noted the official complaint did not state "why", "when, where, or by whom" an election observer was allegedly blocked from observing ballot-counting in Michigan.

On November 6, Biden assumed leads in Pennsylvania and Georgia as the states continued to count ballots, and absentee votes in those states heavily favored Biden. Due to the slim margin between Biden and Trump in the state, Georgia Secretary of State Brad Raffensperger announced on November 6 that a recount would be held in Georgia. At that point, Georgia had not seen "any widespread irregularities" in this election, according to the voting system manager of the state, Gabriel Sterling.

Also, on November 6, U.S. Supreme Court Justice Samuel Alito issued an order requiring officials in Pennsylvania to segregate late-arriving ballots, amid a dispute as to whether the state's Supreme Court validly ordered a 3-day extension of the deadline for mail-in ballots to arrive. Several Republican attorneys general filed amicus briefs before the U.S. Supreme Court in subsequent days agreeing with the Pennsylvania Republican Party's view that only the state legislature could change the voting deadline.

By November 7, several prominent Republicans had publicly denounced Trump's claims of electoral fraud, saying they were unsubstantiated, baseless or without evidence, damaging to the election process, undermining democracy and dangerous to political stability while others supported his demand of transparency. According to CNN, people close to Donald Trump, such as his son-in-law and senior adviser Jared Kushner and his wife Melania Trump, urged him to accept his defeat. While Donald Trump privately acknowledged the outcome of the presidential election, he nonetheless encouraged his legal team to continue pursuing legal challenges. Trump expected to win the election in Arizona, but when Fox News declared Biden the victor of the state, Trump became furious and claimed the result was due to fraud. Trump and his allies suffered approximately 50 legal losses in four weeks after starting their litigation. In view of these legal defeats, Trump began to employ "a public pressure campaign on state and local Republican officials to manipulate the electoral system on his behalf".

=== Election protests ===
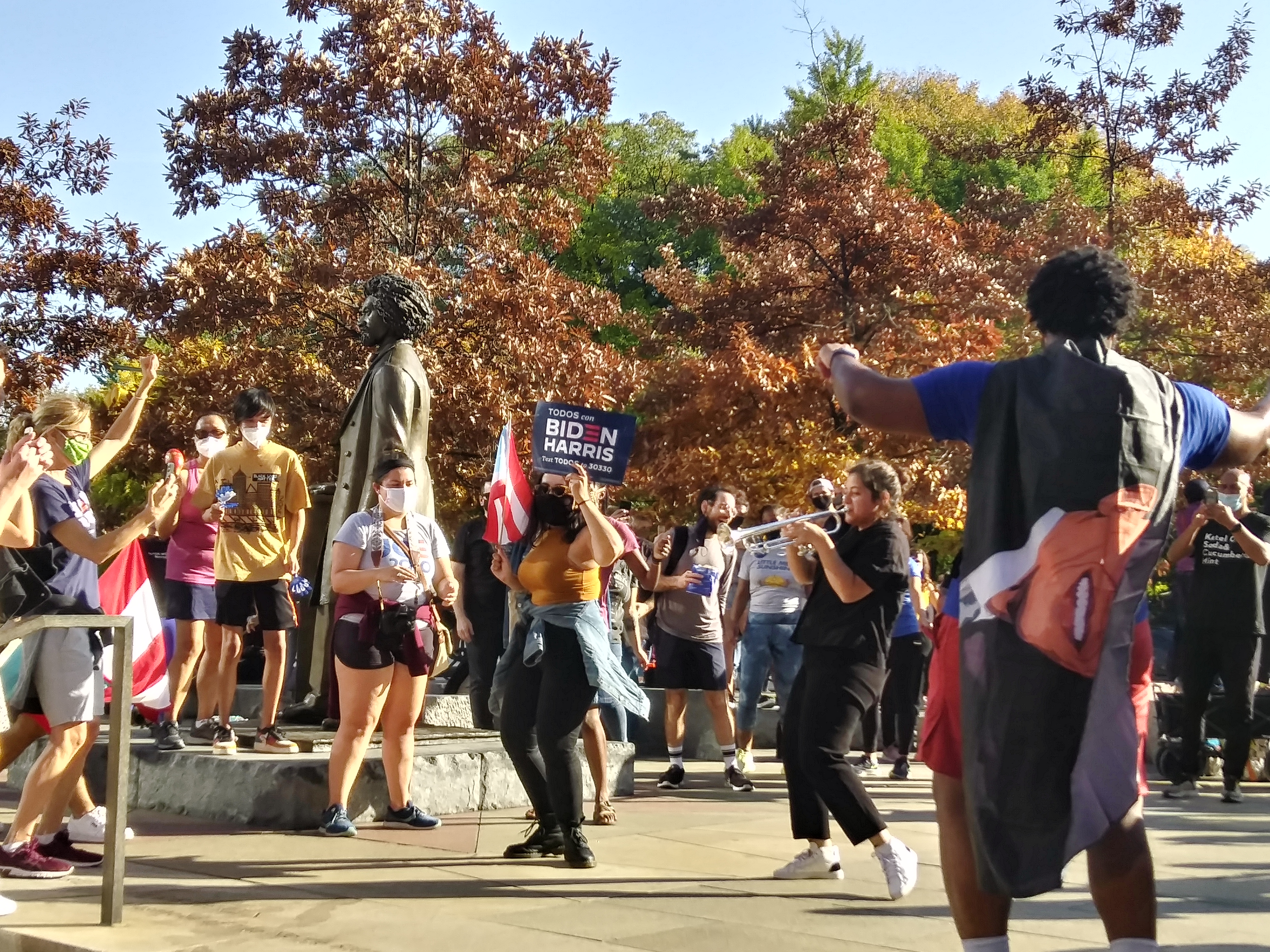
Spontaneous celebration of Trump's loss at Frederick Douglass Circle in New York City on November 7, 2020

Protests against Trump's challenges to the election results occurred in Minneapolis, Portland, New York, and other cities. Police in Minneapolis arrested more than 600 demonstrators for blocking traffic on an interstate highway. In Portland, the National Guard was called out after some protesters smashed windows and threw objects at police. At the same time, groups of Trump supporters gathered outside of election centers in Phoenix, Detroit, and Philadelphia, shouting objections to counts that showed Biden leading or gaining ground. In Arizona, where Biden's lead was shrinking as more results were reported, the pro-Trump protesters mostly demanded that all remaining votes be counted, while in Michigan and Pennsylvania, where Trump's lead shrank and disappeared altogether as more results were reported, they called for the count to be stopped.

=== False claims of fraud ===
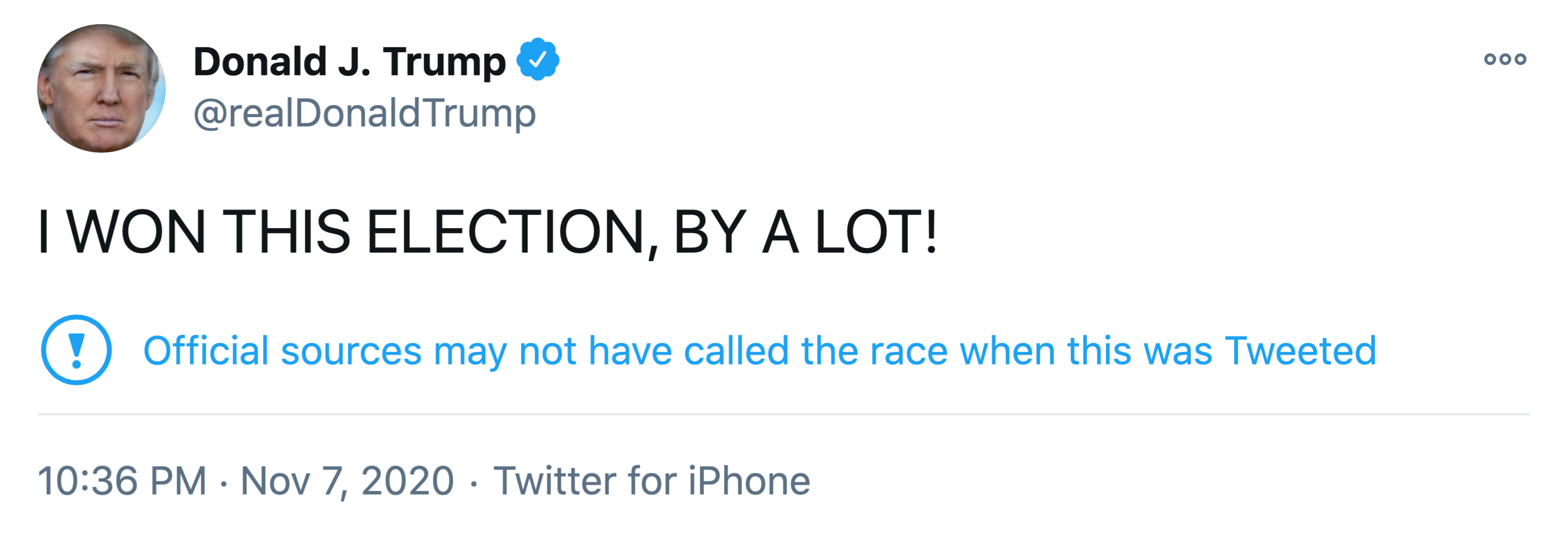
Screenshot of a tweet from Trump's Twitter account in which he repeatedly and falsely claimed he had won

To sow election doubt, Trump escalated use of "rigged election" and "election interference" statements in advance of the 2024 election compared to the previous two elections—the statements described as part of a "heads I win; tails you cheated" rhetorical strategy.

Trump and a variety of his surrogates and supporters made a series of observably false claims that the election was fraudulent. Claims that substantial fraud was committed have been repeatedly debunked. On November 9 and 10, The New York Times called the offices of top election officials in every state; all 45 of those who responded said there was no evidence of fraud. Some described the election as remarkably successful considering the coronavirus pandemic, the record turnout, and the unprecedented number of mailed ballots. On November 12, the Cybersecurity and Infrastructure Security Agency (CISA) issued a statement calling the 2020 election "the most secure in American history" and noting "[t]here is no evidence that any voting system deleted or lost votes, changed votes, or was in any way compromised." Five days later, Trump fired the director of CISA, whom he had appointed in 2018.

As ballots were still being counted two days after Election Day, Trump falsely asserted that there was "tremendous corruption and fraud going on", adding: "If you count the legal votes, I easily win. If you count the illegal votes, they can try to steal the election from us." Trump has repeatedly claimed as suspicious that mail-in ballots showed significantly more support for Biden. This blue shift phenomenon is believed to occur because more Democrats than Republicans tend to vote by mail, and mail ballots are counted after Election Day in many states. Leading up to the 2020 election, the effect was predicted to be even greater than usual, as Trump's attacks on mail-in voting may have deterred Republicans from casting mail ballots.

In early January 2021, Trump falsely proclaimed that he had by rights won all 50 states in the presidential election and a 535 to 3 electoral college victory. On January 2, during his phone call to Brad Raffensperger, the Georgia Secretary of State, Trump said, "As you know, every single state. We won every state; we won every statehouse in the country... But we won every single statehouse." Two days later, on January 4, Trump appeared at a campaign rally in Dalton, Georgia, supporting Republican senators David Perdue and Kelly Loeffler. During his speech at the rally, Trump again asserted that he won "every single state", and "We win every state, and they're going to have this guy [Biden] be President?"

Many claims of purported voter fraud were discovered to be false or misleading. In Fulton County, Georgia, the number of votes affected was 342, with no breakdown of which candidates they were for. A viral video of a Pennsylvania poll worker filling out a ballot was found to be a case of a damaged ballot being replicated to ensure proper counting, while a video claiming to show a man taking ballots illegally to a Detroit counting center was found to show a photographer transporting his equipment. Another video of a poll watcher being turned away in Philadelphia was found to be real, but the poll watcher had subsequently been allowed inside after a misunderstanding had been resolved. A viral tweet claimed 14,000 votes in Wayne County, Michigan, were cast by dead people, but the list of names included was found to be incorrect. The Trump campaign and Fox News commentator Tucker Carlson also claimed a man named James Blalock had voted in Georgia despite having died in 2006, but in fact his 94-year-old widow had registered and voted as Mrs. James Blalock. In Erie, Pennsylvania, a postal worker who claimed the postmaster had instructed postal workers to backdate ballots mailed after Election Day later admitted he had fabricated the claim. Prior to this recantation, Republican senator Lindsey Graham cited the claim in a letter to the Justice Department calling for an investigation, and a GoFundMe page created for the postal worker "patriot" raised $136,000.

Days after Biden had been declared the winner, White House press secretary Kayleigh McEnany asserted without evidence that the Democratic Party was welcoming fraud and illegal voting. Republican former speaker of the House Newt Gingrich stated on Fox News, "I think that it is a corrupt, stolen election." Appearing at a press conference outside a Philadelphia landscaping business as Biden was being declared the winner, Trump's personal attorney Rudy Giuliani asserted without evidence that hundreds of thousands of ballots were questionable. Responding to Giuliani, a spokesperson for Pennsylvania Attorney General Josh Shapiro said: "Many of the claims against the commonwealth have already been dismissed, and repeating these false attacks is reckless. No active lawsuit even alleges, and no evidence presented so far has shown, widespread problems."

One week after the election, Republican Philadelphia city commissioner Al Schmidt said he had not seen any evidence of widespread fraud, stating, "I have seen the most fantastical things on social media, making completely ridiculous allegations that have no basis in fact at all and see them spread." He added that his office had examined a list of dead people who purportedly voted in Philadelphia but "not a single one of them voted in Philadelphia after they died." Trump derided Schmidt, tweeting, "He refuses to look at a mountain of corruption & dishonesty. We win!"

Attorneys who brought accusations of voting fraud or irregularities before judges could not produce valid evidence to support the allegations. In one instance, a Trump attorney sought to have ballot counting halted in Detroit on the basis of a Republican poll watcher's claim that an unidentified person had said ballots were being backdated; Michigan Court of Appeals judge Cynthia Stephens dismissed the argument as "inadmissible hearsay within hearsay". Some senior attorneys at law firms working for Trump, notably Jones Day, expressed concerns that they were undermining the integrity of American elections by advancing arguments without evidence.

Trump and his lawyers Giuliani and Sidney Powell repeatedly made the false claim that the Toronto, Ontario-based firm Dominion Voting Systems, which had supplied voting machines for 27 states, was a "communist" organization controlled by billionaire George Soros, former Venezuelan president Hugo Chávez (who died in 2013), or the Chinese Communist Party, and that the machines had "stolen" hundreds of thousands of votes from Trump. Defamatory rumors about the company circulated on social media, amplified by more than a dozen tweets or retweets by Trump. The disinformation campaign prompted threats and harassment against Dominion employees.

A December 2020 poll showed 77% of Republicans believed widespread fraud occurred during the election, along with 35% of independent voters. Overall, 60% of Americans believed Biden's win was legitimate, 34% did not, and 6% were unsure. Another poll taken in late December showed a similar result, with 62% of Americans polled believing Biden was the legitimate winner of the election, while 37% did not. This split in popular opinion remained largely stable, with a January 10, 2021, poll commissioned by ABC News showing 68% of Americans believed Biden's win was legitimate and 32% did not. These numbers remained largely stagnant, with a June 2021 poll from Monmouth showing 61% believed Biden won fair and square, 32% believed he won due to fraud, and 7% were unsure. More than a year later, public opinion on the matter still remained stagnant, with a poll commissioned by ABC News finding that 65% of Americans believed Biden's win was legitimate, 33% believed it was not legitimate, and 2% were unsure. The same poll also found that 72% of Americans thought the people involved in the attack on the U.S. Capitol on January 6, 2021, were attacking democracy, while 25% thought they were protecting democracy, and 3% were unsure. A March 2022 poll commissioned by the conservative Rasmussen Reports found that 52% of voters think that it is likely that cheating "affected the outcome of the 2020 presidential election." while 40% of voters believe that it is unlikely. 33% say that cheating was very likely, 19% say it was somewhat likely, 13% say it was somewhat unlikely, and 27% say it was very unlikely.

Motivated by the myth of widespread fraud, Republican state lawmakers initiated a push to make voting laws more restrictive.

On December 13, 2024, just over a month after the 2024 United States presidential election, the Public Religion Research Institute published the results of a survey conducted shortly after that election, between November 8 and December 2. The survey focused primarily on the 2024 election but included questions about the claim that the 2020 election was stolen from Trump: 63 percent of Republicans and 31 percent of voters overall still agreed that the 2020 election had been stolen from Trump.

=== Lawsuits ===
After the election, the Trump campaign filed lawsuits in multiple states, including Georgia, Michigan, Nevada, and Pennsylvania. Lawyers and other observers noted the suits were unlikely to affect the outcome. Loyola Law School professor Justin Levitt said, "There's literally nothing that I've seen yet with the meaningful potential to affect the final result." Some law firms moved to drop their representation in lawsuits challenging results of the election.

Trump unsuccessfully sought to overturn Biden's win in Georgia through litigation; suits by the Trump campaign and allies were rejected by both the Georgia Supreme Court and by federal courts. Trump also sought to overturn Biden's win by pressuring Kemp to call a special session of the Georgia General Assembly so state legislators could override the Georgia election results and appoint a pro-Trump slate of electors, an entreaty rebuffed by Kemp.

On December 20, Giuliani filed a petition with the U.S. Supreme Court, asking them to overturn the results of the Pennsylvania election and direct the state legislature to appoint electors. The Supreme Court was regarded as very unlikely to grant this petition, and in any case Biden would still have a majority of Electoral College votes without Pennsylvania. The Court set the deadline for reply briefs from the respondents for January 22, 2021, two days after President Elect Biden's inauguration.

==== Texas v. Pennsylvania ====
On December 9, Ken Paxton, the Attorney General of Texas, filed a lawsuit in the Supreme Court, asking the court to overturn the results in Michigan, Pennsylvania, Wisconsin, and Georgia. Attorneys general of seventeen other states also signed onto the lawsuit. In the House of Representatives, 126 Republicans—more than two-thirds of the Republican caucus—signed an amicus brief in support of the lawsuit. The suit was rejected by the Supreme Court on December 11, due to a lack of standing.

=== Trump's refusal to concede ===
CNN fact checker Daniel Dale reported that through June 9, 2021, Trump had issued 132 written statements since leaving office, of which "a third have included lies about the election"—more than any other subject.

Early in the morning on November 4, with vote counts still going on in many states, Trump claimed he had won: "This is an embarrassment to our country. We were getting ready to win this election, frankly we did win this election." For weeks after the networks had called the election for Biden, Trump refused to acknowledge that Biden had won. Unlike every losing major party presidential candidate before him, Trump refused to formally concede, breaking with the tradition of formal concession started in 1896, when William Jennings Bryan sent a congratulatory telegram to President-elect William McKinley. Biden described Trump's refusal as "an embarrassment".

In the wake of the election, Trump's White House ordered government agencies not to cooperate with the Biden transition team in any way, and the General Services Administration (GSA) refused to formally acknowledge Biden's victory.

Trump finally acknowledged Biden's victory in a tweet on November 15, although he refused to concede and blamed his loss on fraud, stating: "He won because the Election was Rigged." Trump then tweeted: "I concede NOTHING! We have a long way to go."

In a June 2021 interview with Sean Hannity, Trump stated that "we didn't win" and said that he wished President Biden success in international diplomacy, which Forbes declared as Trump "[coming] as close as he's ever been to conceding his 2020 election loss."

=== GSA delays certifying Biden as president-elect ===
Although all major media outlets called the election for Biden on November 7, the head of the General Services Administration (GSA), Trump appointee Emily W. Murphy, refused for over two weeks to certify Biden as the president-elect. Without formal GSA ascertainment of the winner, the official transition process was delayed. On November 23, Murphy acknowledged Biden as the winner and said the Trump administration would begin the transition. Trump said he had instructed his administration to "do what needs to be done" but did not concede, and indicated he would continue his fight to overturn the election results.

=== Attempts to delay or deny election results ===
Texas v. Pennsylvania motion (left), which called for the Supreme Court to nullify the election, and amicus curiae brief from 17 states (right)

In November, Trump focused his efforts on trying to delay vote certifications at the county and state level. On December 2, Trump posted a 46-minute video to his social media in which he repeated his baseless claims that the election was "rigged" and fraudulent, and he called for either state legislatures or courts to overturn the election and allow him to stay in office. He continued to pressure elected Republicans in Michigan, Georgia, and Pennsylvania in an unprecedented attempt to overturn his loss. Some commentators have characterized Trump's actions as an attempted coup d'état or self-coup.

On December 15, the day after the electoral college vote, Republican Senate Majority leader Mitch McConnell, who was previously said he would not recognize the election results, publicly accepted Biden's win, saying, "Today, I want to congratulate President-elect Joe Biden."

A December 18 meeting in the White House discussed Michael Flynn's suggestion to overturn the election by invoking martial law and rerunning the election in several swing states under military supervision. Army Secretary Ryan D. McCarthy and Army Chief of Staff General James McConville later issued a joint statement saying: "There is no role for the U.S. military in determining the outcome of an American election." In a December 20 tweet, Trump dismissed accusations that he wanted to declare martial law as "fake news".

In a December 21 news conference, outgoing attorney general William Barr disavowed several actions reportedly being considered by Trump, including seizing voting machines, appointing a special counsel to investigate voter fraud, and appointing one to investigate Hunter Biden.

=== Plot for state legislatures to choose electors ===
Both before and after the election, Trump and other Republican leaders publicly considered asking certain Republican-controlled state legislatures to select presidential electors favoring Trump, even if Biden won the popular vote in those states. In Pennsylvania, a state which Biden won, the president's personal lawyer Rudy Giuliani asked a federal judge to consider allowing the Republican-controlled state legislature to select electors. Legal experts, including New York University law professor Richard Pildes, have raised numerous legal and political objections to this policy, noting that in various battleground states, Democratic Party members holding statewide office would thwart such efforts, and ultimately Congress would probably reject the votes of legislatively appointed electors over those elected by the voters. Law professor Lawrence Lessig noted that while the Constitution grants state legislatures the power to determine how electors are selected, including the power to directly appoint them, Article II, Section 1, Clause 4 gives Congress the power to determine when electors must be appointed, which they have designated to be Election Day, meaning that legislatures cannot change how electors are appointed for an election after this date. In modern times, most states have used a popular vote within their state as the determining factor in who gets all the state's electors, and changing election rules after an election could also violate the Constitution's Due Process Clause.

=== Pressure on state and local officials ===
As the Trump campaign's lawsuits were repeatedly rejected in court, Trump personally communicated with Republican local and state officials in at least three states, including state legislators, attorneys general, and governors who had supported him during and after the elections. He pressured them to overturn the election results in their states by recounting votes, throwing out certain votes, or getting the state legislature to replace the elected Democratic slate of Electoral College members with a Republican slate of electors chosen by the legislature. In late November, he personally phoned Republican members of two county electoral boards in Michigan, urging them to reverse their vote certifications. He invited members of the Michigan state legislature to the White House, where they declined his suggestion that they choose a new slate of electors. He repeatedly spoke to the Republican governor of Georgia and the secretary of state, demanding that they reverse their state's election results, and retaliating when they did not, strongly criticizing them in speeches and tweets, and demanding that the governor resign.

During the first week of December, Trump twice phoned the speaker of the Pennsylvania state House of Representatives, urging him to appoint a replacement slate of electors; the speaker said he did not have that power but later joined in a letter encouraging the state's representatives in Congress to dispute the results. On January 4 The Washington Post reported that in a phone call on January 2, Trump pressured Georgia secretary of state Brad Raffensperger to overturn the state's result, telling him "I just want to find 11,780 votes" and threatening him with legal action if he did not cooperate. On January 4, 2021, Democratic congressional leaders, believing Trump "engaged in solicitation of, or conspiracy to commit, a number of election crimes," requested the FBI to investigate the incident. In addition, while some House Republicans tried to defend Trump's Georgia call, Democrats began drafting a censure resolution. Two months later The Washington Post acknowledged that they had misquoted Trump, and added a correction to the article. Also on January 2, 2021, Trump took part in a mass phone call with nearly 300 state legislators from Michigan, Pennsylvania, and Wisconsin, in which he urged them to "decertify" the election results in their states.

=== Election recounts ===
On November 11, Georgia Secretary of State Brad Raffensperger ordered a statewide hand recount of the vote in addition to the normal audit process. At the time, Biden held a lead of 13,558 votes. The hand recount was concluded on November 19 and affirmed Biden's lead by 12,284 votes. Therefore, the hand recount netted Trump 1,274 votes. The change in the count was due to a number of human errors, including memory cards that did not upload properly to the state servers, and was not attributable to any fraud in the original tally. The Trump campaign requested a machine recount, which was estimated to cost taxpayers $200,000 in one Georgia county alone. On December 7, Biden was confirmed as the winner of the machine recount requested by Trump's campaign.

On November 18, the Trump campaign wired $3 million to pay for partial recounts in Milwaukee County and Dane County, Wisconsin, where Milwaukee and Madison, the two largest cities in the state and Democratic strongholds, are located. During the recount, Milwaukee County election commissioner Tim Posnanski said several Republican observers were breaking rules by posing as independents. The recount started November 20 and concluded on November 29, increasing Biden's lead by 87 votes.

=== Electoral College votes ===
The presidential electors met in the state capitol of each state and in the District of Columbia on December 14, 2020, and formalized Biden's victory, casting 306 votes for Biden/Harris and 232 votes for Trump/Pence. Unlike the 2016 election, there were no faithless electors. In six swing states won by Biden, groups of self-appointed Republican "alternate electors" met on the same day to vote for Trump. These alternate slates were not signed by the governors of the states they claim to represent, did not have the backing of any state legislature, and have no legal status.

Even after the casting of the electoral votes and rejection of his lawsuits seeking to overturn the election by at least 86 judges, Trump refused to concede defeat. In a speech following the Electoral College vote, Biden praised the resiliency of U.S. democratic institutions and the high election turnout (calling it "one of the most amazing demonstrations of civic duty we've ever seen in our country") and called for national unity. Biden also condemned Trump, and those who backed his efforts to subvert the election outcome, for adopting a stance "so extreme that we've never seen it before – a position that refused to respect the will of the people, refused to respect the rule of law and refused to honor our Constitution" and for exposing state election workers and officials to "political pressure, verbal abuse and even threats of physical violence" that was "simply unconscionable".

=== Certification and January 6th ===
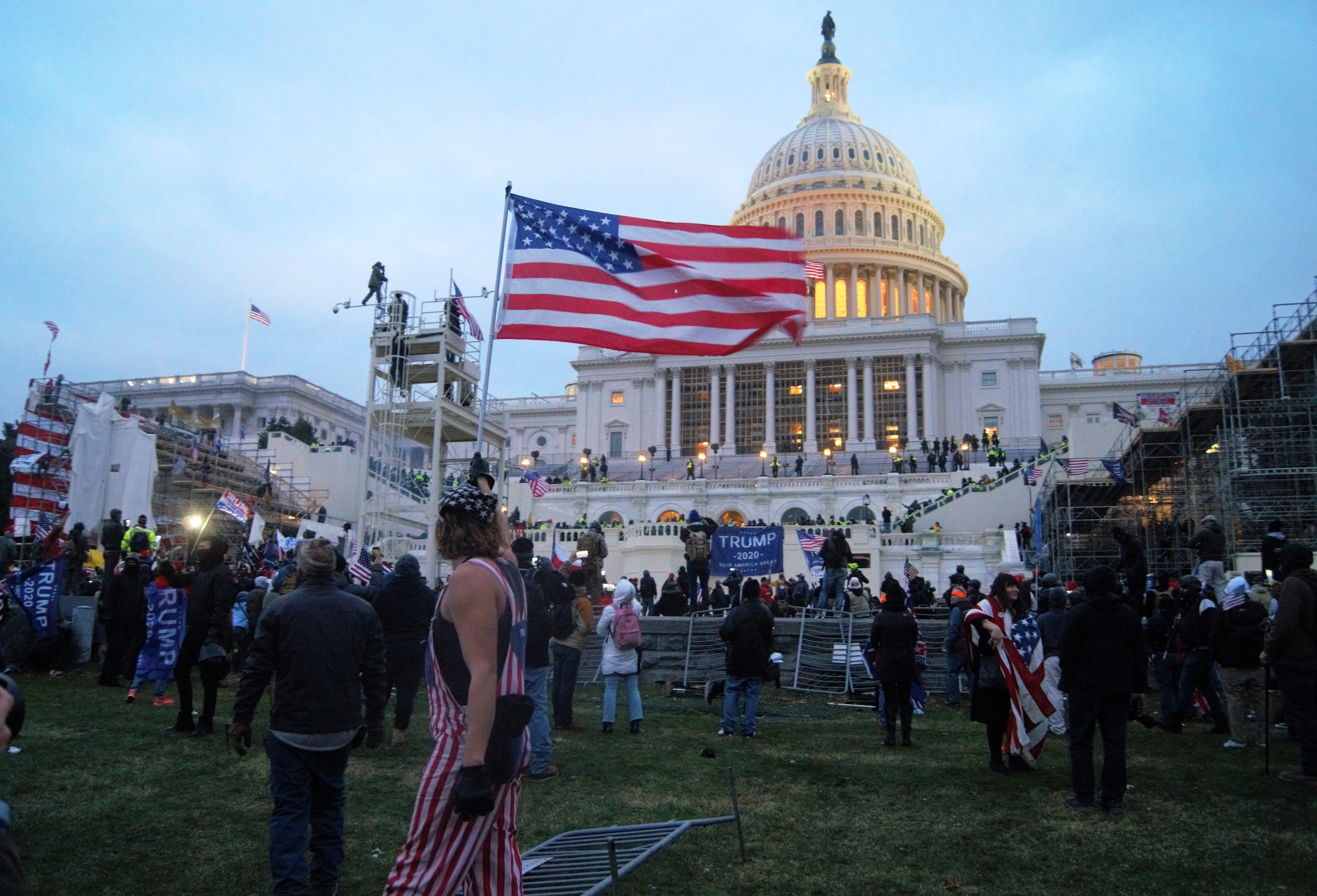
Pro-Trump protesters stormed the U.S. Capitol Building on January 6, 2021.

Joint session of Congress certifying the election results alongside Mike Pence; January 7, 2021

The 117th United States Congress first convened on January 3, 2021, and was scheduled to count and certify the Electoral College votes on January 6, 2021. There were 222 Democrats and 212 Republicans in the House; there were 51 Republicans, 46 Democrats, and two independents in the Senate. Several Republican members of the House and Senate said they would raise objections to the reported count in several states, meeting the requirement that if a member from each body objects, the two houses must meet separately to discuss whether to accept the certified state vote. A statement from the vice president's office said Pence welcomes the plan by Republicans to "raise objections and bring forward evidence" challenging the election results.

On December 28, 2020, Representative Louie Gohmert filed a lawsuit in Texas challenging the constitutionality of the Electoral Count Act of 1887, claiming Vice President Pence has the power and ability to unilaterally decide which slates of electoral votes get counted. The case was dismissed on January 1, 2021, for lack of both standing and jurisdiction. The plaintiffs filed an appeal, and the appeal was dismissed by a three-judge panel of the appeals court the next day.

As vice president, Pence was due to preside over the January 6, 2021, congressional session to count the electoral votes, which is normally a non-controversial, ceremonial event. In January 2021, Trump began to pressure Pence to take action to overturn the election, demanding both in public and in private that Pence use his position to overturn the election results in swing states and declare Trump and Pence the winners of the election. Pence demurred that the law does not give him that power.

Starting in December, Trump called for his supporters to stage a massive protest in Washington, D.C., on January 6 to argue against certification of the electoral vote, using tweets such as "Big protest in D.C. on January 6th. Be there, will be wild!" D.C. police were concerned, and the National Guard was alerted because several rallies in December had turned violent.

On January 6, 2021, shortly after Trump continued to press false claims of election fraud at a rally on the Ellipse in Washington, D.C., a crowd of Trump supporters stormed the United States Capitol, interrupting the Joint session of the United States Congress where the Electoral College ballots were being certified and forcing lawmakers to flee the chamber. As part of an organized effort by Republican lawmakers to challenge the results in close states, the House and the Senate were meeting separately to debate the results of Arizona's election and accepting the electoral college ballots submitted. Several other challenges were also planned. Congress reconvened that same night, after the Capitol was cleared of trespassers, and leaders of both parties, including Vice President Mike Pence, House Speaker Nancy Pelosi, and Senate Speaker Mitch McConnell urged the legislators to confirm the electors. The Senate resumed its session at around 8:00 p.m. to finish debating the objection to the Arizona and Pennsylvania electors were also considered. The joint session completed its work shortly before 4:00 a.m. on Thursday, January 7, declaring Biden and Harris the winners.

The rioters entered the House and Senate chambers and vandalized offices. Five people died as a result: one person was shot by police, one Capitol Police officer died from a stroke after fisticuffs with rioters, one person died of a heart attack, another of a stroke, and the final death is still under investigation. Trump was accused of inciting the violence with his rhetoric, an accusation reinforced with an article of impeachment on January 13 for "incitement of insurrection". Several commentators viewed the attack on the Capitol Building as an indicator of political instability that could lead to political violence in future elections, ranging from domestic terrorism to a second American Civil War.

=== Post-certification ===
On May 10, 2021, over 120 retired U.S. generals and admirals published an open letter alleging that there had been "election irregularities", suggesting that the election had not been "fair and honest" and did not "accurately reflect the "will of the people", and arguing for tighter restrictions on voting. On May 12, 2021, U.S. Representative Liz Cheney was removed from her party leadership role as Chair of the House Republican Conference, partially for continuing to assert that the election had been fair and that the election results were final.

Well into Biden's presidency, Trump continued to insist that he had actually won the 2020 election. As of August 2021, surveys found that a majority of Republicans believe Trump had won the 2020 election. A widespread rumor predicted that Trump would be somehow reinstated to the presidency in August 2021, although the predicted date of August 13 passed without incident.

=== Election audits ===
On March 31, 2021, the Republican caucus of the Arizona State Senate hired several outside firms to examine the results of the presidential and senatorial elections in Maricopa County, where Biden had won by a large margin. There had been three previous audits and recounts of that county's results. The examination was initially funded by $150,000 from the State Senate operating budget; additional funding was to come from outside sources. In July the lead firm conducting the review released a summary of major donors, indicating $5.7 million was raised from five groups associated with individuals who had cast doubt on the presidential election. The audit began on April 22, 2021, and was expected to last 60 days. The investigation was still ongoing in August when a judge issued an order for the release of documents. On September 24, a preliminary release of the audit claimed to have found minor discrepancies in the original, state-certified count, which had actually widened Biden's margin by 360 votes.

=== Trump's letter to Biden ===
On November 10, 2026, Biden revealed that Trump personally hailed him as someone he trusted "will be true to yourself and the American people," even while contesting his loss in the 2020 election and publicly decried the outcome having been stolen from him by Democratic forces.

=== Viewership ===
Legend

Cable news network
Broadcast network

Total television viewers
8:00 to 11:00 p.m. EST

Network	Viewers
Fox News	13,638,000
CNN	9,084,000
MSNBC	7,310,000
ABC	6,095,000
NBC	5,633,000
CBS	4,344,000
Fox	3,278,000

Total cable TV viewers
6:00 p.m. to 3:00 a.m. EST

Network	Viewers
Fox News	10,533,000
CNN	6,771,000
MSNBC	5,404,000

Television viewers 25 to 54
8:00 to 11:00 p.m. EST

Network	Viewers
Fox News	4,901,000
CNN	4,444,000
NBC	2,510,000
MSNBC	2,381,000
ABC	2,283,000
CBS	1,663,000
Fox	1,608,000

Cable TV viewers 25 to 54
6:00 p.m. to 3:00 a.m. EST

Network	Viewers
Fox News	3,853,000
CNN	3,312,000
MSNBC	1,739,000

== See also ==
- 2020 United States gubernatorial elections
- Protests against Donald Trump – Worldwide demonstrations since 2015
- Social media in the 2020 United States presidential election
- Fundraising in the 2020 United States presidential election
