= Statewide opinion polling for the 2020 United States presidential election =

2020 United States presidential election polling
- November 3, 2020

Leading presidential candidate by state or district, based on opinion polls. This map only represents polling data, it is not a prediction for the election.
Joe Biden ▼ Donald Trump
183 33 36 162 44 20 60
Legend
Lead
>15%
10–15%
5–10%
<5%
Leads are based on the average of aggregate polls if available, otherwise on the most recent individual poll if available, otherwise on the result of the previous election.
President before election
Donald Trump
Republican
Elected President
Joe Biden
Democratic

This is a list of statewide public opinion polls that have been conducted relating to the 2020 United States presidential election. The persons named in the polls were declared candidates or received media speculation about their possible candidacy.

If multiple versions of polls are provided, the version among likely voters is prioritized, then registered voters, then adults.

== Polling aggregation in swing states ==
The following graph depicts the difference between Joe Biden and Donald Trump in each swing state in the poll aggregators from March 2020 to the election, with the election results for comparison.

Polls by state or district
New Hampshire
Minnesota
Wisconsin
Michigan
Nevada
Pennsylvania
Nebraska CD-2
Maine CD-2
Arizona
Florida
North Carolina
Georgia
Ohio
Texas
Iowa
Montana
Missouri
Alaska
South Carolina
Nebraska
Kansas

View source data.

== See also ==
- Nationwide opinion polling for the 2020 United States presidential election
- Nationwide opinion polling for the 2020 Democratic Party presidential primaries
- Statewide opinion polling for the 2020 Democratic Party presidential primaries
- Opinion polling for the 2020 Republican Party presidential primaries
- 2020 Democratic National Convention
- 2020 Republican National Convention

== Notes ==
General footnotes

Partisan clients
