= Bust of John F. Kennedy (Kennedy Center) =

Sculpture by Robert Berks

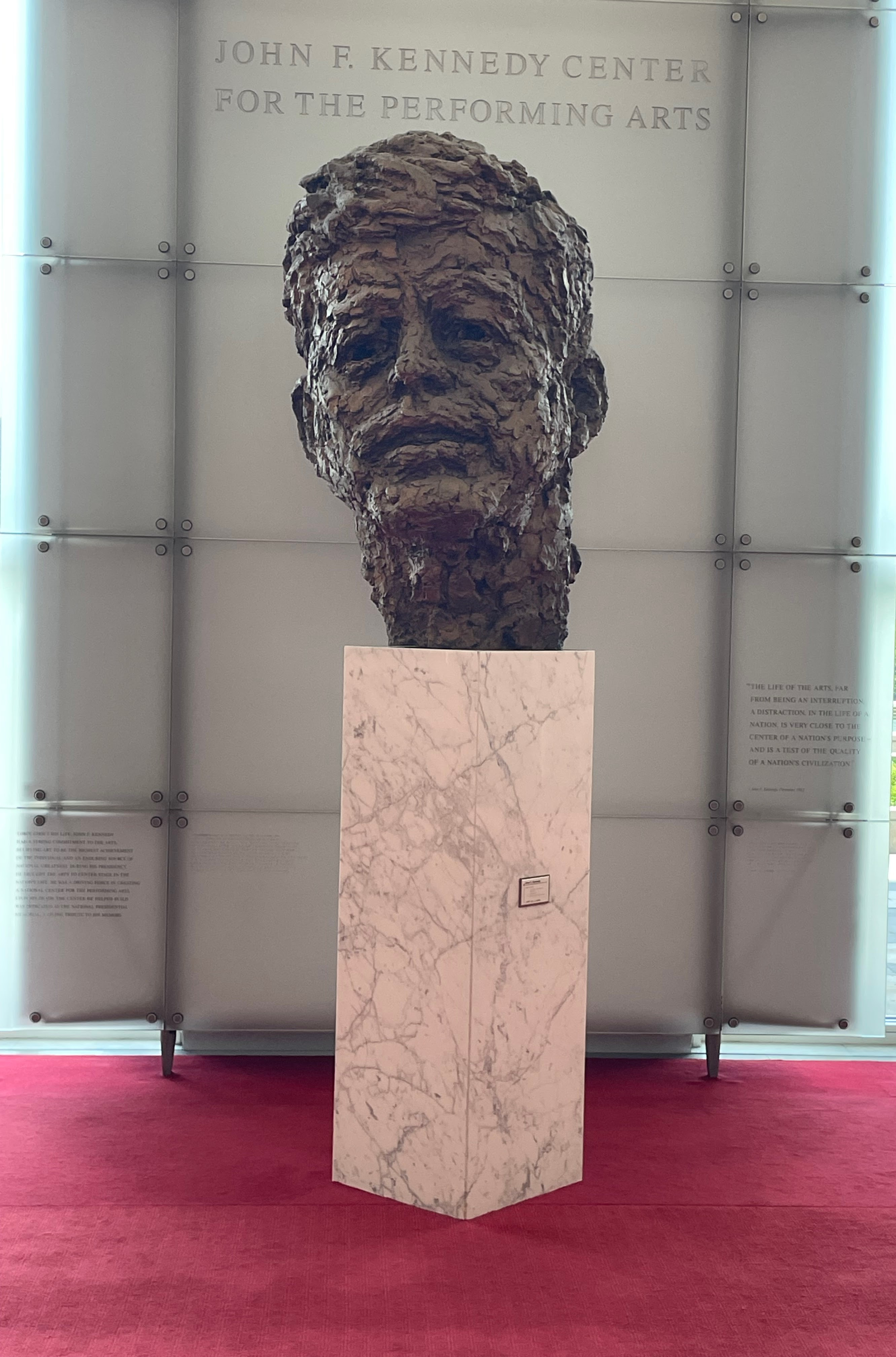
- The bust in May, 2026
- Artist: Robert Berks
- Year: 1971
- Medium: Bronze
- Subject: John F. Kennedy
- Location: Washington, DC, United States

John F. Kennedy is a 1971 bust of the 35th President of the United States, John F. Kennedy, sculpted by Robert Berks. It is located in the Grand Foyer of the John F. Kennedy Center for the Performing Arts in Washington, DC.

== Description ==
The bust is 8-foot (2.4 m) high, made of bronze, and sits on an approximately 10-foot (3.0 m) high travertine marble pedestal. The bust weighs about 3,000 pounds. The inscription on the pedestal's plaque reads:

John F. Kennedy
-------------------
Robert Berks
     35th President of the United States
     Memorial Bust
     Bronze Sculpture
     Gift of Mr. and Mrs. Thomas J. Watson, Jr.

The bust is located in the center of the building's Grand Foyer, opposite the entrance to the Opera House and has been there since the building's opening in September 1971. It is flanked on each side with exhibits entitled "John F. Kennedy, His Life and Legacy", memorializing some of Kennedy's achievements and memorable speeches. It has been described as an iconic symbol and centerpiece of the Kennedy Center.

=== History ===
Two months after President Kennedy's assassination in November 1963, Congress passed and President Lyndon B. Johnson signed Public Law 88-260, designating the John F. Kennedy Center for the Performing Arts as a "living memorial" to Kennedy. When Robert Berks, a noted American sculptor of the time, learned that Kennedy had died, he wanted to memorialize his passing and fashioned a half-life-size bust in his honor. The Kennedy family liked the sculpture, which led to a commission for a larger work for the performing arts center. The work was aided in part by charitable contributions from Mr. and Mrs. Thomas J. Watson, Jr..

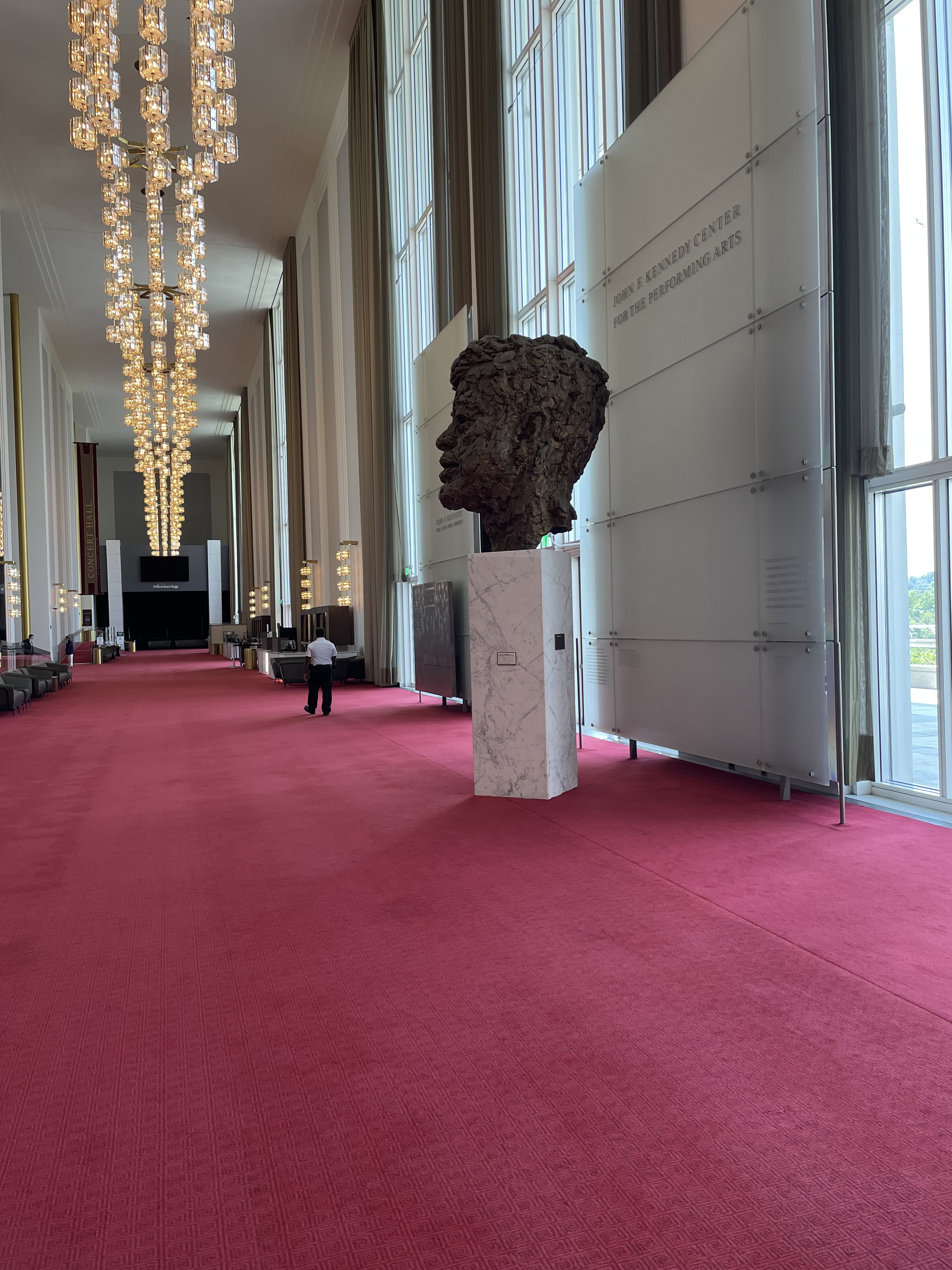
View of the bust and Grand Foyer, toward the Concert Hall

Berks debated the size of the bust. The Grand Foyer of the Center was to be 630 feet (190 m) long. Knowing that a too-small bust would look lost in the space, Berks painted six-, eight-, and ten-foot-high plywood panels, each with a rough image of Kennedy's head. He then placed them in an abandoned potato field marked out to 630 feet near his Long Island home. From this he decided that an eight-foot bust would be the best size.

Berks said of the sculpture: “The size and placement of the bust seem to reduce the scale of the Grand Foyer. You get the feeling that you and the president are totally alone. He fills the place. He is the life force of the center.”

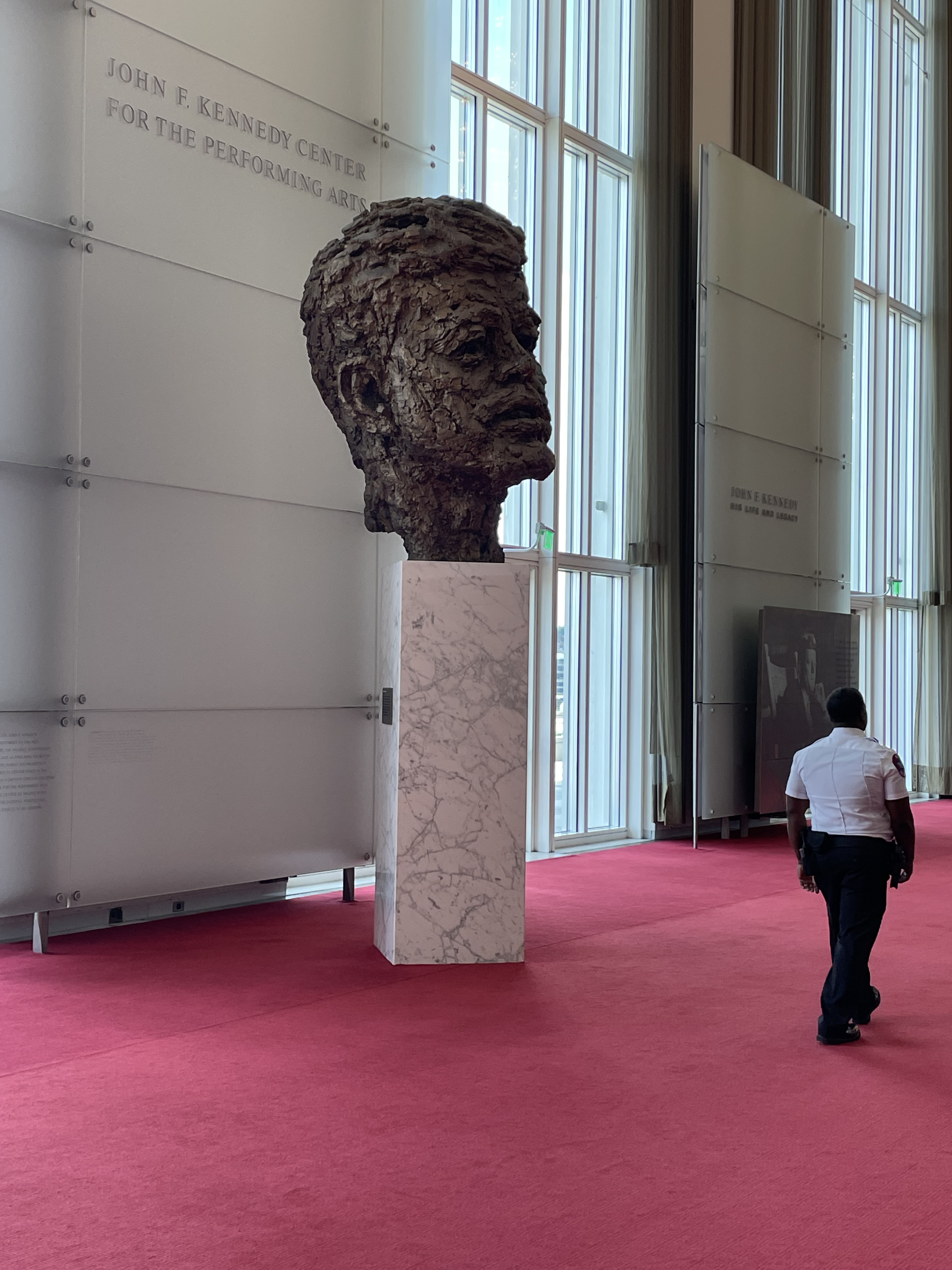
Combined height of pedestal and bust stand approximately 18 feet

Berks said he tried to capture the many moods of Kennedy's personality in one sculpture. His sculptures had a distinctive textured style. As a description in the JFK Presidential Library and Museum put it: "Robert Berks communicates on a grand scale. The facets of Berks's broken surfaces create movement, so that each viewpoint evokes a different aspect of the subject's personality."

The bust was cast in Pietrasanta, Italy and when complete, loaded onto a DC8 at an American air base there and flown to Washington. Berks accompanied it, the only passenger on the plane. The bust was present at the opening night of the Kennedy Center on September 8, 1971. At the dedication Berks said, “The excitement that Kennedy was grips me. I am still deeply moved. If I am to be judged by any one thing, I am willing to be judged by this.”

It is the piece for which he is perhaps best known, despite being a prolific artist who created more than three hundred bronze portraits and more than a dozen monuments, several of which are in Washington, DC.

Berks also made smaller versions of the bust. A replica by Berks is located at the National Library of Medicine in Bethesda, Maryland.

In February 2026, U.S. President Donald Trump announced that the Center would be closing for a two year renovation after July 4, 2026. According to the New York Times, many longtime employees in the building were convinced that the bust would be removed or replaced, and the departing Curator of visual arts and special programming stated that former center Director Richard Grenell instructed him to "get rid of everything" in the Center's permanent art collection, of which the Berks bust was the most significant item. However, several Center executives said in interviews with the New York Times that removal of the bust would not happen.

On May 29, 2026, U.S. District Judge Christopher Cooper, in a 94-page ruling, temporarily blocked the administration from closing the Center for the planned two-year renovation. The judge also ruled that President Trump must remove his name from the Kennedy Center, stating that only Congress had the authority to change the name. On June 12, Trump's name was removed from the building's exterior, although a large tarp was installed which hid the front of the building from view.

On September 15, 2026, Judge Cooper reiterated his ruling that Trump did not have the legal right to put his name on the building. The Board then announced that same day that the Center would close immediately, and it was closed to the public at 4:30 PM. Trump later stated on social media that no renovation of the building would proceed unless his name was put on the building. It was not clear what effect this would have on the bust or other permanent collection objects.

== See also ==
- Cultural depictions of John F. Kennedy
- List of things named after John F. Kennedy
- List of sculptures of presidents of the United States
