= Broadway Center Stage =

Musical series

Broadway Center Stage was a musical series produced by the Kennedy Center from 2017 to 2025.

The productions, which featured the Kennedy Center Opera House Orchestra on stage, were mounted at the Eisenhower Theater as limited engagements of one to two weeks. The series evolved from semi-staged productions to fuller productions.

The series produced two Broadway transfers and one Off-Broadway transfer. The 2018 production of Chess, which featured a revised book by Danny Strong, was later used as the basis for the 2025 Broadway revival of the musical. The 2023 production of Spamalot transferred to Broadway's St. James Theatre, opening November 16, 2023, and subsequently embarked on a national tour. The 2024 production of The 25th Annual Putnam County Spelling Bee transferred Off-Broadway to New World Stages in New York City in late 2025. The final production in the series was a world-premiere stage adaptation of Schmigadoon!, which ran from January 31 to February 9, 2025, then transferred to Broadway's Nederlander Theatre, and opened on April 20, 2026.

== Productions ==
Season	Title	Notable cast
2017–2018	Chess	Raúl Esparza, Ramin Karimloo, Ruthie Ann Miles, Karen Olivo
2017–2018	In the Heights	Anthony Ramos, Vanessa Hudgens, Ana Villafañe, Eden Espinosa
2017–2018	How to Succeed in Business Without Really Trying	Skylar Astin, Betsy Wolfe, Michael Urie, Becki Newton
2018–2019	Little Shop of Horrors	Josh Radnor, Megan Hilty
2018–2019	The Music Man	Norm Lewis, Jessie Mueller, Rosie O'Donnell
2018–2019	The Who's Tommy	Casey Cott, Christian Borle, Mandy Gonzalez
2019–2020	Footloose	J. Quinton Johnson, Isabelle McCalla, Michael Park, Rebecca Luker
2019–2020	Next to Normal	Rachel Bay Jones, Brandon Victor Dixon, Michael Park
2019–2020	Bye Bye Birdie	Canceled due to the COVID-19 pandemic
2022–2023	Guys and Dolls	James Monroe Iglehart, Jessie Mueller, Steven Pasquale, Phillipa Soo, Rachel Dratch
2022–2023	Sunset Boulevard	Stephanie J. Block
2022–2023	Spamalot	James Monroe Iglehart, Alex Brightman, Leslie Kritzer, Rob McClure; transferred to Broadway, November 2023
2023–2024	tick, tick... BOOM!	Brandon Uranowitz, Denée Benton, Grey Henson; directed by Neil Patrick Harris
2023–2024	Bye Bye Birdie	Christian Borle, Krysta Rodriguez, Ephraim Sykes
2023–2024	Nine	Steven Pasquale, Shereen Ahmed, Carolee Carmello, Elizabeth Stanley, Mary Elizabeth Mastrantonio
2024–2025	The 25th Annual Putnam County Spelling Bee	Beanie Feldstein, Kevin McHale, Taran Killam, Bonnie Milligan, Noah Galvin; transferred Off-Broadway, 2025
2024–2025	Schmigadoon!	World premiere stage production; transferred to Broadway, April 2026
