= Robert Berks =

American sculptor (1922–2011)

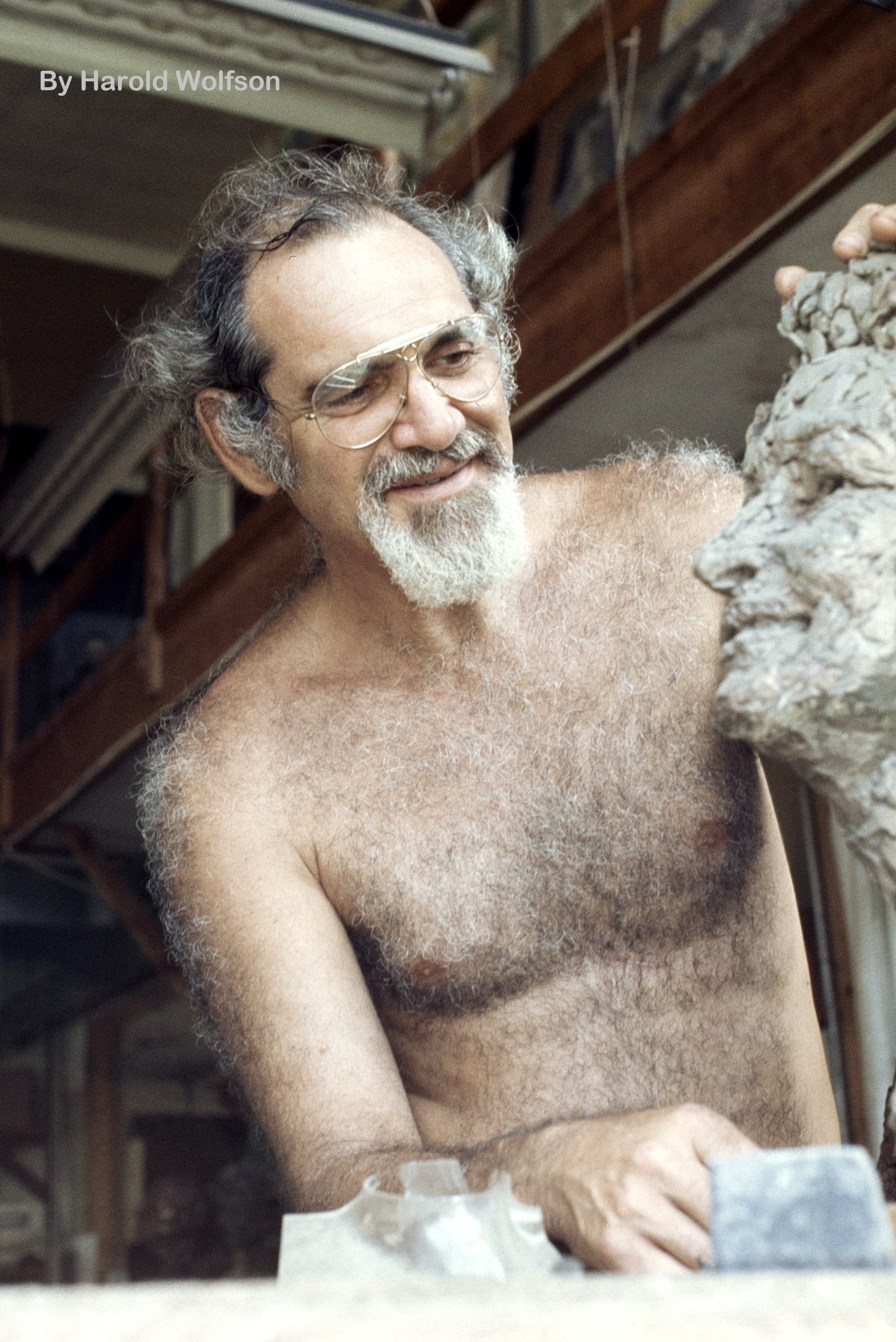
- Bob Berks in his studio, Orient, NY By Harold Wolfson
- Born: Robert S. Berks; April 26, 1922; Boston, Massachusetts, US
- Died: May 16, 2011 (aged 89); New York City, US
- Occupation: Sculptor
- Known for: John F. Kennedy bust
- Spouse: Dorothy "Tod" Berks
- Children: 3

Robert "Bob" Berks (April 26, 1922 – May 16, 2011) was an American sculptor, industrial designer and planner. He created hundreds of bronze sculptures and monuments including the Mary McLeod Bethune Memorial, and the Albert Einstein Memorial in Washington, D.C. Berks was prolific and created numerous sketches, drawings, and paintings; often in service of sculpture and site-planning subjects. He worked for over 50 years in a converted schoolhouse on the north fork of Long Island, NY. For projects with living subjects, Berks would often invite individuals to visit with him and his wife, Tod, for a period of a week or two so he could observe them in real life; through this time he captured emotions, tendencies, facial expressions, and body language. It was this commitment to understanding his subject below the surface that facilitated the intimacy and personality found in his sculptural portraits. Berks's work is spread around the world, but he is best known for his commissions in Washington DC. Berks is one of the only artists in the world to have multiple pieces regularly on display in the Oval office. Depending on the desires of the sitting US President, Berks' busts of famed civil servants and civil rights leaders line the walls of the Oval (Eight (8) original works are owned by the National Gallery); most often on view are busts of FDR, Lincoln, RFK, Ronald Reagan, and JFK.

The large 8 foot bust of John F. Kennedy in the Kennedy Center, is most commonly recognized given the reach of televised programs including the annual Kennedy Center honors and The Mark Twain Prize. In the 1960's, Berks was named "The Capitol's Michelangelo" for his bronze monuments around the mall.

== Life ==
He grew up in Hecht House, Boston. He studied at the Boston Museum. In 1953, he married Dorothy “Tod” Berks.

One of Berks's most famous works is a bust of former President John Fitzgerald Kennedy that can be found in the Grand Foyer of The John F. Kennedy Center for the Performing Arts in Washington, DC.

Berks created the Albert Einstein Memorial, a monumental bronze statue depicting Albert Einstein seated with manuscript papers in hand. It is located in central Washington, D.C., United States, on the grounds of the National Academy of Sciences. In 2005, he donated a sculpture of Einstein to Princeton University.

A copy of his Bust of Abraham Lincoln was displayed in the Oval Office by President Clinton, who also displayed Berk's FDR bust on the Resolute Desk. During the Presidency of Joe Biden, the Oval Office was home to Berk's bust of Robert F. Kennedy.

Another of his statues, that of the Swedish botanist and physician Carl Linnaeus, can be found in the Heritage Garden of the Chicago Botanic Garden in Glencoe, Illinois. Berks life-size bust of Enrico Fermi, completed in 1966, resides at the Linda Hall Library.

In 2007, he completed a sculpture of Fred Rogers for Pittsburgh.

He died on May 16, 2011, at the age of 89 from natural causes.

== Notable works ==
Selected works

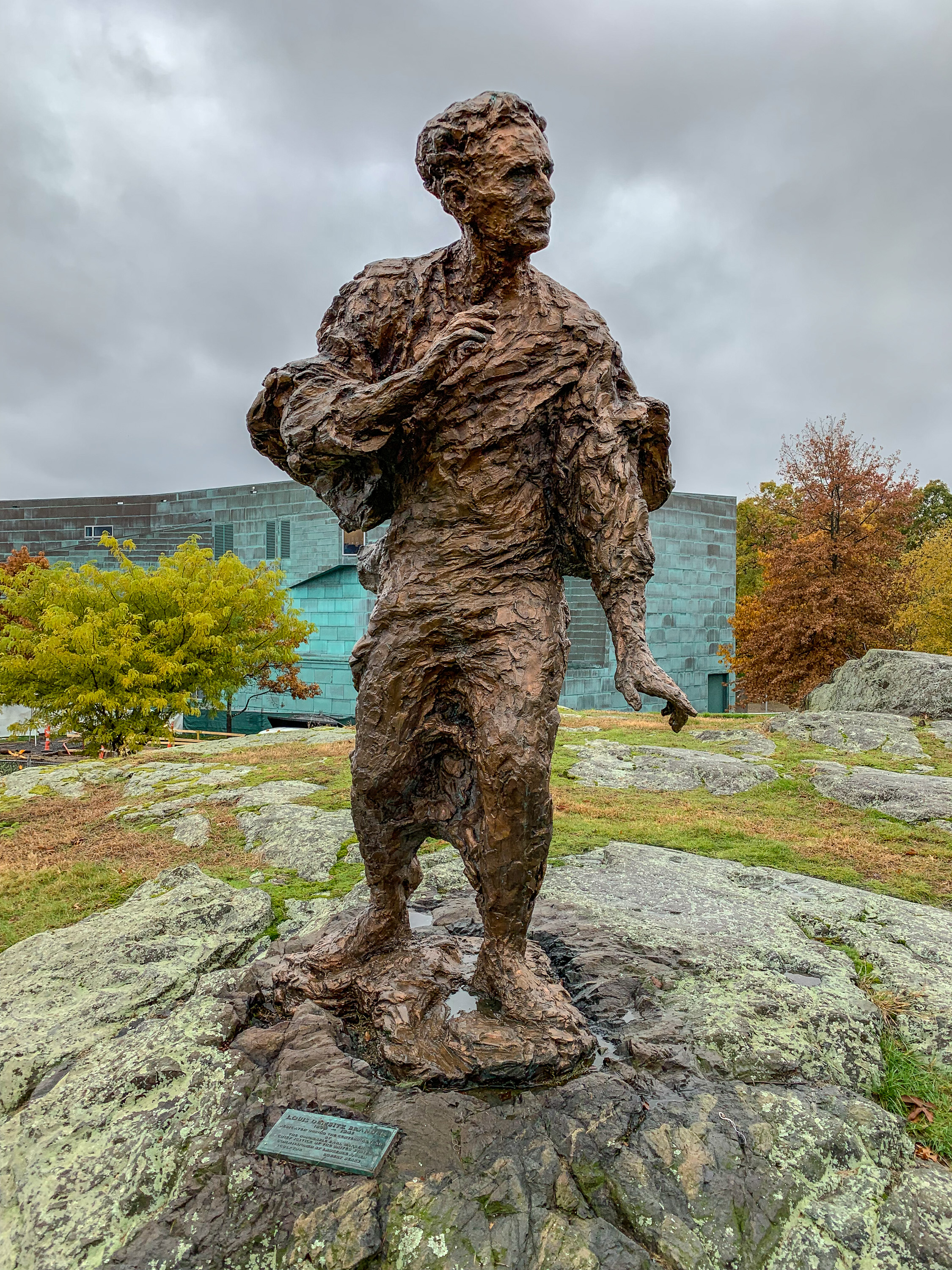
Louis Brandeis statue at Brandeis University (1956)

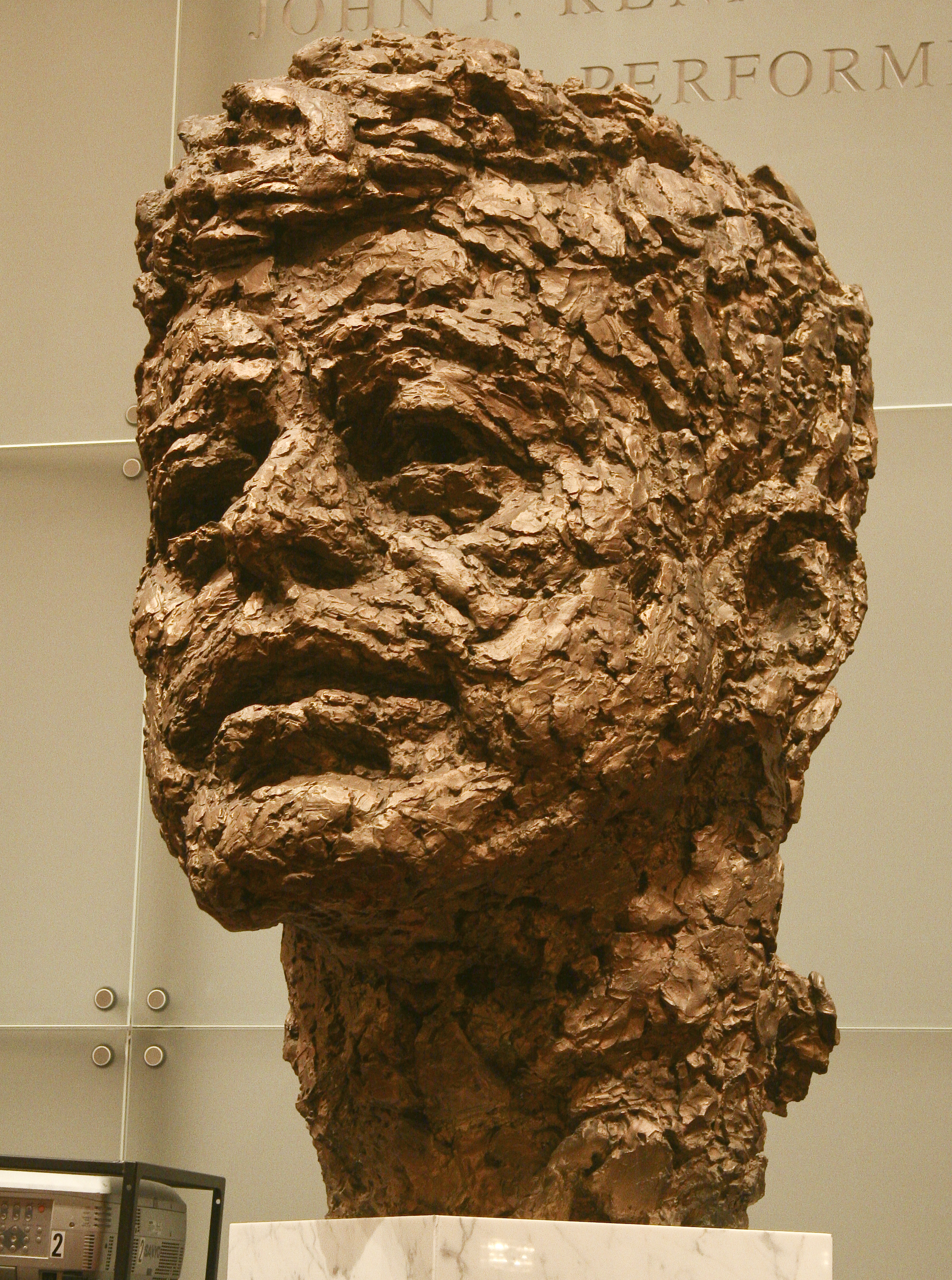
Bust of John F. Kennedy located at the Kennedy Center (1971)

- Louis Dembitz Brandeis Sculpture, Brandeis University, Waltham, Massachusetts, 1956
- Abraham Lincoln bust, 1958
- Richard Caliguiri Memorial, Pittsburgh City-County Building Pittsburgh, Pennsylvania
- Robert F. Kennedy bust, Smithsonian Institution, 1968
- Robert F. Kennedy Memorial, Department of Justice Washington, DC, 1969
- John F. Kennedy bust, Kennedy Center Washington, DC, 1971
- Mary McLeod Bethune Memorial, Lincoln Park, Washington, DC, 1974
- Albert Einstein Memorial, National Academy of Sciences, Washington, DC, 1979
- Carl Linnaeus Monument, Chicago Botanic Garden, Glencoe, Illinois, 1983
- Reinhold Niebuhr Memorial, Elmhurst College, 1997
- Albert Einstein statue, Princeton, NJ, 2005
- Fred Rogers Memorial, Pittsburgh, Pennsylvania, 2009
- Albert Einstein Memorial, Georgia Institute of Technology, Atlanta, GA, 2015

== Sources ==
- James M. Goode: Outdoor Sculpture of Washington D.C. Smithsonian Institution Press, 1979, ISBN 0-87474-138-6
