= Kennedy Center =

National cultural center of the United States

John F. Kennedy Center for the Performing Arts

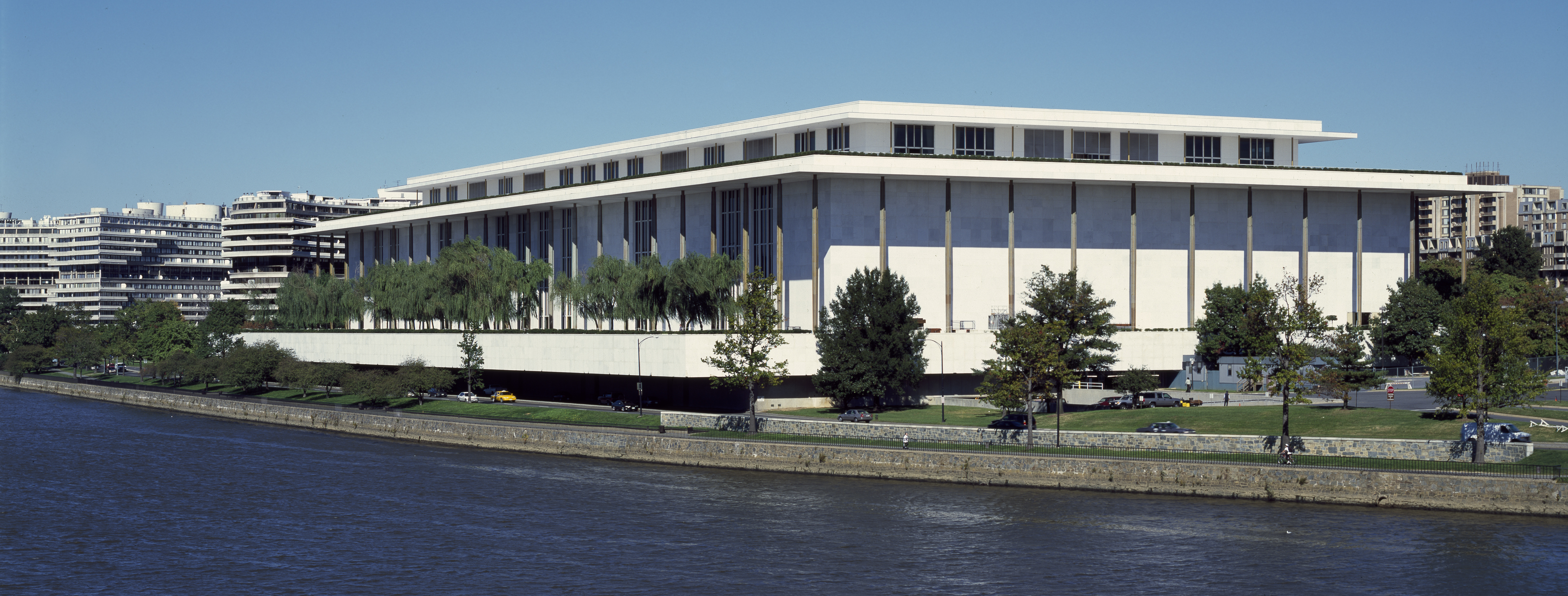
- The Kennedy Center seen from the Potomac River

- Location within Central Washington, D.C. Location within the United States
- Address: 2700 F Street, NW
- Location: Washington, D.C., United States
- Coordinates: 38.8957°N 77.0559°W
- Owner: United States government
- Operator: Kennedy Center Board of Trustees: Donald Trump, Chairman
- Capacity: Concert Hall: 2,465; Eisenhower Theater: 1,161; Family Theater: 320; Jazz Club: 160; Millennium Stage: 235; Opera House: 2,347; Terrace Theater: 490; Theater Lab: 398
- Type: Performing arts center
- Public transit: Washington Metro at Foggy Bottom–GWU (via Kennedy Center shuttle); Metrobus: D10

Construction
- Groundbreaking: December 2, 1964
- Opened: September 8, 1971
- Architect: Edward Durell Stone
- Structural engineer: Severud Associates
- General contractor: John McShain

Tenant
- National Symphony Orchestra

Website
- kennedy-center.org

The John F. Kennedy Center for the Performing Arts, commonly known as the Kennedy Center, is a cultural center located on the eastern bank of the Potomac River in Washington, D.C. It is considered the national cultural center of the United States, serving as a "living memorial" to John F. Kennedy. The center opened on September 8, 1971, and hosts many genres of performance art, spanning theater, ballet, modern dance, classical music, jazz, pop, psychedelic, and folk music. The Kennedy Center is the residence of the National Symphony Orchestra.

Authorized by the National Cultural Center Act of 1958, which requires that its programming be sustained through private funds, the center represents a public–private partnership. Its activities include educational and outreach initiatives, almost entirely funded through ticket sales and gifts from individuals, corporations, and private foundations. The center receives annual federal funding to cover building maintenance and operations.

The original building, designed by Edward Durell Stone, is administered as a bureau of the Smithsonian Institution. An extension designed by Steven Holl opened in 2019. In 1968, George London became the Kennedy Center's first executive director. In 1991, Lawrence Wilker became its first president. In 2014, Deborah Rutter became its third president and the first woman to hold the post.

In 2025, President Donald Trump dismissed the center's trustees and replaced them with people who elected him chairman and voted to add his name to the center, a move later determined to be illegal. Consequently, ticket sales declined, dozens of performances were canceled, and the Washington National Opera ended its half-century of residence. In February 2026, Trump said that the center would close in July for two years of renovations. In May 2026, U.S. district judge Christopher R. "Casey" Cooper blocked the Kennedy Center from closing during its renovations and ordered that Trump's name be removed from the building, which occurred on June 13, 2026. In September 2026, Trump threatened to demolish the building unless his name was returned to the facade.

== History ==
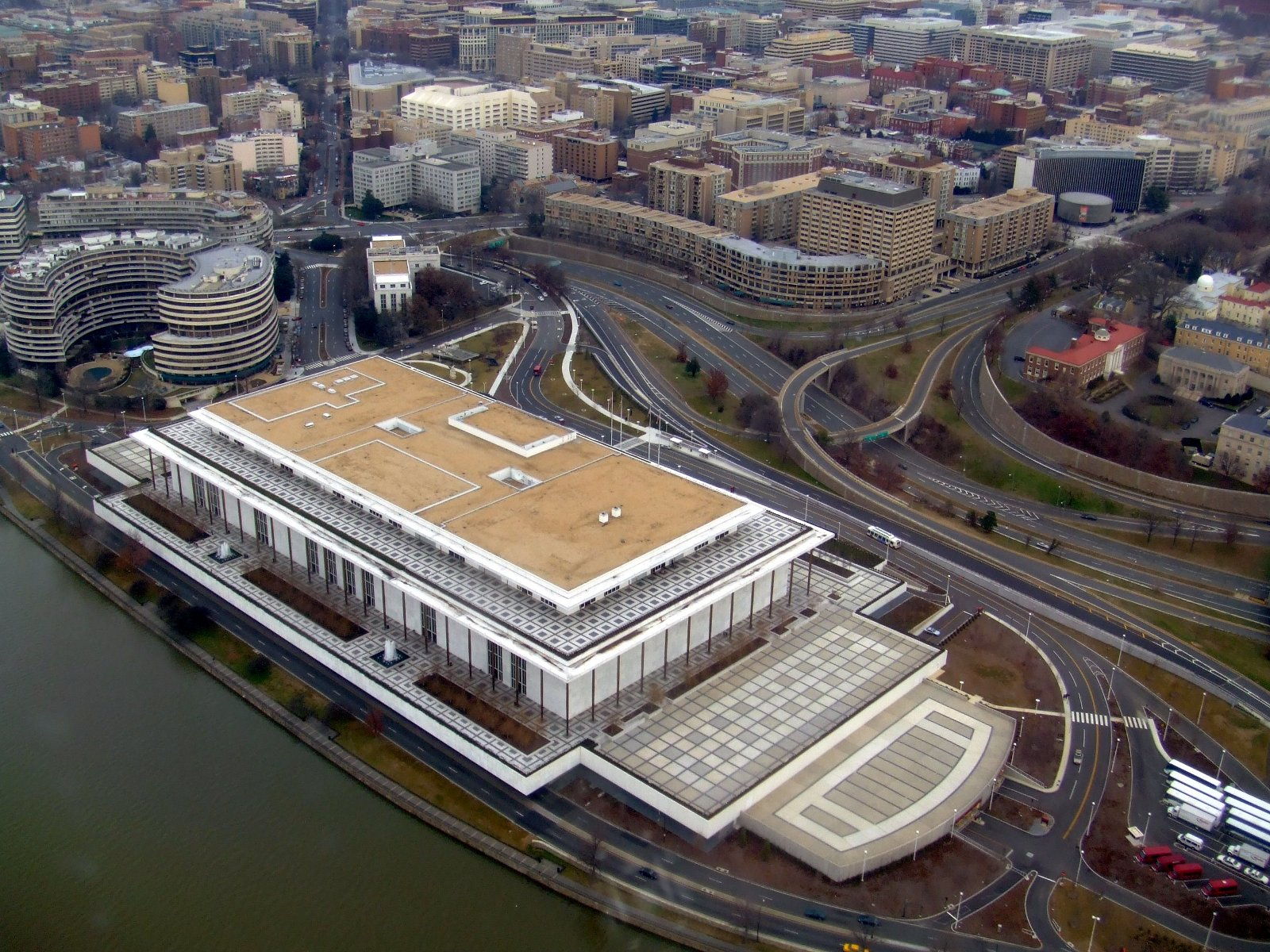
The Kennedy Center as seen from the air on January 8, 2006, before construction of the REACH expansion. A portion of the Watergate complex can be seen at the left.

The idea for a national cultural center dates to 1933 when First Lady Eleanor Roosevelt discussed ideas for the Emergency Relief and Civil Works Administration to alleviate unemployment among American thespians during the Great Depression. Congress held hearings in 1935 for plans to establish a Cabinet-level "Department of Science, Art and Literature", and to build a monumental theater and arts building on Capitol Hill near the Supreme Court building. A 1938 Congressional resolution called for the construction of a "public building which shall be known as the National Cultural Center" near Judiciary Square, but this never materialized.

The idea for a national theater resurfaced in 1950, when U.S. representative Arthur George Klein of New York introduced a bill to authorize funds to plan and build a cultural center. The bill included provisions that the center would prohibit any discrimination of cast or audience. In 1955, the Stanford Research Institute was commissioned to select a site and provide design suggestions for the center. From 1955 to 1958, Congress debated the idea amid much controversy. A bill was finally passed in Congress in the summer of 1958, and on September 4, President Dwight D. Eisenhower signed the National Cultural Center Act into law, which provided momentum for the project.

This was the first time that the federal government helped finance a structure dedicated to the performing arts. The legislation required a portion of the costs, estimated at $10–25 million, to be raised within five years of the bill's passage. Edward Durell Stone was selected as architect for the project in June 1959. He presented preliminary designs to the President's Music Committee in October 1959, along with estimated costs of $50 million, double the original estimates of $25–30 million. By November 1959, estimated costs had escalated to $61 million. Despite this, Stone's design was well received in editorials in The Washington Post and Washington Star, and was quickly approved by the United States Commission of Fine Arts, National Capital Planning Commission, and the National Park Service.

=== Fundraising ===
The National Cultural Center Board of Trustees, a group President Eisenhower established on January 29, 1959, led fundraising. Fundraising efforts were not successful, with only $13,425 raised in the first three years. President John F. Kennedy was interested in bringing culture to the nation's capital, and provided leadership and support for the project. In 1961, Kennedy asked Roger L. Stevens to help develop the National Cultural Center, and serve as chairman of the board of trustees. Stevens recruited First Lady Jacqueline Kennedy as the center's honorary chairman, and former first lady Mamie Eisenhower as co-chairman.

In January 1961, Jarold A. Kieffer became the first executive director of the National Cultural Center, overseeing numerous fundraising efforts and assisting with the architectural plan. At the time of the assassination of President Kennedy, the National Cultural Center had only raised $13 million. Its board then re-envisioned the project as a "living memorial" to him, and Congress renamed it the John F. Kennedy Center for the Performing Arts in 1964.

The total cost of construction was $70 million. Congress allocated $43 million for construction costs, including $23 million as an outright grant and the other $20 million in bonds. Donations also comprised a significant portion of funding, including $5 million from the Ford Foundation, and approximately $500,000 from the Kennedy family. Other major donors included J. Willard Marriott, Marjorie Merriweather Post, John D. Rockefeller III, and Robert W. Woodruff, as well as many corporate donors. Foreign countries provided gifts to the Kennedy Center, including a donation from the Italian government of 3,700 tons of Carrara marble mined from the Apuan Alps (worth $1.5 million). The marble slabs, "each roughly 8 feet by 4 feet and 5 inches thick", according to The New York Times, were installed between 1968 and 1970 and used for the facade and interior walls. It was sourced from the Bufalini family quarry, a supplier favored by Kennedy Center architect Edward Durell Stone.

=== Construction ===
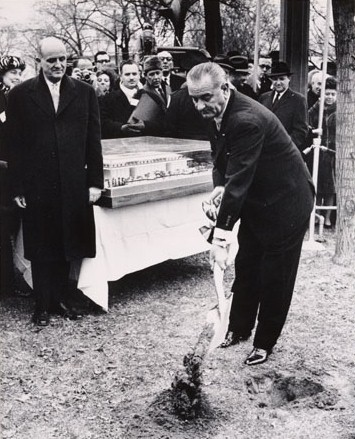
Roger L. Stevens (left) watches as President Lyndon B. Johnson breaks ground December 2, 1964.

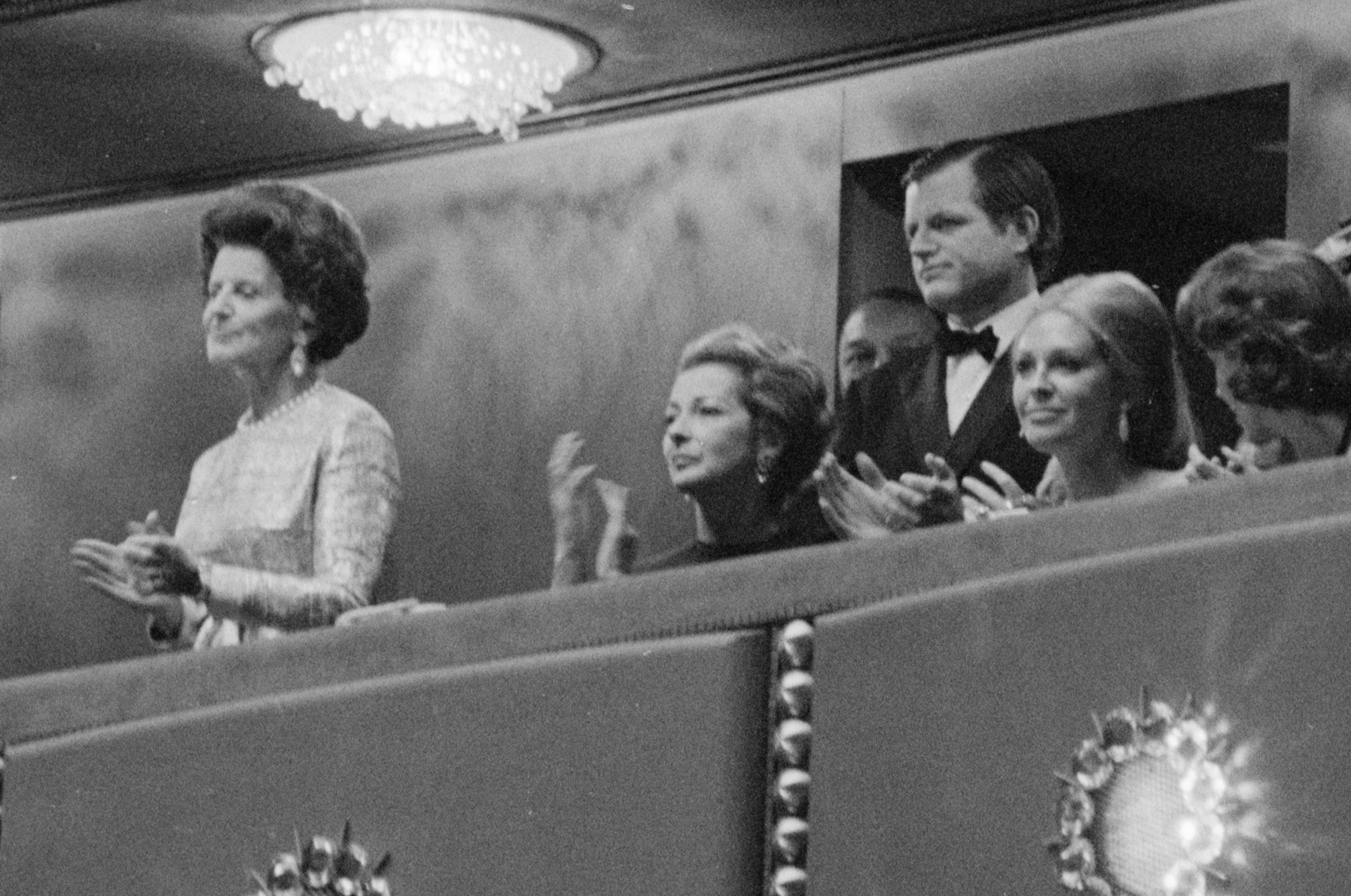
Rose Kennedy and Ted Kennedy in the presidential box during the center's opening gala on September 8, 1971

President Lyndon B. Johnson dug the ceremonial first shovel of earth at the groundbreaking for the Kennedy Center on December 2, 1964. However, debate continued for another year over the Foggy Bottom site, with some advocating for another location on Pennsylvania Avenue. Excavation of the site got underway on December 11, 1965, and the site was cleared by January 1967.

The first performance was September 5, 1971, with 2,200 members of the general public in attendance to see a premiere of Leonard Bernstein's Mass in the Opera House, while the center's official opening took place September 8, 1971, with a formal gala and premiere performance of the Bernstein Mass. The Concert Hall was inaugurated September 9, 1971, with a performance by the National Symphony Orchestra conducted by Antal Doráti. Alberto Ginastera's opera, Beatrix Cenci premiered at the Kennedy Center Opera House September 10, 1971. The Eisenhower Theater was inaugurated October 18, 1971, with a performance of A Doll's House starring Claire Bloom.

=== Renovations and expansion ===
On June 16, 1971, Congress authorized appropriations for one year to the board of trustees for operating and maintenance expenses. In the following years, the appropriations were provided to the National Park Service for operations, maintenance, security, safety, and other functions not directly related to the performing arts activities. The National Park Service and the Kennedy Center signed a cooperative agreement requiring each party to pay a portion of the operating and maintenance costs based on what proportion of time the building was to be used for performing arts functions. The agreement did not specify who was responsible for long-term capital improvement projects at the Kennedy Center, and it provided only periodic funding from Congress for one-time projects.

=== 1990–2008 ===
In fiscal years 1991 and 1992, Congress recommended that $27.7 million be allocated for capital improvement projects at the center, including $12 million for structural repairs to the garage and $15.7 million for structural and mechanical repairs, as well as projects for improving handicapped access. In 1994, Congress gave full responsibility to the Kennedy Center for capital improvement projects and facility management.

From 1995 to 2005, over $200 million of federal funds were allocated to the Kennedy Center for long-term capital projects, repairs, and to bring the center into compliance with modern fire safety and accessibility codes. Improvements included renovation of the Concert Hall, Opera House, plaza-level public spaces, and a new fire alarm system. The renovations projects were completed 13 to 50 percent over budget, due to modifications of plans during the renovations resulting in overtime and other penalties. Renovations to the Eisenhower Theater were completed in 2008.

=== 2013–2024 ===
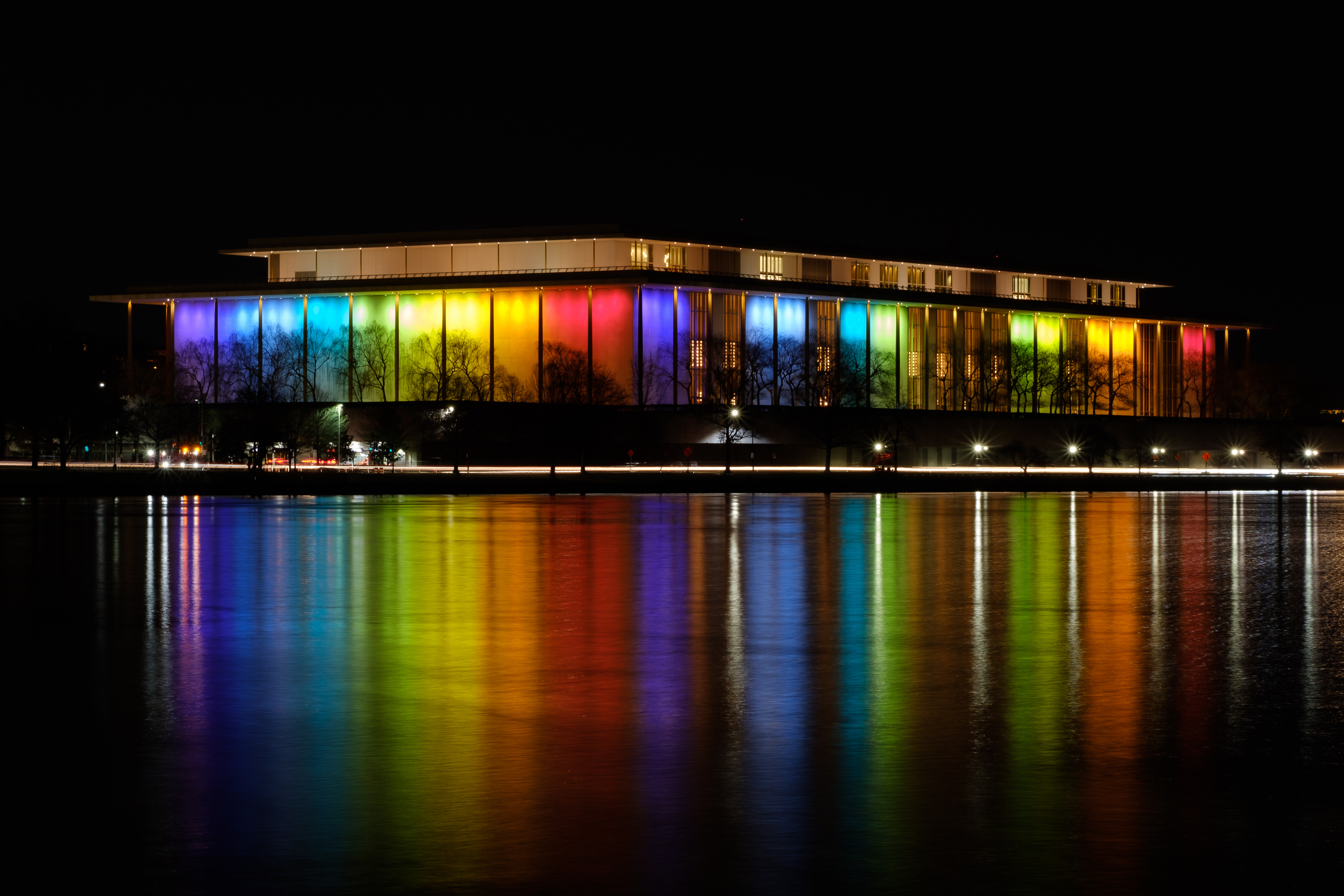
The Kennedy Center lights up in rainbow colors every year in the weeks preceding the annual Kennedy Center Honors.

Beginning in 2013, the center commenced a 60,000-square-foot (5,600 m^{2}) expansion project on four acres (1.6 ha) in the center's South Plaza. The expansion added classroom, rehearsal, and performance space and includes three pavilions (the Welcome Pavilion, the Skylight Pavilion, and the River Pavilion), a reflecting pool, a tree grove, a sloping lawn to be used for outdoor performances, and a pedestrian bridge over Rock Creek Parkway. The architect is Steven Holl, with assistance from architectural firm BNIM. Edmund Hollander Landscape Architects is the landscape architect.

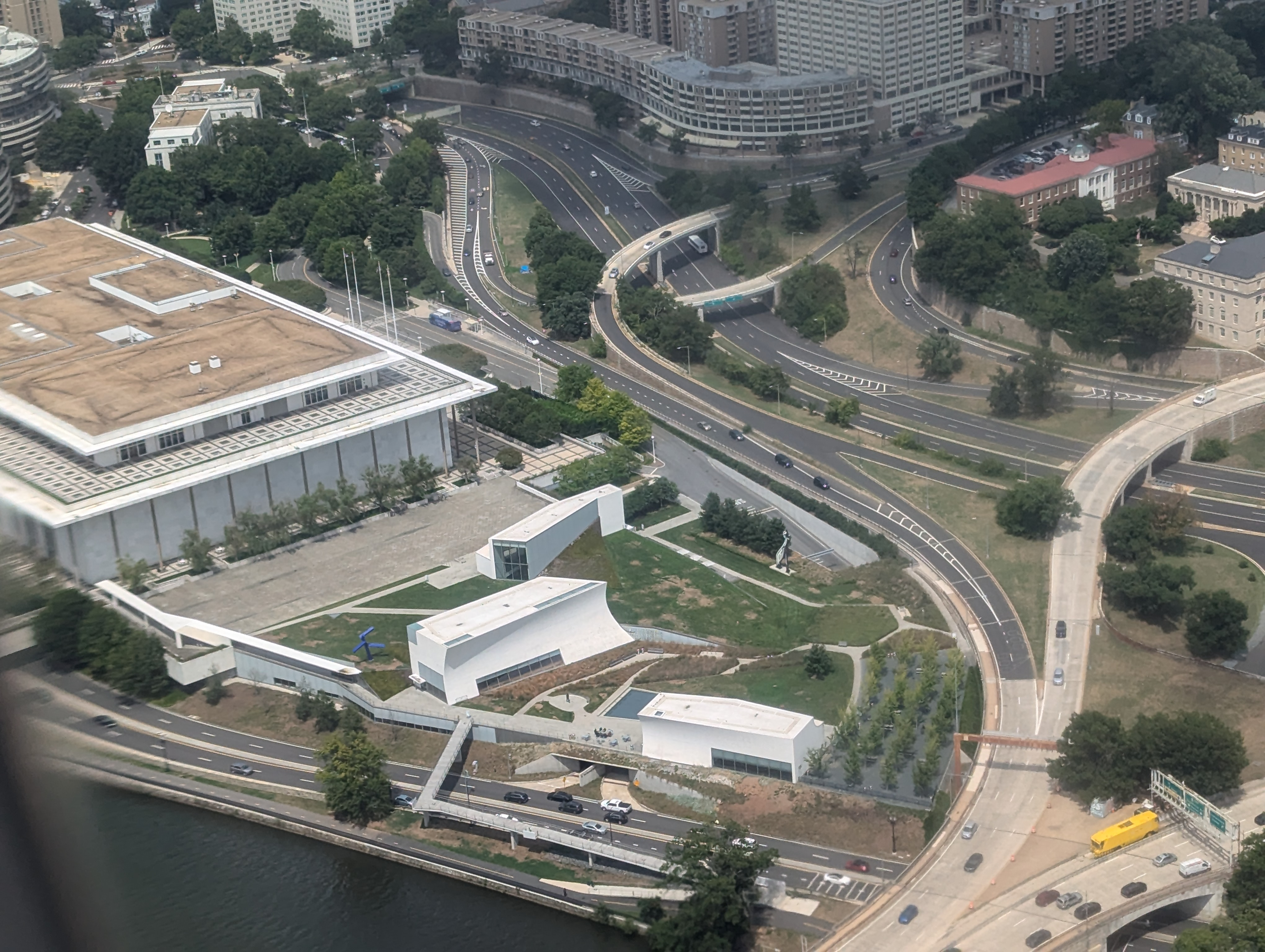
An aerial view of The REACH complex, from July 2024.

Plans for the expansion project began after David M. Rubenstein donated $50 million to the center. A groundbreaking ceremony took place in December 2014. Originally estimated at $100 million, the project cost grew to $175 million, and design changes and a major D.C. sewer project significantly delayed construction. The expansion, entitled the REACH, opened on September 7, 2019, with an opening arts festival. REACH is an acronym: Renew, Experience, Activate, Create, and Honor; named to honor and reflect President Kennedy's aspirational vision for the nation. The fundraising goal for the REACH expansion grew to $250 million as the project progressed, and the target was achieved just two days before opening. The REACH has received several design awards, such as The Architect's Newspaper's Best of the Year Award in the Cultural category and an Honor Award in the 2020 AIA New York Design Awards.

In 2020, Donald Trump named Paolo Zampolli to the center's board of trustees.

=== Second Trump presidency ===
On February 7, 2025, Trump wrote in a post on Truth Social that "We will soon announce a new Board, with an amazing Chairman, DONALD J. TRUMP!", stating that they would immediately terminate board members "who do not share our Vision for a Golden Age in Arts and Culture". On February 10, Trump named Richard Grenell as interim executive director, criticized the center's drag and LGBTQ programming, and vowed to set the performance slate. He dismissed the current board members and appointed his own, (Note: Among those Trump appointed were: Dana Blumberg (wife of billionaire Robert Kraft); Lee Greenwood (country singer); Dan Scavino (White House deputy chief of staff); Usha Vance (second lady of the United States); Susie Wiles (White House chief of staff); Alison Lutnick (wife of commerce secretary-designate Howard Lutnick)) who formally elected him as chair on February 12. Numerous media outlets describe Trump's accession to the chairmanship as effectively self-appointed. The Washington Post stated, "This marks the first time a president has removed his predecessor's board members at the Kennedy Center and installed himself as chair."

The center soon canceled the national tour of the new children's musical Finn (which contains coming-of-age themes); a Kennedy Center spokesperson called it "a purely financial decision". Actors' unions, artists, and members of the public described the move as an attack on free speech and accessibility to the performing arts. Artists began to cancel performances and otherwise disassociate themselves from the Kennedy Center. Among them are Rhiannon Giddens, Issa Rae, Renée Fleming, Shonda Rhimes, and Ben Folds. Producers cancelled entire planned performance runs, including of the musical Hamilton and the play Eureka Day.

In April, guitarist and composer Yasmin Williams emailed Grenell to express her concern about DEI rollbacks and other changes made by Trump. She wrote, "These events have caused a major negative reaction in my musical community to playing at the Kennedy Center, with lots of individuals I know ultimately canceling their shows there". Grenell replied, "Every single person who cancelled a show did so because they couldn't be in the presence of Republicans," and "I cut the DEI bullshit because we can't afford to pay people for fringe and niche programming that the public won't support". When Williams played at the center in September, her performance was disrupted by a group of Log Cabin Republicans whose seats had been reserved by Grenell's office.

In May, the Kennedy Center board revised its bylaws to allow only trustees appointed by Trump to vote, thus excluding the board's 23 ex officio members from voting or constituting a quorum. (Note: The move was later nullified and found to be illegal in a court ruling by US District Judge Christopher R. Cooper; it was determined that ex officio board members are entitled to full voting rights.) Center spokesperson Roma Daravi later said the revision to the bylaws reflected "longstanding precedent" and had passed unanimously with no objections. That same month, Washington Performing Arts announced that it was moving its 2025–26 season events to other venues. Cast members withdrew from a June performance of Les Misérables at the center that Trump planned to attend. In June, Trump and his wife Melania attended the opening night of the Center's performance of Les Misérables and a fundraiser which was later held in the building to support the center.

In July, Republicans on the United States House Appropriations Subcommittee on Interior, Environment, and Related Agencies amended the 2026 Interior, Environment, and Related Agencies spending bill to include a clause that would rename the Kennedy Center Opera House to "Melania Trump Opera House". The amendment requires approval by the entire U.S. House of Representatives. In October, the Washington Post reported that ticket sales at the center had fallen drastically since Trump's takeover, reaching the lowest levels since the COVID-19 pandemic. According to CNN, attendance at the Kennedy Center was incredibly low for many months, prompting staff to "paper the house" by offering free and discounted tickets to fill seats.

In November, a letter from Senator Sheldon Whitehouse said the Kennedy Center had become "a swamp for cronyism and self-dealing" under Grenell, citing contracts awarded to associates, rental-fee discounts for political allies, and luxury spending allegedly unrelated to fundraising. Grenell called the claims "partisan attacks and false accusations," while asserting that he achieved a balanced budget, cut development staff from 94 to 16, and implemented a new policy requiring events to be revenue-neutral. Whitehouse continued an investigation of the Kennedy Center, launched in November by the Senate environment and public works committee.

Trump hosted the 2025 Kennedy Center Honors ceremony on December 7, 2025, the first time a U.S. president has ever hosted the event. The 2025 honorees were all handpicked by Trump: Sylvester Stallone, Gloria Gaynor, George Strait, Michael Crawford, and the rock band Kiss. The New York Times described the event as Trump "putting his cultural takeover of Washington in sharp relief".

==== Board renaming vote and more cancellations ====
The logo used between December 18, 2025, and June 8, 2026.

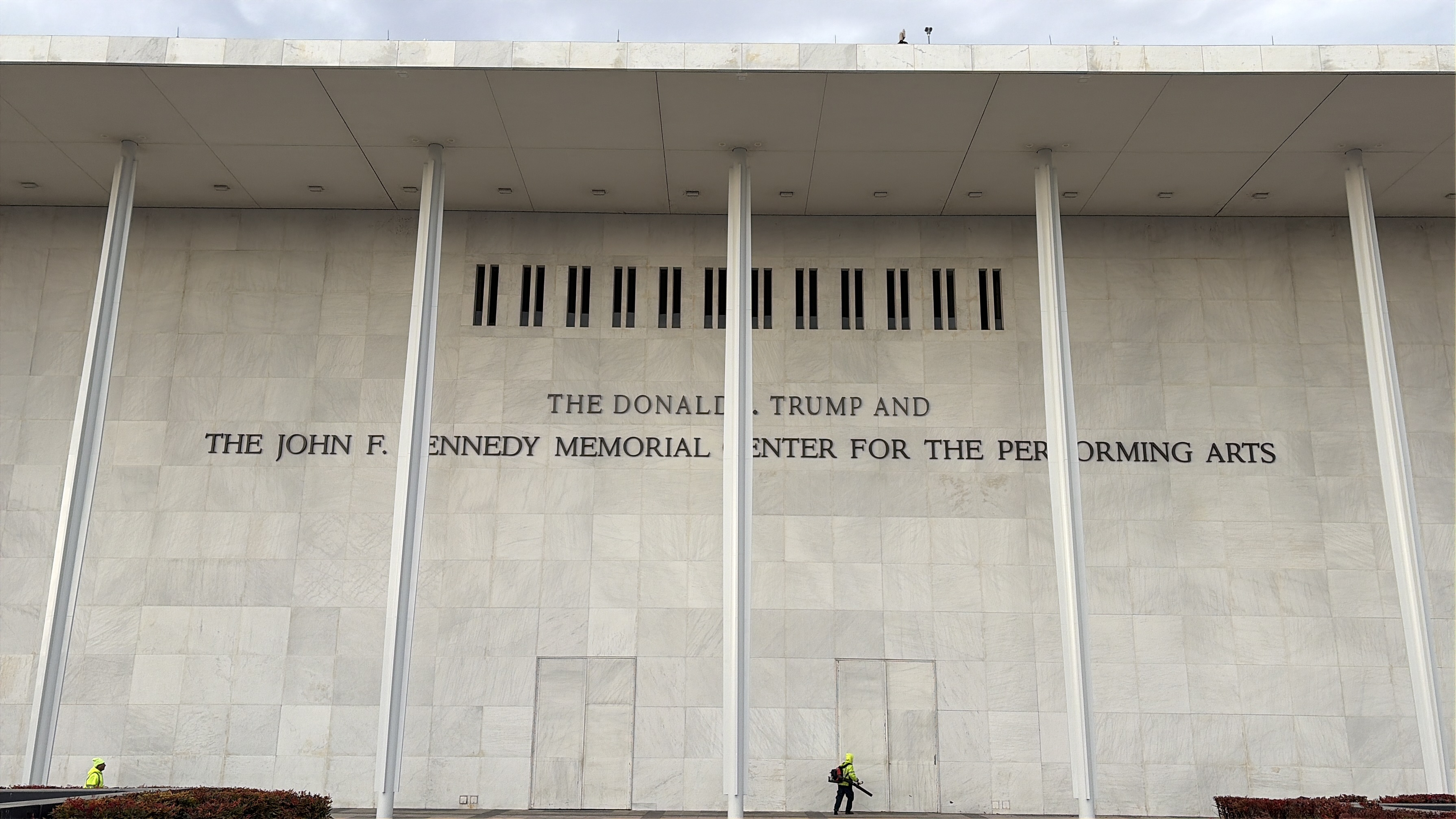
Trump's name was added to the Kennedy Center facade on December 19, 2025. It was removed on June 13, 2026, by order of the U.S. District Court for D.C.

On December 18, 2025, the Kennedy Center board—minus the ex officio members whose votes had been nullified in May—voted to putatively rename the center as The Donald J. Trump and The John F. Kennedy Memorial Center for the Performing Arts, or the Trump-Kennedy Center. Federal statute holds that the center is named the John F. Kennedy Center for the Performing Arts; the board cited no legal authority to rename the center.

White House press secretary Karoline Leavitt said that the vote was unanimous, but ex officio member U.S. representative Joyce Beatty said she "was muted on the call and not allowed to speak or voice [her] opposition to this move". House Minority Leader Hakeem Jeffries and Representative Rick Larsen indicated that they were not present at the meeting; Jeffries further stated, "The Kennedy Center Board has no authority to actually rename the Kennedy Center in the absence of legislative action, and we're going to make that clear." Former congressman Joe Kennedy III, grandnephew of John F. Kennedy, expressed opposition to the name change, stating that the center was "named for President Kennedy by federal law. It can no sooner be renamed than can someone rename the Lincoln Memorial, no matter what anyone says."

The center's website published a new logo on December 18, and workers added Trump's name to the building's facade the following day, violating federal law that prohibits the board from installing another person's name on the building's exterior in the process. According to Justice Department lawyers who represented Trump, the new signage was able to be installed so quickly because it had been "prepared and/or purchased prior to the Board's vote the day before."

On December 23, ex officio member U.S. representative Joyce Beatty filed suit against the Kennedy Center trustees who voted to change the name, arguing that they had no legal power to do so. Beatty later said that her lawsuit was inspired, in part, by a desire to defend President John F. Kennedy's legacy on civil rights.

The illegal name change triggered a new wave of cancellations by artists and companies. In December, the American College Theatre Festival suspended its 58-year partnership with the center. Kristy Lee canceled her January 14 appearance. Musician Chuck Redd, who had been hosting the annual Christmas Eve jazz concert, canceled the event, which had run for two decades at the center. Richard Grenell subsequently sent Redd a letter criticizing his decision as a "political stunt" and saying he would seek $1 million in damages. The breach-of-contract lawsuit, filed in March 2026, was dismissed by the court in June in a motion granted under the district's anti-SLAPP laws, and Judge Tanya Jones Bosier ordered the center to pay Redd's $252,000 in legal fees in August.

On December 29, after several more artists cancelled their events, Grenell stated, "Their actions prove that the previous team was more concerned about booking far left political activists rather than artists willing to perform for everyone regardless of their political beliefs." On January 9, 2026, the Washington National Opera announced it would leave the center; artistic director Francesca Zambello said box office revenue had collapsed and donor confidence had been "shattered" since Trump's takeover. Later that month, composer Philip Glass announced he was withdrawing the scheduled world premiere of his Symphony No. 15, "Lincoln", from the venue.

In a January 16, 2026, press release, venue officials referred to the center as the "Trump Kennedy Center", the "Donald J. Trump and John F. Kennedy Memorial Center for the Performing Arts", the Kennedy Center and the "Center".

Following the name alteration, Toby Morton, a television writer and producer who had anticipated the renaming with an adverse domain name registration, created a satirical political awareness website which parodied the Center's then-current official site.

==== Proposed two-year closure ====
In February 2026, Trump announced that the center would close on July 4, 2026, for a two-year renovation. "I have determined that The Trump Kennedy Center, if temporarily closed for Construction, Revitalization, and Complete Rebuilding, can be, without question, the finest Performing Arts Facility of its kind, anywhere in the World," he wrote on Truth Social. Weeks earlier, he announced plans to restore the building's exterior marble and interior chairs.

CNN reported that the center's new leaders had been unable to sign enough acts for the 2026–27 season, citing anonymous sources with knowledge of the center's programming. The Atlantic's David Graham wrote, "Trump's contradictory statements and the absence of an independent board or any notification to Congress make these claims of a building in need of repair unverifiable at best, and most likely nonsense. A more plausible reason for the closing is that under Trump, the Kennedy Center can't hold on to staff, artists, or audiences", in part because "Grenell's threat to sue Redd for $1 million is unlikely to make artists more eager to book shows."

The surprise announcement disrupted long-planned schedules and forced arts organizations to find new venues. Among them is the National Symphony Orchestra, which typically plays about 175 events a year and had released its 2026–27 schedule more than a year earlier. The following month, the executive director of the orchestra, Jean Davidson, announced that she was leaving, stating, "I didn't see how I could be effective as a leader in the current climate." In August 2026, the orchestra announced a season of 60 concerts at a variety of venues in the Washington area together with a national 5 state tour.

Cultural consultant and former center president Michael Kaiser expressed concern that the two-year closure would destroy the network of supporters for the institution. He has avoided the center since Trump's takeover, stating, "The Kennedy Center had always been a non-partisan institution. We didn't talk politics. We didn't evaluate performers based on their backgrounds or political beliefs and we were there to serve the nation and the region."

On March 13, 2026, Trump announced that Grenell would resign and be replaced by Matt Floca, manager of the center's facilities operations. The Washington Post said Grenell had a "turbulent tenure marked by staff departures, artist cancellations and plummeting ticket sales". Three days later, the center's Trump-appointed board of directors voted to appoint Floca as CEO and executive director. It also ratified the plan to close the center for two years of renovations, to begin following the Fourth of July celebrations.

==== Legal challenges ====
On May 29, 2026, Judge Cooper of the U.S. District Court for the District of Columbia ordered the center to revert to the original name within fourteen days and ordered reconsideration of the venue's extended renovation. The ruling also clarified that ex officio board members are entitled to full voting rights, and prohibits any continued enforcement of an earlier decision by the board to exclude participation of ex officio members. The judge wrote that this "is unlikely to change the Board's current balance of power", and noted that any dispute about ex officio members having voted in the past is irrelevant to the current case. In the same ruling, Cooper issued a temporary order that blocked the proposed two-year closure of the venue. The order may have limited effect as there had been layoffs and more proposed, as well as a 2026-27 calendar not being filled.

Shortly after the ruling, Trump signaled that his administration would adhere to the court order, and stated that he had "no interest" in continuing the overhaul of the Kennedy Center unless he had the power to do whatever he wanted to do, saying the administration would "be working with Congress" to determine next steps. On June 5, Trump said he would remain in charge and stay involved in "the same way" as when he named himself as the chairman.

After the Washington National Opera (WNO) left the Kennedy Center, it asked the center to turn over funds it said the center had gathered on the WNO's behalf―a combination of endowment, other donations, and income. The Kennedy Center did not provide the funds to the WNO, and in June, the WNO sued the Kennedy Center for over $17 million.

==== Branding and financial issues ====
On June 8, 2026, Trump's name was removed from the Kennedy Center's website. Three days later, the Kennedy Center filed notice that it would appeal Cooper's ruling and asked him to stay his order pending appeal. The next day, Cooper denied the request for a stay, at which point the administration applied to the U.S. Court of Appeals for the District of Columbia for an emergency administrative stay, which the appeals court likewise denied. The filing also made public that the board had changed the center's bylaws, such that if Trump's name was removed from the building, millions of dollars in donations would have to be returned. In the same appeal, the Kennedy Center asked for a regular stay pending appeal, which the appeals court denied a month later.

On the night of June 12, scaffolding was erected in front of the lettering of the building facade located on the front portico. Tarps were hung around the scaffolding, blocking the Trump lettering from view; and a crowd gathered and bystanders sang God Bless America, and chanted "take it down". Following the removal of Trump's name from the building, the scaffolding and tarp remained in place, and continue to hide the Kennedy Center sign from the public. In late June, Judge Cooper requested an update from the Kennedy Center about its operations and programming schedule, and demanded an explanation on the purpose and status of the tarp and scaffolding.

On August 13, the board voted to inscribe "Restored and Renovated by President Donald J. Trump" below the institution's name on the building's facade. Later that month, The Washington Post published an analysis based on their own review of confidential internal documents, and concluded that "Ticket sales and fundraising collapsed after President Donald Trump's name was added to the John F. Kennedy Center for the Performing Arts, even as the center's leaders publicly touted a financial turnaround." The obtained records showed that Kennedy Center officials projected a $100 million revenue shortfall for fiscal year 2026, representing missed budget targets and a 70% earned income decline, as well as a $23 million deficit.

==== Removal of artwork from the permanent collection ====
Blue, a sculpture of a sticklike human figure by Joel Shapiro, was dismantled and removed on the morning of September 2, 2026. Crews used a crane, closing the northbound lanes of Rock Creek Parkway under a National Park Service notice. Blue was originally installed in September 2019 at the REACH, overlooking the Potomac River. Shapiro, who gave the work to the center as a permanent installation and who died in 2025, described the mid-kick figure as a "celebration of possibility".

The Kennedy Center gave no advance notice for the removal and did not provide a reason, but said the work was being carried out at their request, and that the Joel Shapiro and Ellen Phelan Foundation would determine where the sculpture was installed next. A statement from the Kennedy Center said they were "deeply grateful to Joel Shapiro for the years Blue has spent animating our campus" and "honored to have been stewards of his vibrant work".

Shortly after removal of the abstract sculpture, Blue was purchased by billionaire philanthropist David Rubenstein, former chairman of the Kennedy Center's board. He purchased the work for $2 million from a foundation dedicated to Joel Shapiro, the artist who had created it. Blue is planned to go on display at the National Gallery of Art Sculpture Garden in Washington, D.C.

Josef Palermo, the center's curator of visual arts and special programming from June 2025 to March 2026, said that Richard Grenell, then the center's president, had directed him to "get rid" of all the outdoor artwork on the campus so that Trump could have an entirely new collection installed when the venue reopened after completion of the planned renovations. Grenell wrote an e-mail to Palermo and others in October 2025, which said: "You can definitely start sending stuff back to the countries who donated it now. Figure out everything you don't want and just send it back ASAP." Grenell suggested that art selected by Trump's patrons should replace pieces that were gifted by foreign nations, including items from the center's collection that were donated in honor of Kennedy.

==== Demolition threats ====
On September 15, 2026, Judge Cooper blocked the board of the Kennedy Center from inscribing the name of President Donald Trump on the performing arts center again. Later the same day, the board voted to immediately close the center for repairs. Trump said that he would cancel the planned renovations and block repairs from being made unless his name was added to the front of the building, a demand that federal courts have already opposed. Trump further stated that the center could "close" and be "ripped down" if his administration did not receive "recognition".

Also on September 15, the Kennedy Center's chief financial officer, Donna Arduin Kauranen, resigned.

On the night of September 16, Trump and Bill Pulte were photographed aboard Air Force One viewing a large poster board titled "Kennedy Center DEMOLISHED" with a construction site depicted below. The photographs of Trump were published shortly after he had commented that the center could be "ripped down".

==== Temporary closure and protests ====
Kennedy Center with barricades and the name covered, September 2026.

On September 17, 2026, executive director Matt Floca said in a court filing that the Kennedy Center would be closed for a period of seven days "unless extended" in order to address public safety issues, citing falling ceiling plaster and potential structural issues, and said this was "separate from any [previous] Board decision related to closure for ongoing renovations." Representative Joyce Beatty, ex officio board member, challenged the closure in court, calling it "unlawful", stating the "Defendants' rationale that they are only temporarily closing the Kennedy Center is a plain pretext to justify shutting down the Center permanently." In response to multiple court filings, Judge Cooper ordered a minimum of 30 days notice from the Kennedy Center prior to any changes in renovation plans "including but not limited to any 'demolition' of the Center's main building."

One day later, on September 18, "about a dozen employees" were laid off, according to sources who spoke with The Washington Post. That evening, thousands of demonstrators, led by workers from the Kennedy Center, showed up to support the performing arts institution. Traffic was blocked when demonstrators marched to the grounds of the Kennedy Center, the crowd chanted "hands off!" as drums were played, with many people wearing costumes and carrying "baby Trump" balloons. Numerous artists were in attendance, and the Gay Men's Chorus of Washington, whose World Pride show in May was canceled after Trump installed himself as chairman, performed at the vigil.

In a status report, filed with the court on September 23, Floca extended the shutdown of the Kennedy Center for an additional week. Floca said he would continue to reevaluate the situation on a weekly basis, thus "raising the prospect of a closure that could stretch on indefinitely", according to The Washington Post.

On September 24, a group of former Kennedy Center employees submitted internal documents to Congress, and stated that Floca had "stopped the remediation process from moving forward" six months ago, despite having the necessary funds available to fix leaks in the roof. The whistleblowers also alleged that $1.4 million in funds, formerly earmarked for waterproofing repairs, was diverted to pay for a column repainting project that cost $4.4 million. That same day, Senator Sheldon Whitehouse sent a letter to Floca, alleging financial mismanagement, cronyism, and corruption, stating "Your failure to respond to my previous requests for financial documents, and the unexplained sudden departure of the CFO [chief financial officer], suggest that something is seriously wrong at the Center." A statement from the Kennedy Center said that, while there "may be differences on priorities, timing, or the best way to deliver necessary improvements", they remain committed to the institution.

== Architecture ==
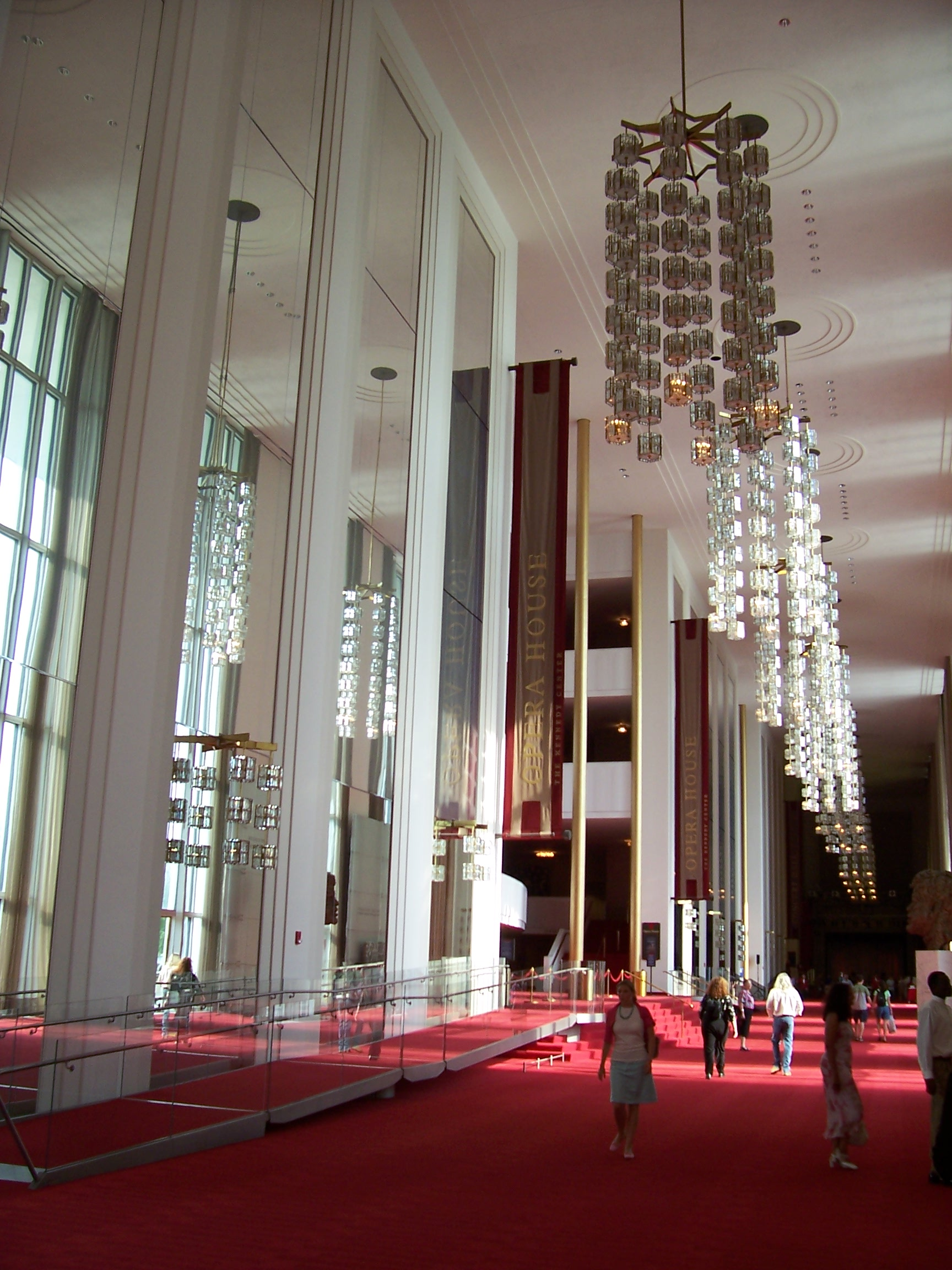
The Grand Foyer, at 63 feet (19 m) high and 630 feet (190 m) long, is one of the largest rooms in the world. If laid on its side, the Washington Monument would fit in this room with 75 feet (23 m) to spare.

The original building, designed by architect Edward Durell Stone, was constructed by Philadelphia contractor John McShain, and is administered as a bureau of the Smithsonian Institution. An earlier design proposal called for a curvier, spaceship-inspired building similar to the neighboring Watergate complex. Overall, the building is 100 feet (30 m) high, 630 feet (190 m) long, and 300 feet (91 m) wide.

The Kennedy Center features a 630-foot-long (190 m), 63-foot-high (19 m) grand foyer, with 16 hand-blown Orrefors crystal chandeliers (a gift from Sweden) and red carpeting. The Hall of States and the Hall of Nations are both 250-foot-long (76 m), 63-foot-high (19 m) corridors. The building has drawn criticism for its location (far away from Washington Metro stops), and for its scale and form. It has also drawn praise for its acoustics, and its terrace overlooking the Potomac River. In her book On Architecture, Ada Louise Huxtable called it "gemütlich Speer".

Cyril M. Harris designed the Kennedy Center's auditoriums and their acoustics. A key consideration is that many aircraft fly along the Potomac River and over the Kennedy Center, as they take off and land at the nearby Ronald Reagan Washington National Airport. Helicopter traffic over the Kennedy Center is also fairly high. To keep out this noise, the Kennedy Center was designed as a box within a box, giving each auditorium an extra outer shell. After the original structure was marked for expansion, a competition in 2013 selected Steven Holl Architects to undertake the design. The extension, called the REACH, opened in 2019.

=== Artwork ===
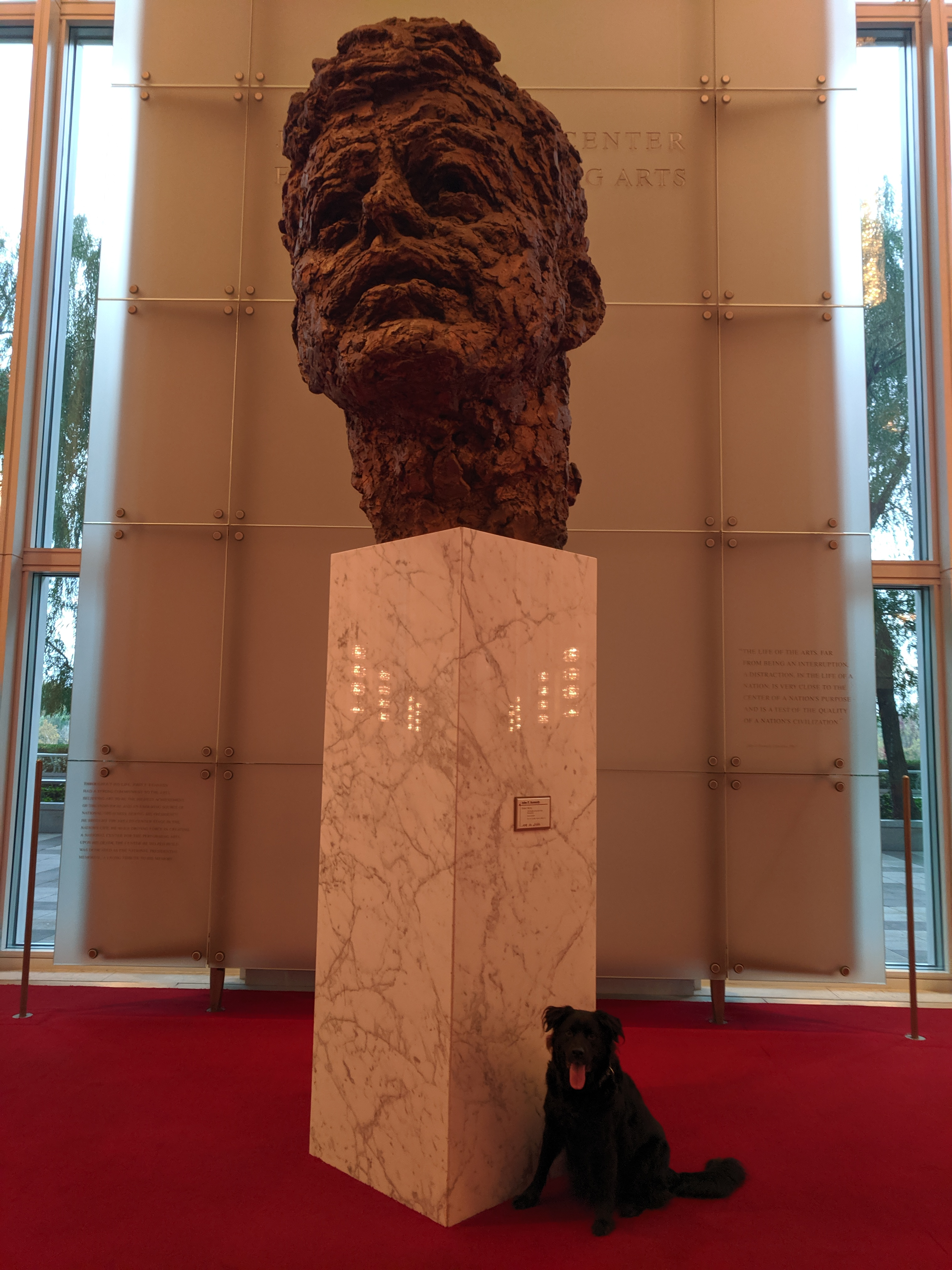
Bust of John F. Kennedy by Robert Berks located opposite the entrance to the Opera House in the Kennedy Center.

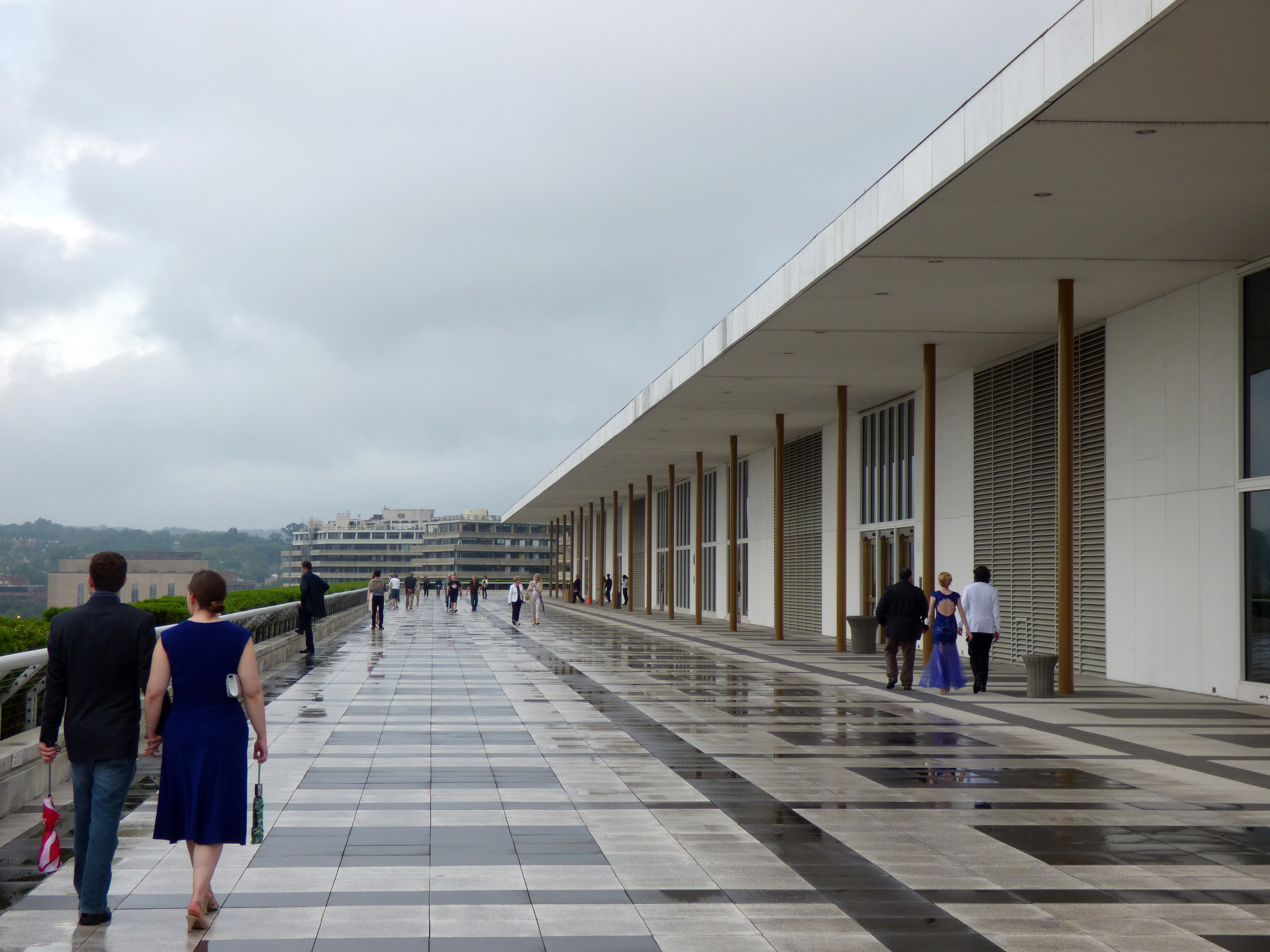
Pedestrians walking on the rooftop terrace that covers the lower walkway

The plaza entrance of the Kennedy Center features two tableaus by German sculptor Jürgen Weber, created between 1965 and 1971 as a gift to the Kennedy Center from the West German government. Near the north end of the plaza is a display of nude figures in scenes representing war and peace, called War or Peace. The piece, 8 ft × 50 ft × 1.5 ft (2.44 m × 15.24 m × 0.46 m), depicts five scenes showing the symbolism of war and peace: a war scene, murder, family, and creativity. At the south end is America, which represents Weber's image of America (8 × 50 × 1.5 ft.). Four scenes are depicted representing threats to liberty, technology, foreign aid and survival, and free speech.

It took the artist four years to sculpt the two reliefs in plaster, creating 200 castings, and another two years for the foundry in Berlin to cast the pieces. In 1994, the Smithsonian Institution's Save Outdoor Sculpture! program surveyed War or Peace and America and described them as being well maintained. Another sculpture, Don Quixote by Aurelio Teno, occupies a site near the northeast corner of the building. King Juan Carlos I and Queen Sofía of Spain gave the sculpture to the United States for its Bicentennial, June 3, 1976.

A sculpture which has been described as the centerpiece and most significant item in the Center’s collection is an 8-foot (2.4 m) high, bronze bust of Kennedy, which is located in the center of the building's Grand Foyer, opposite the entrance to the Opera House. The work, weighing 3,000 pounds and seated on a 10-foot (3.0 m) high marble pedestal, was sculpted by Robert Berks in 1971, and has been located in the Foyer since the Center's opening that year.

== Venues ==
The layout of the three main theaters at the Kennedy Center

The Kennedy Center has three main theaters: the Concert Hall, the Opera House, and the Eisenhower Theater.

=== Concert Hall ===
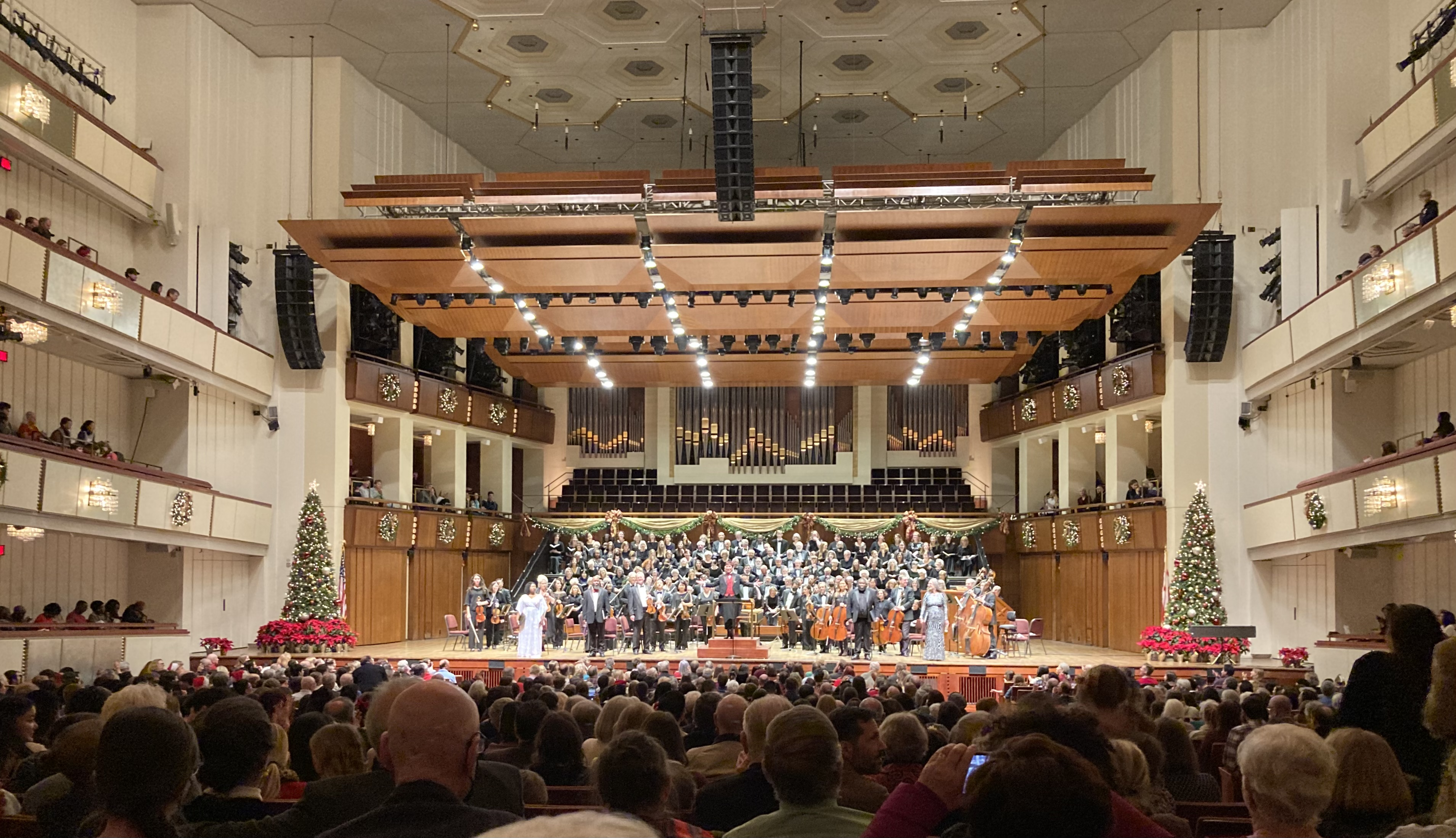
The 51st annual Messiah Sing-Along is held in the Kennedy Center's Concert Hall, December 23, 2023.

The Concert Hall, located at the south end of the center, seats 2,465 including chorister seats and stage boxes, and has a seating arrangement similar to that used in many European halls such as Musikverein in Vienna. The Concert Hall is the largest performance space in the Kennedy Center and is the home of the National Symphony Orchestra. A 1997 renovation brought a high-tech acoustical canopy, handicap-accessible locations on every level, and new seating sections (onstage boxes, chorister seats, and parterre seats). The Hadeland crystal chandeliers, given by the Norwegian government, were repositioned to provide a clearer view. Canadian organbuilder Casavant Frères constructed and installed a new pipe organ in 2012.

=== Opera House ===
The Opera House, in the middle, is the center's major opera, ballet, and large-scale musical venue. It is the home of the annual Kennedy Center Honors and the former home of the Washington National Opera. It has about 2,347 seats; walls covered in red velvet; a distinctive red and gold silk curtain, given by the Japanese government; and a Lobmeyr crystal chandelier with matching pendants, a gift from the government of Austria.

The Opera House closed during the 2003-04 season for renovations that revised the seating and redesigned the entrances at the orchestra level.

=== Eisenhower Theater ===
The Eisenhower Theater, on the north side, seats about 1,161 and is named for President Dwight D. Eisenhower, who signed the National Cultural Center Act into law on September 2, 1958. It primarily hosts plays and musicals, smaller operas, ballet, and contemporary dance. The theater contains an orchestra pit for up to 35 musicians that can be converted into a forestage or seating space. The venue reopened in October 2008 after a 16-month renovation that altered the color scheme and seating.

=== Other performance venues ===
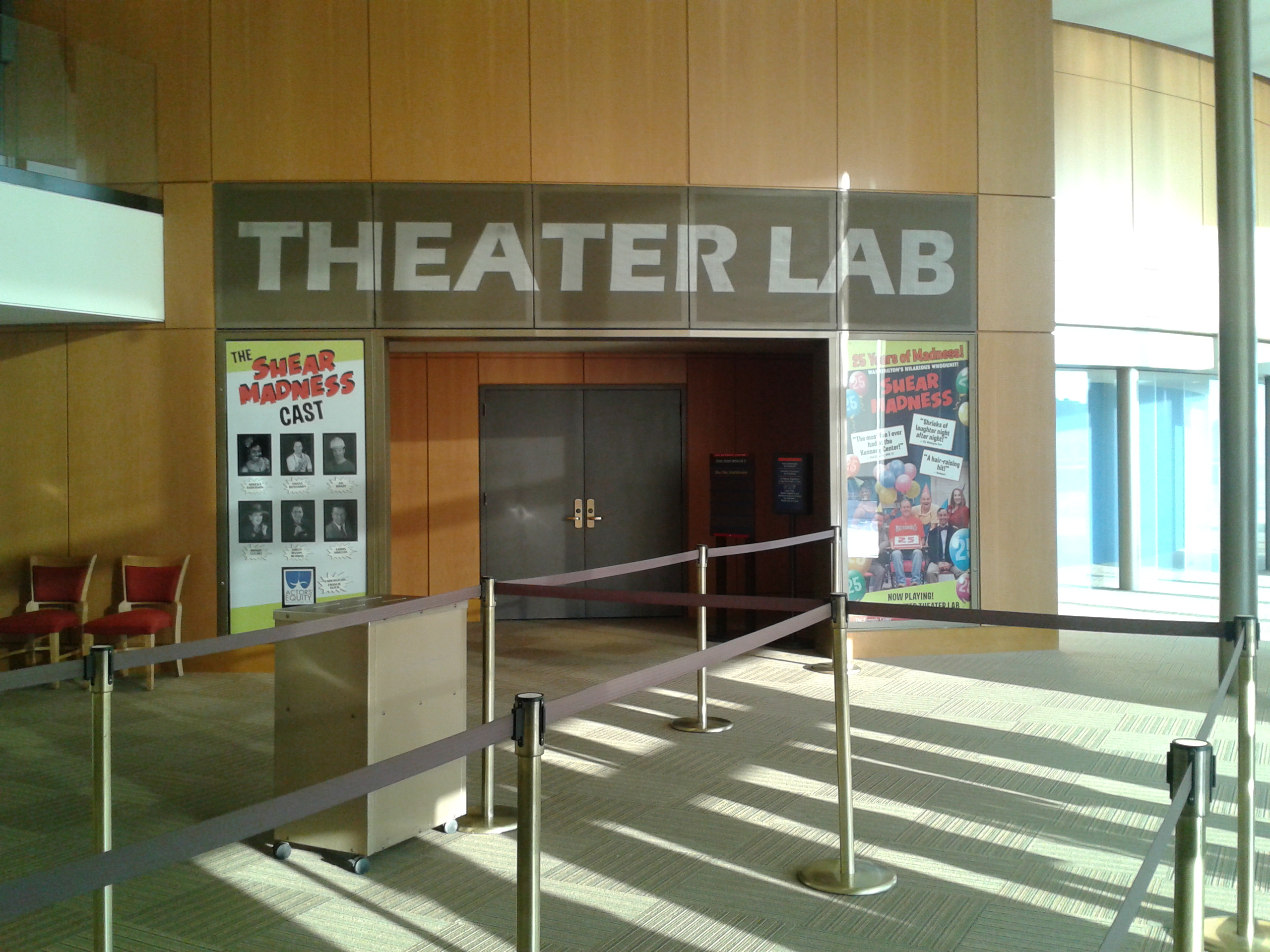
The entrance to the Theater Lab

Other performance venues in the center include:

- Justice Forum is a 144-seat lecture hall at the REACH. Intended for film screenings, presentations, and ensembles, the space has projection screens. Each seat has a table arm for note-taking.
- Millennium Stage, with 235 seats. Part of the concept of "Performing Arts for Everyone" launched by Chairman James Johnson in the winter of 1997, the Millennium Stage provides free performances at 6 pm Wednesday through Saturday on two specially created stages at either end of the Grand Foyer. A Millennium Stage film is shown at 3 pm on Sundays. The Stage features a broad range of art forms, including performing artists and groups from all 50 states. An Artist-in-Residence program pays artists to perform several evenings in a month. Every show on the Millennium Stage is available as a simulcast of the live show at 6 pm, and is archived for later viewing via the Kennedy Center's website.
- River Pavilion is a 268-seat flexible interior space at the REACH. It has a cafe, a wall of windows for natural light, and views of the Potomac River, the reflecting pools, and the Presidential Grove of ginkgo trees.
- Room PT-109 is a meeting space at the REACH with a capacity of 85. The space hosts meetings, dinners and conference breakout sessions. It overlooks the reflecting pool.
- Skylight Pavilion is a 425-person event space at the REACH for events, receptions and dinners under a vaulted ceiling with skylights.
- Studio F is a large multipurpose rehearsal room located at the REACH. It is larger than Studio J with a capacity of 164. Equipped with ballet barres and mirrors this space can be a green room, rehearsal space, breakout room or used for a reception or dinner.
- Studio J is a multipurpose rehearsal room located at the REACH with a capacity of 50. It contains ballet barres mirrors, and is suitable for a green room, meeting space, reception, or dinner.
- Studio K is the largest multipurpose room at the REACH, with a capacity of 350. This space contains a viewing balcony and can be used for a variety of events, performances, theater, or breakout sessions. It is now home to the Kennedy Center Jazz Club.
- The Family Theater, with 320 seats, opened December 9, 2005. It replaced the former American Film Institute Theater located adjacent to the Hall of States. Designed by the architectural firm Richter Cornbrooks Gribble, Inc. of Baltimore, the new theater incorporates a computerized rigging system and a digital video projection system.
- The Terrace Gallery. On March 12, 2003, the space formerly known as the Education Resource Center was officially designated the Terrace Gallery.
- The Terrace Theater, with 490 seats, was constructed on the roof terrace level in the late 1970s as a Bicentennial gift from the people of Japan to the United States. It is used for chamber music, ballet and contemporary dance, and theater. The theater was renovated between 2015 and 2019 to update finishes and systems and make the venue ADA compliant.
- The Theater Lab, with 399 seats, it housed the whodunit Shear Madness, which had played continuously since August 1987, for a total of 14,737 shows. The production ended with a final performance on June 7, 2026, due to Trump's attempted closure of the Kennedy Center.

=== Roof terrace ===
The Kennedy Center roof terrace offers views of landmarks such as the National Cathedral, the Lincoln Memorial, and the Air Force Memorial.

== Programs and productions ==
=== Kennedy Center Honors ===
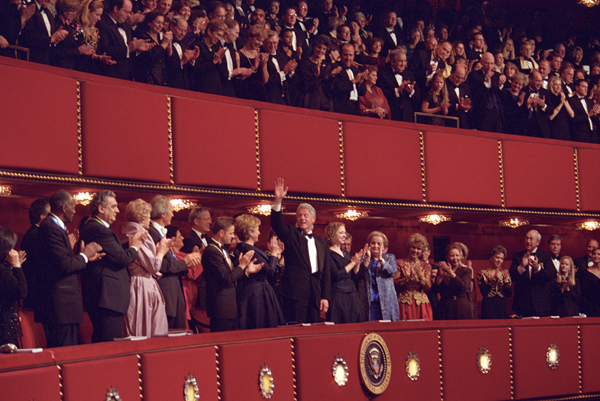
President Bill Clinton and First Lady Hillary Clinton attending the Kennedy Center Honors in December 2000

Since 1978, the Kennedy Center Honors have been awarded annually by the center's board of trustees. Each year, five artists or groups are honored for their lifetime contributions to American culture and the performing arts, including dance, music, theater, opera, film, and television. In 2025, the event was hosted by Donald Trump, a first for a sitting or former U.S. president. Trump said he was "about 98 percent involved" in selecting the honorees.

=== Mark Twain Prize for American Humor ===
The Kennedy Center has awarded the Mark Twain Prize for American Humor annually since 1998. Named after the 19th-century humorist Mark Twain, it is presented to individuals who have "had an impact on American society in ways similar to" Twain.

=== Artists-in-residence and artistic advisors ===
The Kennedy Center hosts residencies for artists to work with the center's performing ensembles, programmers, and community initiatives. The Education Artist-in-Residence program was established in 2019. Mo Willems, author and illustrator of the Pigeon series of children's books, was the inaugural holder of the position, serving a two-year residency beginning in July 2019. Author Jacqueline Woodson succeeded Willems in the role beginning in January 2022. During her tenure, several of her books were adapted as stage productions at the center, among them The Other Side and The Day You Begin.

The Composer-in-Residence is a multi-year appointment in which a composer creates and presents new works in collaboration with the center's resident ensembles. Carlos Simon was appointed to the role beginning in the 2021–2022 season, composing works for the National Symphony Orchestra and Washington National Opera, writing the theme music for the Kennedy Center Honors, and producing a total of 19 works programmed at the center, of which nine were commissions. His residency was extended beyond its initial three-year term.

Culture artist-in-residence positions have been held by hip-hop group the Roots and pianist Robert Glasper, both of whom served extended residencies at the center's REACH campus.

In 2016, the center appointed three artistic advisors as part of a broader initiative tied to the centennial of President Kennedy's birth. Cellist Yo-Yo Ma and soprano Renée Fleming were each appointed artistic advisor at large. Fleming and Ma both resigned in February 2025 following President Trump's takeover of the center.

Singer-songwriter Ben Folds was appointed the first artistic advisor to the National Symphony Orchestra in 2017, curating collaborations between popular artists and the orchestra. He resigned in February 2025.

Violinist Jennifer Koh was appointed artistic director of the Fortas Chamber Music Concerts in December 2022, succeeding Joseph Kalichstein, who had led the series since 1997. The Fortas series, founded in the 1980s, presents chamber music concerts at the center each season.

Pianist Billy Taylor served as the center's first artistic director for Jazz from 1994 until his death in December 2010. Pianist and composer Jason Moran was appointed his successor in 2011 and resigned in June 2025.

=== Dance ===
Dance has been a component of Kennedy Center programming since the center opened in 1971. The center presents ballet and contemporary dance across its stages, with the Opera House serving as the primary venue for visiting companies. The center sponsors two annual dance residency programs for young people: Exploring Ballet with Suzanne Farrell and the Dance Theatre of Harlem Residency Program, both now in their second decade. The center is known for its annual production of the ballet The Nutcracker, which has been performed by various companies. The Kansas City Ballet performed The Nutcracker at the Kennedy Center in November 2022.

=== Education ===
The Kennedy Center American College Theatre Festival (KCACTF) is a national theater program dedicated to improving collegiate theater in the United States. It was founded in the 1960s by Roger L. Stevens, the Kennedy Center's founding chairman, and grew to involve more than 18,000 students annually from over 600 colleges and universities in all 50 states. The national festival was held annually at the Kennedy Center in Washington, D.C. for 58 years. In December 2025, following President Trump's takeover of the center and the board's vote to rename it, the KCACTF announced it was suspending its 58-year partnership with the Kennedy Center, stating that decisions made by the center's new leadership "do not align with our organization's values."

The Kennedy Center's Changing Education Through the Arts creates professional development opportunities for teachers and school administrators. Each year, over 700 teachers participate in approximately 60 courses focused on integrating the arts into their teaching. The program partners with sixteen schools in the Washington, D.C. Metro area to develop a long-range plan for arts integration at their school.

Exploring Ballet with Suzanne Farrell was a three-week summer ballet intensive for international pre-professional ballerinas ages 14–18 since 1993.

Turnaround Arts is a national education program of the Kennedy Center targeting elementary and middle schools in low-income communities. It was founded in 2011 by the President's Committee on the Arts and the Humanities under the leadership of First Lady Michelle Obama, beginning with eight pilot schools. In May 2016, Obama announced that management of the program would transfer to the Kennedy Center.

VSA is an international organization on arts, education, and disability, founded in 1974 by Jean Kennedy Smith as an affiliate of the Kennedy Center. Originally named the National Committee – Arts for the Handicapped, it was renamed Very Special Arts in 1985 and VSA in 2010. In 2011, VSA merged with the Kennedy Center's Office on Accessibility to become the Department of VSA and Accessibility at the center.

=== Festivals ===
The Kennedy Center has presented large-scale international festivals celebrating the arts and culture of specific regions or nations. Early international initiatives included African Odyssey (1997–2000), a four-year program dedicated to the arts and artists of Africa, and AmericArtes (2001–2004), a multi-year Latin American festival. The center's Festival of China was, at the time of its presentation, the largest celebration of Chinese arts and culture in American history.

Subsequent festivals have included JAPAN! culture + hyperculture (February 2008); ARABESQUE: Arts of the Arab World (February–March 2009); Maximum India (February–March 2011); and Nordic Cool 2013 (February–March 2013).

In 2023, the Kennedy Center announced a decade-long commitment to environment-themed programming, including biennial international festivals aligned with United Nations environmental goals for 2030. The inaugural festival, RiverRun: arts nature impact, ran from World Water Day (March 22) to Earth Day (April 22, 2023). The second installment, REACH to FOREST, took place in February 2024, followed by Earth to Space in 2025.

=== Hip hop and contemporary music ===
The Kennedy Center began incorporating hip hop into its programming incrementally, with early appearances by artists including Mos Def in 2008 as part of jazz programming. In 2014, the center presented One Mic: Hip Hop Culture Worldwide, a festival that included Nas performing his debut album Illmatic in its entirety with the National Symphony Orchestra, marking the album's 20th anniversary. The performance was later broadcast on PBS's Great Performances and is available on Netflix. In 2015, Kendrick Lamar performed his album To Pimp a Butterfly with the NSO Pops.

In 2016, the Kennedy Center appointed rapper, producer, and DJ Q-Tip as its first artistic director of hip-hop culture. Simone Eccleston was subsequently appointed the first director of hip-hop culture and contemporary music. In 2017, LL Cool J became the first hip hop artist to receive a Kennedy Center Honors. In 2018, the center announced the formation of the Hip Hop Culture Council, an advisory body chaired by Q-Tip whose founding members include Questlove, Black Thought, Common, LL Cool J, Robert Glasper, MC Lyte, Fab 5 Freddy, Grandmaster Caz, 9th Wonder, Pharoahe Monch, and others.

=== Jazz ===
In 1994, the Kennedy Center appointed Billy Taylor as the artistic advisor for jazz, and his first installation was his own radio show, Billy Taylor's Jazz at the Kennedy Center.

Since 2003, the center's jazz programs have been regularly broadcast on NPR's JazzSet with Dee Dee Bridgewater. In March 2007, the center hosted a celebration, Jazz in Our Time, which bestowed its Living Jazz Legend Award on more than 30 artists. In 2015, Lady Gaga and Tony Bennett performed there as part of their Cheek to Cheek Tour.

Pianist and composer Jason Moran was appointed Taylor's successor in November 2011. Under Moran, the center continued the Mary Lou Williams Women in Jazz Festival and Betty Carter's Jazz Ahead, and added the annual NEA Jazz Masters Tribute Concert, in which the National Endowment for the Arts awards its Jazz Masters fellowships.

=== Millennium Stage ===
The Millennium Stage is a free performance series held every evening every day of the year. Created as part of the center's "Performing Arts for Everyone" initiative, the series presents artists from across all genres. Performances are also livestreamed online. The Millennium Stage was established in the 1990s under Kennedy Center president Lawrence Wilker.

=== National Symphony Orchestra (NSO) ===
The National Symphony Orchestra (NSO) is an American symphony orchestra founded in 1931 by cellist Hans Kindler, originally based at Constitution Hall. It has been housed at the Kennedy Center since the venue opened in 1971 and became a formal artistic affiliate in 1986. The NSO has performed the annual televised PBS broadcasts A Capitol Fourth and the National Memorial Day Concert.

=== NSO Pops ===
The National Symphony Orchestra Pops (NSO Pops) is a programming strand of the National Symphony Orchestra presenting popular music, film scores, Broadway, and crossover programming in the Kennedy Center Concert Hall. Steven Reineke has served as Principal Pops Conductor since 2011, leading the orchestra in collaborations with artists spanning hip hop, R&B, rock, pop, and Broadway. Artists who have performed with the NSO Pops include Kendrick Lamar, Nas, Maxwell, Common, Ne-Yo, Cynthia Erivo, Sutton Foster, and Ben Folds, among many others.

Annual NSO Pops programming includes a Holiday Pops concert series each December and summer Pops programming on the Concert Hall stage. The series has also presented film scores performed live to picture, including scores by composers such as Michael Giacchino. Reineke has been featured in nationally broadcast PBS appearances with the NSO, including leading the orchestra in the Nas Illmatic concert and the Ben Folds DECLASSIFIED special on Next at the Kennedy Center.

=== Social impact ===
The Kennedy Center established a formal Social Impact program under the leadership of Marc Bamuthi Joseph, who served as Vice President and Artistic Director of Social Impact. The center outlined an eight-channel framework for social impact activity woven throughout the institution, with major support from the Ford Foundation.

In March 2025, following President Trump's takeover of the Kennedy Center, the center dismantled the Social Impact program, laying off seven of the team's employees. Bamuthi Joseph was also let go.

=== Theater ===
The center has co-produced more than 300 new works of theater, including Tony-winning shows ranging from Annie in 1977 to A Few Good Men, How to Succeed in Business Without Really Trying, The King and I, Titanic, and the American premiere of Les Misérables. The center also produced the Sondheim Celebration (six Stephen Sondheim musicals) in 2002, Tennessee Williams Explored (three of Tennessee Williams' classic plays) in 2004, Mame starring Christine Baranski in 2006.

In 2007, the center produced Carnival!, August Wilson's Pittsburgh Cycle (Wilson's complete ten-play cycle performed as fully staged readings) and Broadway: Three Generations both in 2008, and a new production of Ragtime in 2009. The Kennedy Center Fund for New American Plays has provided critical support in the development of 135 new theatrical works. In 2011, a new production of Follies starring Bernadette Peters opened at the Eisenhower Theater, and transferred to Broadway that fall.

==== Broadway Center Stage ====
From 2017 to 2025, the Kennedy Center produced a musical series dubbed Broadway Center Stage. The productions, which featured the Kennedy Center Opera House Orchestra on stage, were mounted at the Eisenhower Theater as limited engagements of one to two weeks. The series produced two Broadway transfers and one Off-Broadway transfer.

==== Fund for New American Plays ====
In 1988, the Kennedy Center and American Express established the Fund for New American Plays, a grant program supporting regional theaters in developing new American work. The fund distributed grants of up to $25,000 to theaters presenting new plays, with the aim of reducing financial risk and encouraging the production of new American writing. Among the plays supported by the fund were The Heidi Chronicles, Angels in America, The Kentucky Cycle, and David Henry Hwang's Golden Child.

==== Sondheim Celebration ====
The Sondheim Celebration was a festival of six fully staged productions of musicals by composer-lyricist Stephen Sondheim, presented by the Kennedy Center in the summer of 2002. Running from May 10 through August 25, the festival was the first time the Kennedy Center had devoted a concentrated season to the work of a single artist, and at $10 million was the most expensive theater project in the center's history at that time.

Eric Schaeffer served as artistic director of the festival, directing two of the six productions himself. The six shows were staged in two rotating repertories of three in the Eisenhower Theater. The first repertory comprised Sweeney Todd, Company, and Sunday in the Park with George; the second comprised Merrily We Roll Along, Passion, and A Little Night Music. In conjunction with the six productions, the Kennedy Center presented the American premiere of the New National Theatre of Tokyo's production of Pacific Overtures, performed in Japanese with English surtitles, which ran in September 2002.

===== Sondheim Celebration productions =====
| Title | Director | Principal cast |
|---|---|---|
| A Little Night Music | Mark Brokaw | Blair Brown, John Dossett, Randy Graff, Danny Gurwin, Natascia Diaz, Douglas Sills, Sarah Uriarte Berry, Kristen Bell, Barbara Bryne |
| Company | Sean Mathias | John Barrowman, Lynn Redgrave, Alice Ripley, Emily Skinner, Keira Naughton, Matt Bogart, Kim Director, Marcy Harriell |
| Merrily We Roll Along | Christopher Ashley | Raúl Esparza, Michael Hayden, Miriam Shor, Emily Skinner, Anastasia Barzee |
| Passion | Eric Schaeffer | Judy Kuhn, Michael Cerveris, Rebecca Luker |
| Sunday in the Park with George | Eric Schaeffer | Raúl Esparza, Melissa Errico, Cris Groenendaal, Florence Lacey, Donna Migliaccio |
| Sweeney Todd | Christopher Ashley | Brian Stokes Mitchell, Christine Baranski, Hugh Panaro, Celia Keenan-Bolger, Mary Beth Peil, Walter Charles |

=== Washington National Opera ===
The Washington National Opera (WNO) was a resident company of the Kennedy Center from 1971 until 2026. It was founded in 1956 as the Opera Society of Washington by music critic Day Thorpe of the Washington Star, with Paul Callaway, organist and choirmaster of Washington Cathedral, as its first music director. The company gave its first performances in January 1957. It was renamed The Washington Opera in 1977 and designated by Congress as the national opera company in 2000, when it became the Washington National Opera.

Following the 2008 financial crisis, WNO faced near-bankruptcy. In 2011, it signed an affiliation agreement with the Kennedy Center that transferred its assets, liabilities, and employees to the center while the company retained its own corporate charter, board of trustees, and fundraising operations. Francesca Zambello was appointed artistic director in 2012, and a second affiliation agreement was signed in 2024.

After President Trump's takeover of the Kennedy Center in February 2025, ticket sales collapsed and donor confidence fell sharply. On January 9, 2026, WNO announced it was ending its 15-year affiliation with the center and relocating its performances to other Washington venues.

=== Art and Ideals: President John F. Kennedy ===
Opened in September 2022, Art and Ideals: President John F. Kennedy is a permanent exhibit dedicated to President John F. Kennedy's relationship with art. The exhibit has four sections, each explaining the role art played in culture, democracy, social change, and the White House during Kennedy's presidency. The exhibit was designed by architectural firm KieranTimberlake, curator Ileen Gallagher, and a committee of five U.S. historians.

=== Other events ===
The Kennedy Center regularly hosts special Inauguration Day events and galas during the start of each presidential term. During the United States Bicentennial, the Kennedy Center hosted numerous special events throughout 1976, including six commissioned plays. The center hosted free performances by groups from each state. In December 1976, Mikhail Baryshnikov's version of The Nutcracker played for two weeks.

In 1977, the Opera House hosted George Bernard Shaw's Caesar and Cleopatra with Rex Harrison and Elizabeth Ashley. The American Ballet Theatre has also frequently performed at the Kennedy Center. The troupe's 2004 production of Swan Lake, choreographed by Kevin McKenzie, was taped there, shown on PBS in June 2005, and released on DVD shortly after. Productions of The Lion King and Trevor Nunn's production of My Fair Lady (choreographed by Matthew Bourne) were presented in the 2007–2008 season.

The Kennedy Center at 50, a concert to celebrate the center's 50th anniversary, was held on September 14, 2021, and aired on PBS on October 1, 2021. Audra McDonald hosted, and first lady Jill Biden gave opening remarks. The Kennedy Center hosted the draw for the 2026 FIFA World Cup on December 5, 2025.

=== Local performing arts organizations ===
Many local arts organizations have presented their work at the Kennedy Center. Some of these include:

- American Film Institute
- The Washington Chorus
- The Cathedral Choral Society of Washington
- Choral Arts Society of Washington
- Opera Lafayette
- VSA arts
- The Washington Ballet
- Washington Concert Opera
- Washington National Opera
- Washington Performing Arts Society
- Woolly Mammoth Theatre Company
- Young Concert Artists of Washington

== VSA organization ==
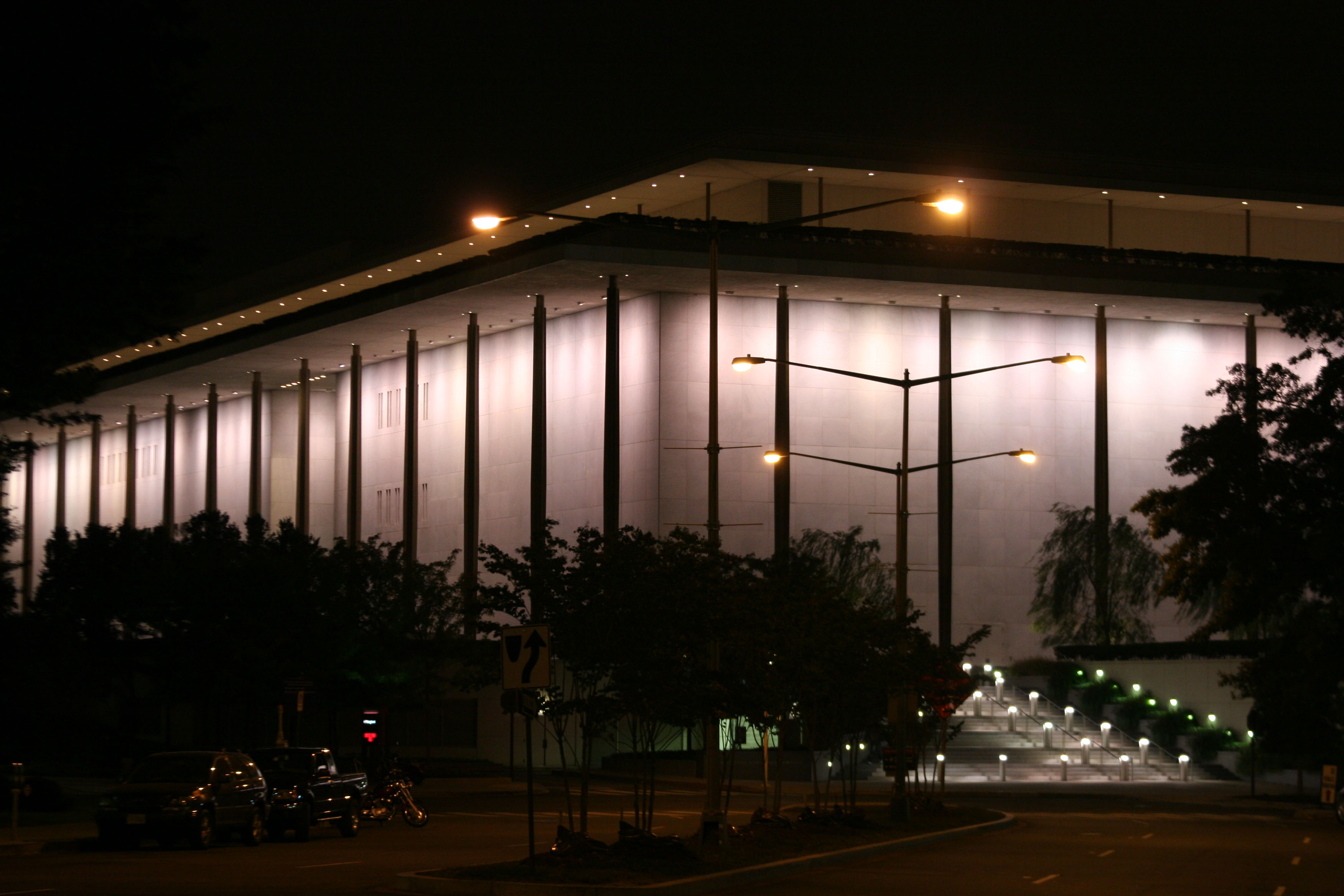
The Kennedy Center at night

VSA (formerly VSA arts) is an international nonprofit organization founded in 1974 by Jean Kennedy Smith to create a society where people with disabilities learn through, participate in, and enjoy the arts. VSA provides educators, parents, and artists with resources and the tools to support arts programming in schools and communities. VSA showcases the accomplishments of artists with disabilities and promotes increased access to the arts for people with disabilities.

Each year 7 million people participate in VSA programs through a nationwide network of affiliates and in 54 countries around the world. Affiliated with the Kennedy Center since 2005, VSA was officially merged into the organization in 2011 to become part of the center's Department of VSA and Accessibility.

== Management ==
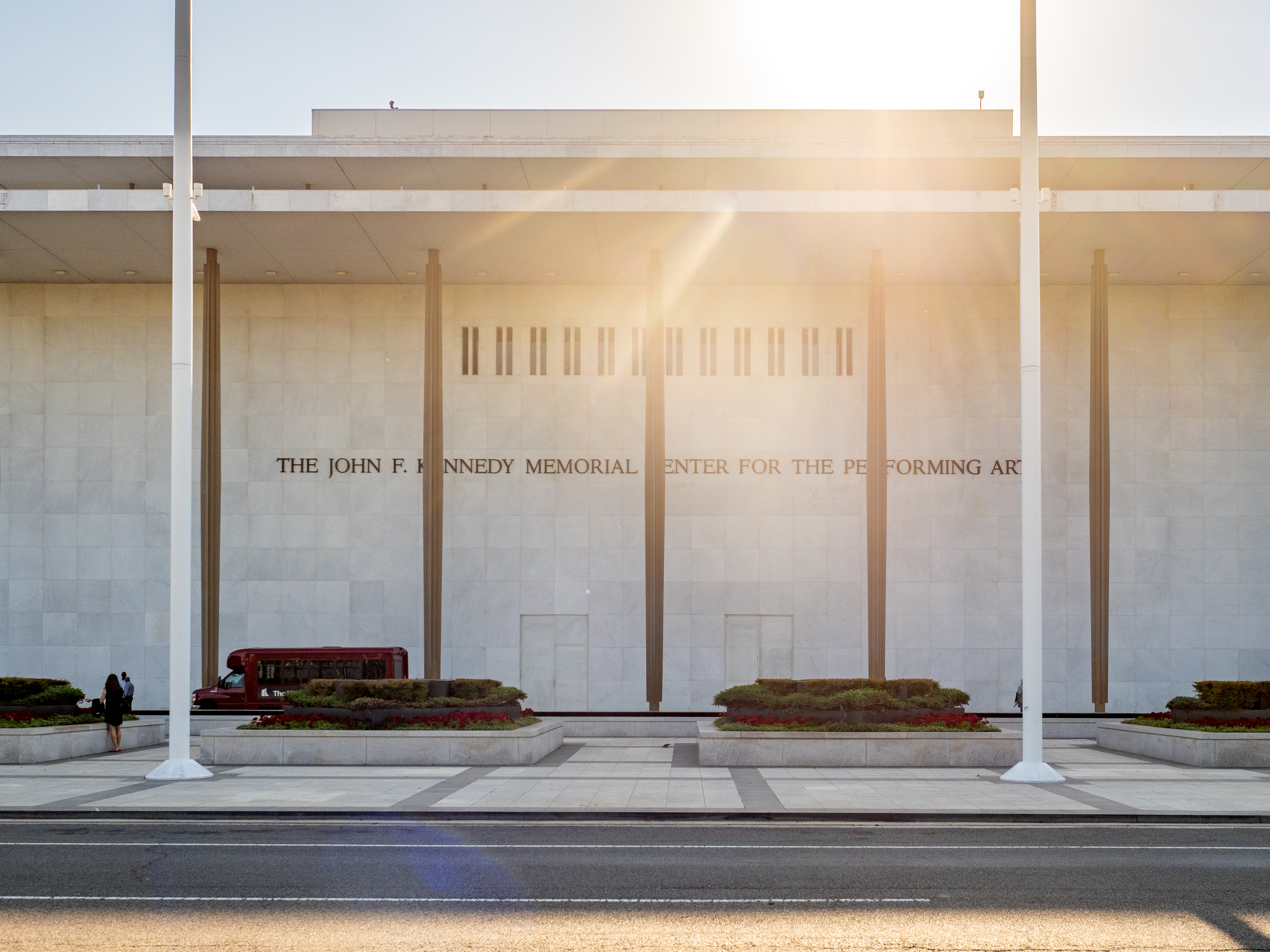
The entrance

Until 1980, the daily operations of the Kennedy Center were overseen by the chairman of the board of trustees and by the board itself. Aspects of the center's programming and operations were overseen by various other people. George London was the center's first executive director (often called "artistic director" by the press, although that was not the formal title), serving from 1968 to 1970, while William McCormick Blair, Jr. was its first administrative director.

Julius Rudel became music director in 1971. In 1972, Martin Feinstein replaced London and held the position of artistic director until 1980. Marta Casals Istomin was named the first female artistic director in 1980, a position she held until 1990; she was also the first person to formally have that title.

In 1991, the board created the position of chief operating officer to remove the responsibility for overseeing the day-to-day operations of the Kennedy Center from the chairman and board. Lawrence Wilker was hired to fill the position, which later was retitled president. The artistic director continued to oversee artistic programming, under the president's direction.

Michael Kaiser became president of the center in 2001. He left the organization when his contract expired in September 2014. In September 2014, Deborah Rutter became its third president; she was the first woman to hold that post. Rutter had previously been president of the Chicago Symphony Orchestra Association, a position she held from 2003. In 2015, Rutter appointed arts executive Robert Van Leer to assist with leadership and expansions. In February 2025, Rutter was dismissed as president shortly after U.S. president Donald Trump became chairman of the organization.

=== Funding and finances ===
Authorized by the National Cultural Center Act of 1958, which requires that its programming be sustained through private funds, the center represents a public–private partnership. Its activities have included educational and outreach initiatives almost entirely funded through ticket sales and gifts from individuals, corporations, and private foundations. The center receives annual federal funding to cover building maintenance and operations.

=== Board of trustees ===
The center's board, formally known as the Trustees of the John F. Kennedy Center for the Performing Arts, maintains and administers the center and its site. The honorary chairs of the board are the First Lady and her living predecessors. Members of the board are specified by U.S. Code Title 20 Chapter 3 subchapter V §76h.

They include ex officio members such as the secretary of health and human services, the librarian of Congress, the secretary of state (substituting for the director of the United States Information Agency after that agency was abolished), the chairman of the Commission of Fine Arts, the mayor of the District of Columbia, the superintendent of schools of the District of Columbia, the director of the National Park Service, the secretary of education and the secretary of the Smithsonian Institution, and several members of Congress, and 36 general trustees appointed by the president of the United States for six-year terms.

== See also ==
- Architecture of Washington, D.C.
- List of memorials to John F. Kennedy
- List of theaters in Washington, D.C.
