= Jarold A. Kieffer =

Jarold A. Kieffer (May 5, 1923 – March 22, 2017) was the first executive director of the National Cultural Center, later renamed the John F. Kennedy Center for the Performing Arts, in Washington, D.C.

== Early life ==
He was born in Minneapolis, Minnesota on May 5, 1923. He served in the U.S. Army from 1942 to 1946, stationed in the South Pacific and the Philippine Islands. He received his Ph.D. from the University of Minnesota in 1950.

== Career ==
He served in a variety of positions in the Eisenhower administration, including with the Office of Defense Administration, the Committee on Government Organization, the Borrowing Authority Review Board, the President’s Advisory Committee on Government Organization, and the second Hoover Commission. From 1957–1958 he served as assistant to Nelson D. Rockefeller and then as assistant to the Secretary of Health, Education, and Welfare from 1958–1959. In January 1961, Kieffer became the first Executive Director of the National Cultural Center (now known as the John F. Kennedy Center for the Performing Arts). He oversaw numerous fund raising efforts and assisted in creating the architectural plan for the Center.

From 1970 to 1975, Kieffer worked in the Department of State and the Department of Transportation. In 1978 he became the Director of the National Committee on Careers for Older Americans. In 1976, he helped found the Advanced Transit Authority (ATRA) where he served as secretary, treasurer, and later chairman of the Board of Directors. He authored the book From National Cultural Center to John F. Kennedy Center for the Performing Arts: At the Front End of the Beginning which was published in 2004.

== Death ==
Kieffer died at his home in Fairfax, Virginia on March 22, 2017 at the age of 93.
