= Ileen Sheppard Gallagher =

Museum Curator

Ileen Gallagher is an exhibition producer, curator, and project manager. She is known for her creation of the Rolling Stones Exhibitionism exhibit and the Jean-Michel Basquiat: King Pleasure exhibit, which opened in 2022.

She first worked as a curator for the De Young Museum in San Francisco, the Queens Museum of Art in New York City, the Library of Congress in Washington DC, and the John and Mable Ringling Museum of Art in Sarasota. She then originated the exhibitions in the Rock and Roll Hall of Fame in Cleveland, Ohio and was featured on Conan O'Brien at the museum. In 1999, she started her own company, ISG Productions, creating exhibitions for The Walt Disney Museum in San Francisco and Harley-Davidson Headquarters in Milwaukee. She taught for 12 years in the graduate museum studies program at New York University. In 2022, she created an exhibit for the Clive Davis Institute of Recorded Music at NYU.
