= Vladimir Alekseyev (general) =

Russian lieutenant general

- Владимир Алексеев
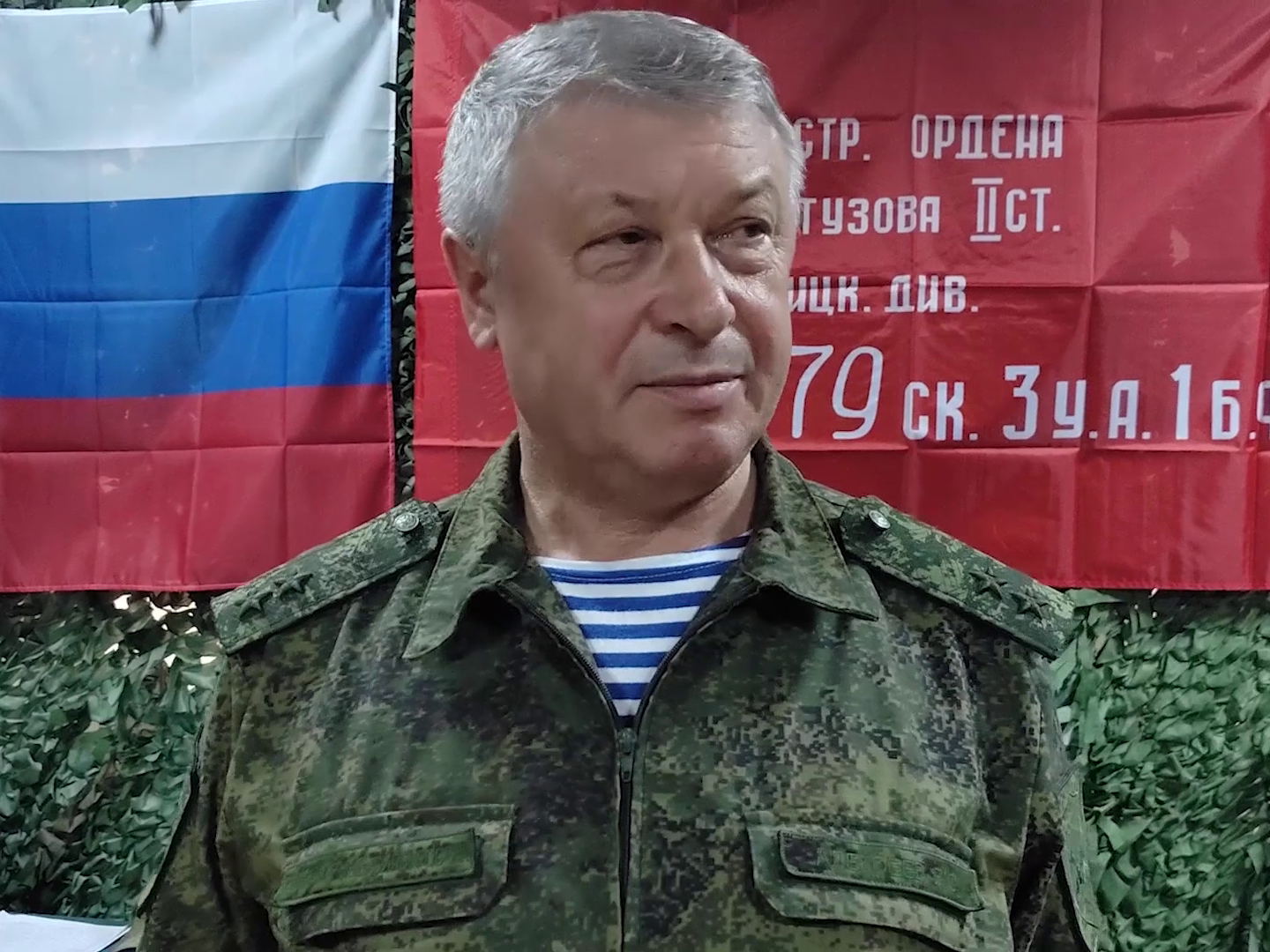
- Vladimir Alekseyev in 2023
- Born: 24 April 1961 (age 65); Holodky, Vinnytsia Oblast, Ukrainian SSR, Soviet Union
- Education: Ryazan Guards Higher Airborne Command School
- Spouse: Galina Alekseyeva
- Children: 2
- Military career
- Allegiance: Russia
- Branch: GRU
- Service years: 1980–present
- Rank: Lieutenant general
- Conflicts: Syrian Civil War; Russo-Ukrainian war; Wagner Group rebellion
- Awards: Hero of the Russian Federation

Vladimir Stepanovich Alekseyev (Russian: Владимир Степанович Алексеев; born 24 April 1961) is a Russian lieutenant general who has served as first deputy head of the Main Directorate of the General Staff of the Russian Armed Forces (GRU) since 2011. He was awarded the title Hero of the Russian Federation for his involvement in the Russian military intervention in the Syrian civil war. Alekseyev is known to have intelligence connections to paramilitary groups around the world. The European Union and UK placed Alekseyev under sanctions after they accused the GRU of being behind the 2018 nerve agent attack in Salisbury in the UK. He was also allegedly involved in interfering in the 2020 United States presidential election.

Alekseyev was shot and seriously wounded in Moscow on 6 February 2026.

== Biography ==
Vladimir Stepanovich Alekseyev was born on 24 April 1961, in the village of Holodky, Khmilnyk Raion, Vinnytsia Oblast, in the Ukrainian Soviet Socialist Republic. He was the son of a disabled father and a nurse mother. Villagers later recalled that Alekseyev showed an interest in a military career from a young age. After completing secondary school, he was unsuccessful in gaining admission to a military school, and was subsequently conscripted into the military. Alekseyev was then admitted to the Ryazan Higher Airborne Command School, graduating in 1984. He moved to Russia and married a Russian woman, Galina, with whom he had two children.

Alekseyev served in Spetsnaz special forces units, rising to chief of the intelligence directorate of the Moscow Military District headquarters, and then in the same position in the Far Eastern Military District. Later he was transferred to the central staff of the Main Intelligence Directorate (GRU), where he headed the 14th department, responsible for the Spetsnaz. Alekseyev was appointed chief of staff and first deputy head of the Main (Intelligence) Directorate of the General Staff of the Russian Armed Forces in 2011, and was promoted to lieutenant general. The last time Alekseyev visited his birthplace was in September 2014, after the War in Donbas had begun, for the funeral of his mother. Alekseyev was sanctioned by the United States for organizing "malicious cyberattacks" during the Russian interference in the 2016 United States elections. During the Russian intervention in the Syrian civil war, he supervised military intelligence officers. For his "courage and heroism, shown in the execution of military duty," Alekseyev was awarded the title Hero of the Russian Federation by a secret decree in 2017. Alekseyev was sanctioned by the European Union in January 2019 for orchestrating the 2018 poisoning of Sergei and Yulia Skripal in the United Kingdom, then a member of the EU.

In 2019 Vladimir Alekseyev, as deputy head of the GRU, led the team in Ukraine that interfered in the 2020 United States Presidential Elections through Rudy Giuliani and the Biden–Ukraine conspiracy theory. According to charges filed by Ukraine, Alekseyev paid the team of Oleksandr Dubinsky, Andrii Derkach, and Kostiantyn Kulyk ten million US dollars for subversive activities.

In May 2022, he was identified as the top military intelligence commander responsible for Ukraine by Tsargrad TV, after the start of the Russo-Ukrainian war, signaling a switch of responsibility for targeting Ukraine in intelligence operations away from the 5th Service of the FSB. Alekseyev was among the Russian representatives in the negotiations for the July 2022 Black Sea Grain Initiative, and at the time Bellingcat investigator Christo Grozev identified him as supervising Russian private military companies. He was sanctioned by Canada on 19 August 2022 for being complicit in the Russian regime's aggression against Ukraine.

According to Kommersant Alekseyev is believed to have been a founder of Wagner as well as other private military companies. When the Wagner Group rebellion began on 23 June 2023, Alekseyev appeared in a video in which he condemned the actions of the Wagner Group as a coup, a "stab in the back of the country and president. Only the president has the authority to appoint senior military leadership, and you are trying to encroach on his power." Hours later, Alekseyev and deputy minister of defense Yunus-bek Yevkurov negotiated with Wagner Group leader Yevgeny Prigozhin in Rostov-on-Don. In response to Prigozhin's demand to hand over Chief of the General Staff Valery Gerasimov and Defence Minister Sergei Shoigu, he told him, "You can have them".

== Attempted assassination ==
Around 07:00 MSK, on 6 February 2026, Alekseyev was shot multiple times in a residential building near the Volokolamsk Highway (part of the Moscow Ring Road) in Moscow. He was immediately transported to a hospital, where reports indicated that his condition was critical. According to Oleg Tsaryov, Alekseyev remained in a coma following surgery. The next day TASS reported that Alekseyev had regained consciousness.

Kommersant reported that two men were under suspicion for the attack. Oleg Tsaryov wrote on Telegram that two men had been detained in Dubai and were on their way to Moscow, according to The Insider, and Novaya Gazeta reported the same information on Telegram channels Mash and Shot. On 8 February 2026, it was reported that a suspect had been detained in the United Arab Emirates in connection with the attempted assassination, and extradited to Russia.

=== Reactions ===
The Federal Security Service accused the Security Service of Ukraine (SBU) of being behind the assassination attempt. Russian authorities also blamed Ukraine for the attack, claiming that the Ukrainian government sought to disrupt the negotiation process between Russia, Ukraine, and the United States aimed at ending Russia's war against Ukraine. The latest round of these talks had concluded the day before the attack. The Russian delegation at the negotiations was led by GRU chief Igor Kostyukov, whose subordinate Alekseev is. SBU had previously carried out attacks on high-ranking Russian military officials during Russia's invasion of Ukraine. According to The Washington Post, this time Western intelligence agencies doubt Ukraine's involvement.

The Ukrainian government denied involvement, with foreign Minister Andrii Sybiha saying that it may have been caused by "internal Russian infighting".

== Decorations ==
Alekseyev is a recipient of the following decorations:

- Hero of the Russian Federation
- Order of St. George, 4th class (2022)
- Order "For Merit to the Fatherland", 4th class with swords
- Order of Alexander Nevsky
- Order of Suvorov
- Order of Courage (2)

== See also ==
- List of Heroes of the Russian Federation
