= Yehor Cherniev =

Ukrainian politician

- Єгор Чернєв
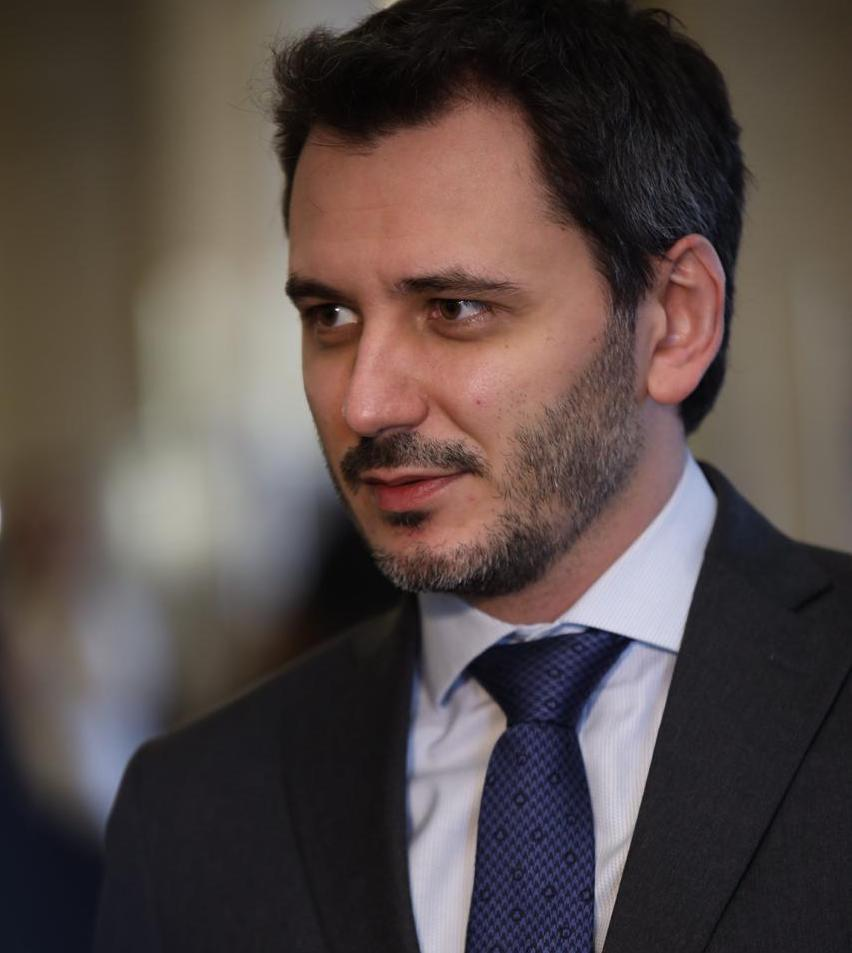

People's Deputy of Ukraine
- Incumbent
- Assumed office 29 August 2019
- Constituency: Servant of the People, No. 26

Personal details
- Born: 5 February 1985 (age 41) Berdiansk, Ukrainian SSR, Soviet Union (now Ukraine)
- Party: Servant of the People
- Other political affiliations: Independent
- Education: Kyiv National University of Culture and Arts; Kyiv National Economic University; King's College London

Yehor Volodymyrovych Cherniev (Ukrainian: Єгор Володимирович Чернєв; born 5 February 1985) is a Ukrainian politician currently serving as a People's Deputy of Ukraine from the Servant of the People party in the Verkhovna Rada, number 26 on the party's list. He is the Deputy Chairman of the Committee on National Security, Defence and Intelligence of the Verkhovna Rada of Ukraine, and the Chairman of the Permanent Delegation of Ukraine at the NATO Parliamentary Assembly.

== Early life and career ==
Yehor Volodymyrovych Cherniev was born on 5 February 1985 in Berdiansk, then part of the Soviet Union.

In 2007, he graduated from the Kyiv National University of Culture and Arts with a degree in public relations management. The next year, he graduated from Kyiv National Economic University with a degree in business economics. He has also graduated from King's College London with a master's degree in science in public policy and management.

Following the beginning of the Russo-Ukrainian War in 2014, he joined the National Guard of Ukraine.

== Political career ==
Cherniev was elected as a People's Deputy of Ukraine in the 2019 Ukrainian parliamentary election as number 26 on Servant of the People's party list, and was an independent at the time of election.

From August 2019 to October 2022, he served as Deputy Chairman of the Digital Transformation Committee of the Verkhovna Rada of Ukraine.

He is currently Deputy Chairman of the Committee on National Security, Defence and Intelligence of the Verkhovna Rada of Ukraine, Chairman of the Permanent Delegation of Ukraine at the NATO Parliamentary Assembly.

In 2020, during the debate surrounding the so-called "anti-Kolomoyskyi law" (Bill 2571-d), he alleged that many MPs were receiving text messages from a Russian-linked phone number intending to influence their vote and not to oppose Kolomoiskyi. Later that year, he publicly called for the removal of Vitold Fokin from the Trilateral Contact Group on Ukraine due to his support for general amnesty for all militants, special statuus for Donetsk and Luhansk, and implying equivalence between Ukrainian and Russia forces. In January 2021, he was also the first MP from the Servant of the People to openly support removing Oleksandr Dubinsky from the faction. He reasoned that Ukraine could not ignore the U.S. sanctions against Dubinsky for alleged ties to Andrii Derkach, and that relations with the U.S. outweighed internal factional politics.
