= Sergey Petrushin =

Russian entrepreneur

Sergey (Georgy) Petrushin is a Russian entrepreneur. He is the founder and co-owner of the marketing agency Zeppelin PRO, founder of the nightclub Zeppelin, producer of the blues band CrossRoadz, producer of the Europe's largest electronic music festival, co-owner of an art gallery Zeppelin, and collector of photo art. He was a business partner of Michael R. Caputo who, in March 2021, told Mother Jones that Petrushin was his "business partner and friend for 25 years" and that Petrushin lives in Miami. Producer of Sleeping Beauty Dreams

== Career ==
Petrushin founded the «Zeppelin» brand in 1997. Nightclub «Zeppelin» opened in December 1999 as one of the first venues for performances of pop and rock artists including Emir Kusturica, The Tiger Lillies, Vacuum, Tonino Karotone, Joan Aguzarovoj and Mummy Troll. The first club shows of Leningrad and Glukoza were organized at "Zeppelin". Performances of world-known electronic dance music (EDM) (such as Fatboy Slim and Paul Oakenfold, Basement Jaxx, Darren Emerson, Sonique, Benny Benassi and Seb Fontaine were held in "Zeppelin".

At the same time he started to work in producing and advertising and marketing. The best in Europe (according to the «DJ Mag») EDM festival «FortDance» was organized at the club. Cooperation with brands GateCrasher and GodsKitchen was very successful.

The nightclub closed in 2004. Zeppelin PRO agency focused on the organization of music festivals, concerts, events, advertising, promotions, BTL and PR campaigns. Petrushin founded and produced projects including "Red Summer MTS" with participation of Shakira and Black Eyed Peas. He took part in the organization of a U2 concert in Moscow, «Alfa 4D-show at the Moscow State University" and the festival of electronic music Alfa Future People.

In April 2012 George and his wife Julia opened «Zeppelin» art gallery, a modern art space that presented the exhibitions of leading Russian photographers (Anton Lange, Vladimir Claviho, Michael Korolev, Serge Golovach and many others).

In 2015 George and his family moved to Miami, Florida.

In the year 2016, he started developing Sleeping Beauty Dreams. This global contemporary dance with the biggest stars took 2 years to develop and was premiered December 2018 in Miami and New York. The show then had successful tours in 2019 all over the United States and Russia.

== Projects ==
- Zeppelin (Moscow)
- The Most (*Kichkok (Moscow)
- Hospital (Chabarovsk)
- Z Top (N. Novgorod)
- Zolotoy (Yalta)
- Sleeping Beauty Dreams

== Awards and recognition ==
- Opening of the Year - Night Life Awards- 2000
- Best nightclub show - Night Life Awards- 2002
- Best Promoter - Night Life Awards - 2001, 2004
- Best Dance Project of the Year - Night Life Awards - 2001., 2003., 2004. (for annual dance-festival – "FortDance») and 2005 (for Not Zeppelin Halloween "From dusk till dawn");
- Club of the year - «TheMost» - Night Life Awards 2007
- Best company in event marketing and Best marketing campaign by opinion of professional media - Silver Mercury Award 2010
- Most innovative concept - Silver Mercury Award 2010
- Music event of the year - Event of the Year 2014

== Meetings during the 2016 Trump Campaign ==
In May 2016 a couple of weeks after George Papadopoulos had a 10 May 2016 meeting with Alexander Downer, Petrushin facilitated a meeting between Caputo, who was candidate Trump's public relations officer during the 2016 presidential campaign, and the Russian Henry Greenberg. (Note: Gennady Vasilyevich Vostretsov (Russian: Геннадий Васильевич Вострецов; born 1 June 1959 Kuybyshev (Samara), Kuybyshev Oblast (Samara Oblast), Soviet Union) is also known as Henry Greenberg or Henry Grinberg or Gennady Vostretsov or Gennady Arzhanik or Henry Oknyansky. Vostretsov was married to Russian actress Yelena Arzhanik until their divorce in 2002. Following Vostretsov's large transfer of money from Russia to the Netherlands in 1992 which occurred after a deal was reached between his company the Moscow-based Finintorg and C Trade in which Finintorg would supply canned meat to C Trade, he relocated to Los Angeles with his then wife Arzhanik and became Gennady Arzhanik. Following the divorce, Gennady Arzhanik was deported from the United States and moved to Moscow in December 2002, assumed the name Henry Oknyansky and lived with John Daly but was arrested over allegedly misappropriating funds related to the deal between Finintorg and C Trade. A "Henry Greenberg" or "Henry Grinberg" (Russian: Генри Гринберг) is listed as an economic news correspondent with Davidzon Radio which is the largest Russian-language radio station in the United States and is owned by the Russian-American Gregory Davidzon, a kingmaker of the Russian-majority community of Brighton Beach, New York. On 3 July 2018, Vladimir Kozlovsky (Russian: Владимир Козловский) of Novaya Gazeta published a dossier on Henry Greenberg.) Greenberg had met Petrushin through a possible restaurant deal in Sunny Isles, Florida. Later, Petrushin facilitated a meeting between Roger Stone and Greenberg during which Greenberg alleged to have political dirt on Hillary Clinton. Two weeks after this meeting the Trump Tower meeting occurred. Andrew McCabe explained that in July 2016 the FBI began an investigation into Russia's attempts to interfere with the 2016 United States elections.

== Documentary: The Ukraine Hoax: Impeachment, Biden Cash, and Mass Murder with guest host Michael Caputo ==
Petrushin co-produced the film The Ukraine Hoax: Impeachment, Biden Cash, and Mass Murder with guest host Michael Caputo. Andrii Derkach, who is a Russian intelligence agent that graduated from the FSB Academy, Konstantin Kilimnik, who is a member of the Russian intelligence community and an associate of Paul Manafort who described Kilimnik as Manafort's "Russian Brain", and Andrii Telizhenko, who is a close associate of Rudy Giuliani, supported Petrushin and Michael Caputo making the documentary which aired on the One America News Network (OANN) on 21 January 2020 only two weeks before the Senate's acquittal of Donald Trump after his first impeachment trial. In March 2021, Christopher Wray, who was the Director of the FBI during most of Donald Trump's presidency, and the National Intelligence Council stated that numerous Russians, other individuals, proxies and entitites, including Manafort, Giuliani, Fox News, the One America News Network, the documentary film The Ukraine Hoax: Impeachment, Biden Cash, and Mass Murder with guest host Michael Caputo, which was supported by Petrushin, Kilimnik, Derkach, Telizhenko, and others, supported anti Biden, anti Ukraine, pro Trump, pro Russia, pro Kremlin, and pro Putin disinformation efforts during the Trump presidency including Trump's two impeachment trials and his two presidential campaigns.
