= Political interference with science agencies by the first Trump administration =

Political interference with science agencies of the Trump administration

During his first term as president of the United States (2017–2021), Donald Trump and his administration repeatedly politicized science by pressuring or overriding health and science agencies to change their reporting and recommendations so as to conform to his policies and public comments. This was particularly true with regard to the COVID-19 pandemic, but also included suppressing research on climate change and weakening or eliminating environmental regulations.

Trump and his appointees pressured federal health and science agencies to take particular actions that Trump favored and to support his public pronouncements. He sometimes claimed that there was a "deep state" conspiracy among federal scientists, whose members delayed approval of COVID-19 vaccines and treatments because they wanted to hurt him politically or prevent his re-election.

== Background ==
Trump, inaugurated as president on January 20, 2017, did not name a Science Advisor to the President until July 2018, when he appointed meteorologist Kelvin Droegemeier to the position. Science advisory committees at multiple agencies including the Department of the Interior, the National Oceanic and Atmospheric Administration, and the Food and Drug Administration were disbanded. Many of Trump's first cabinet picks were people with a history of opposition to the agency they were named to head, including Rick Perry as Secretary of Energy and Betsy DeVos as Secretary of Education. In the science area the head of the Environmental Protection Agency (EPA), Scott Pruitt, had repeatedly sued the EPA when he was Oklahoma attorney general, and described himself as a "leading advocate against the EPA’s activist agenda".

== Survey ==
In a survey of scientists at 16 federal agencies conducted in 2018, 50% of respondents agreed that "the level of consideration of political interests hindered the ability of their agencies to make science-based decisions"; 69% of scientists at the U.S. Fish and Wildlife Service, 76% of respondents at the National Park Service, and 81% of scientists at the Environmental Protection Agency agreed.

== Health agencies ==
=== Suppressing and altering communications from health agencies ===
On February 25, 2020, in the earliest days of the COVID-19 pandemic in the United States, a senior official with the Centers for Disease Control (CDC) said publicly that the spread of the virus in the U.S. was inevitable. This contradicted Trump's more optimistic predictions, and the CDC was largely banned from giving briefings on the coronavirus for the next six months.

In April 2020 political strategist and lobbyist Michael Caputo was appointed by the White House as assistant secretary for public affairs of the Department of Health and Human Services (HHS), in control of the department's communications strategy. Caputo appointed Paul Alexander, a Ph.D. health researcher, as his top advisor. They and other HHS officials attempted to control the content of information coming from the CDC whenever it was deemed to contradict or undermine what Trump was saying publicly.

In May 2020, according to documents released in April 2022 by the United States House Select Oversight Subcommittee on the Coronavirus Crisis, the Trump administration overruled the CDC's proposed guidelines for religious organizations. The CDC had warned that houses of worship were hot spots for coronavirus spread, but the White House removed from the guidelines all recommendations that churches consider online or drive-in services. Trump personally urged states to allow all houses of worship to reopen immediately and threatened to "override" any governors who did not do so.

In June 2020, the White House installed two political operatives with no public-health background at the CDC's Atlanta headquarters. Their responsibilities, according to CDC and administration officials, were to monitor CDC scientists and CDC Director Robert Redfield, as part of the ongoing effort to control the organization's public messaging. At first their role at CDC was undefined; one was later named Redfield's acting chief of staff and the other as her deputy. Although officially reporting to Redfield, they communicated regularly with Caputo and Alexander at HHS.

Caputo in June was trying to gain control of the Morbidity and Mortality Weekly Report (MMWR), a weekly publication issued by the CDC; it is the CDC's main vehicle for imparting current information and recommendations about public health to physicians, researchers, and the general public. In September 2020, it was reported that political appointees at HHS had tried repeatedly to change, delay, or remove reports about COVID-19 from MMWR if they undermined Trump's claims that the outbreak was under control. Caputo confirmed the September report, saying that his attempts to influence the content of MMWR had been going on for 3 1/2 months. He said it was because the MMWR reporting contained "political content" as well as scientific information, adding that the changes suggested by his office were "infrequently" accepted by CDC. A MMWR report downplaying the benefit of hydroxychloroquine as a COVID-19 treatment was delayed for almost a month as Alexander questioned the political leanings of the authors. A report on the susceptibility of schoolchildren to the virus was also held up. Alexander demanded, unsuccessfully, that he be allowed to review and edit all issues of MMWR before they were published. On August 8, Alexander wrote to Redfield saying that "CDC to me appears to be writing hit pieces on the administration". He asked Redfield to change some reports that had already been published. Alexander later said that the CDC had written "pseudoscientific reports" and that he was in a better position to "make the judgment whether this is crap". CDC resisted many of the changes, but increasingly allowed HHS personnel to review articles and suggest changes before publication.

In August 2020, Emily J. Miller, a right-wing activist who had previously worked for the pro-Trump channel One America News Network and had no previous science or medical experience, was appointed as Assistant Commissioner for Media Affairs for the FDA, including being their top spokesperson, a role usually performed by non-political civil servants. Two weeks later, she was abruptly dismissed from the position, reportedly due to repeated clashes with the Agency's staff and a lack of aptitude for communicating in the medical and scientific field. Miller was subsequently appointed as the senior advisor to the chief of staff at the FDA. She described Regeneron's antibody cocktail, which was provided to Trump after he tested positive for COVID-19, as being "like a cure" for the disease.

In August and early September 2020, Alexander sent several messages to press officers at the NIH attempting to direct Anthony Fauci's media comments. Among his demands were that Fauci should refrain from promoting the wearing of masks by children in school and COVID-19 testing of children. Fauci later said that he had not received the messages and would not have been influenced by them if he had.

On September 16, CDC director Redfield told a Senate hearing that HHS and the White House Office of Management and Budget had ordered him to transfer $300 million from his agency's budget to HHS, to be spent on a public relations campaign directed by Caputo. He added that CDC had not been consulted about the proposed public relations campaign, which was intended to "bring America back". Caputo stated on Facebook that the program "was demanded of me by the president of the United States, personally." The goal was to get at least 20 celebrities to record messages to "restore hope" and "defeat despair" that would be broadcast before the November election. However, weeks before the election the program was reported to be "sputtering," because most of the targeted celebrities refused to participate and because the video firm hired to carry out the project, headed by a business partner of Caputo, had no prior experience with public health campaigns. On October 2, HHS Secretary Alex Azar told Congress that he had begun a review of the program to ensure that it would serve a public health purpose. On October 29, Politico reported that the program was no longer slated to run before the election and might not run at all. It was also reported that celebrities suggested for the announcements were vetted for their political opinions before being approached; if they had ever criticized Trump or expressed support for President Barack Obama, gay rights, or same-sex marriage they were ruled out. Reportedly 274 celebrities were considered but only 10 were approved.

In emails to Redfield, Alexander and Caputo repeatedly accused CDC scientists of attempting to "hurt the president" and writing "hit pieces on the administration". CDC employees described the period as a five-month-long campaign of bullying and intimidation. On June 30 Alexander strongly criticized an interview by Anne Schuchat, principal deputy director of the CDC, in which she described the extent of the pandemic and urged Americans to wear masks. Alexander accused her of lying and attempting to embarrass the president, and may have tried to get her fired. In another incident, Caputo repeatedly demanded to know who in the CDC press office had approved a series of interviews between a CDC epidemiologist and NPR, saying that he needed to manage department communications and "If you disobey my directions, you will be held accountable". He similarly threatened a CDC press official who had told CNN about an upcoming vaccine public relations campaign. On June 20, 2020, Alexander sent a message to CDC Director Redfield, criticizing a CDC report about risks to pregnant women from COVID-19. Alexander said that the report, whose limitations the CDC had acknowledged, would "frighten women" and give the impression that "the President and his administration can't fix this and it is getting worse". He said that in his "opinion and sense" the CDC was "undermining the president by what they put out".

On September 16, after the political influence over the CDC was reported, Caputo took a 60-day medical leave of absence and Alexander was fired. In an interview with the Toronto-based Globe and Mail after his departure from HHS, Alexander defended his actions, stating that he had wanted the CDC to make their reports "more upbeat so that people would feel more confident going out and spending money", and that he "did not think agencies should contradict any president's policy".

In September, Democrats on the House Oversight and Reform Select Committee on the Coronavirus Crisis launched an investigation into political interference with the CDC's reports and recommendations regarding the coronavirus. Charlotte Kent, the editor of MMWR, told the panel in December that she had been ordered to destroy an August 8 email from Alexander demanding that the CDC change a previously published report on coronavirus risks to children; she said that the email was deleted but she does not know by whom. Following her testimony, the Trump administration canceled previously scheduled interviews with four other CDC scientists and officials.

In December, the former CDC chief of staff, Kyle McGowan, and his deputy, Amanda Campbell, gave a series of interviews about their experiences. They described a years-long and escalating White House campaign to control and suppress the CDC during their tenure from 2018 until August 2020. They said the agency's science had been denied, its voice suppressed, and its budget siphoned off. McGowan said, "Everyone wants to describe the day that the light switch flipped and the C.D.C. was sidelined. It didn’t happen that way. It was more of like a hand grasping something, and it slowly closes, closes, closes, closes until you realize that, middle of the summer (of 2020), it has a complete grasp on everything at the C.D.C."

=== U.S. federal government response to the COVID-19 pandemic ===
==== COVID-19 testing ====
At a campaign rally in Tulsa, Oklahoma on June 20, 2020, Trump claimed he had instructed his administration to slow down COVID-19 testing in order to keep the number of confirmed cases down.

In August 2020, Trump announced the appointment of radiologist Scott Atlas as a White House advisor on the coronavirus. According to task force official Deborah Birx, Atlas wanted to change testing guidelines to say that people without symptoms did not need to be tested. On August 24, 2020, the testing guidelines on the CDC web page were quietly changed from their earlier recommendation that testing is recommended for anyone who has come into contact with someone who has COVID-19; the new message said that such people do not need to be tested if they do not have symptoms. Multiple public health experts expressed alarm at the new guideline, because people can be contagious even if they have no symptoms, and early testing of exposed people is considered essential to track and suppress the spread of the virus. On September 17, it was reported that the new guidelines had been written by the White House coronavirus task force, and had been "dropped into" the CDC website by officials in the Department of Health and Human Services (HHS) without the knowledge of, or over the objections of, CDC scientists. A July document on "The importance of reopening schools" was also placed on the CDC website by HHS officials rather than CDC scientists. Two former directors of the CDC said that the notion of political appointees or non-scientists posting information to the CDC website is "absolutely chilling" and undermines the credibility of the institution. On September 18, the day after the manipulation of the CDC by political appointees was reported, the testing guideline was revised to its original recommendation, stressing that anyone who has been in contact with an infected person should be tested. In late October, two guidance documents, including "The importance of reopening schools," were quietly removed from the CDC website. The updated website now states that "the body of evidence is growing that children of all ages are susceptible to SARS-CoV-2 infection and contrary to early reports might play a role in transmission."

==== Treatments for COVID-19 ====
In early March, Trump directed the Food and Drug Administration (FDA) to test certain medications to discover if they had the potential to treat COVID-19 patients. Among these were chloroquine and hydroxychloroquine, which have been successfully used to treat malaria for over fifty years. On March 28, the FDA issued an Emergency Use Authorization (EUA) which allowed certain hospitalized COVID-19 patients to be treated with hydroxychloroquine or chloroquine. The FDA's emergency approval was limited to use in hospitals and clinical drug trials. But in April the White House, at the urging and under the direction of senior economic advisor Peter Navarro, set aside those limitations and ordered that 23 million hydroxychloroquine tablets from the Strategic National Stockpile of drugs be released to a dozen states. The drugs were ordered to be distributed not only to hospitals but also to retail pharmacies in five cities. It is unclear where all the pills ended up; one distributor said they were also sent to long-term care facilities, but none are known to have gone to retail pharmacies.

On June 8 Trump called NIH director Francis Collins to the White House to urge him to approve and promote hydroxycholoroquine as a treatment for COVID-19. Trump got golfer Jack Nicklaus on the phone to describe how he had recovered from the virus after taking the drug at Trump's urging. Collins explained that anecdotal stories do not prove anything, and said the research data did not support the use of the drug. A week later, on June 15, the FDA revoked the EUA for hydroxychloroquine and chloroquine as potential treatments for COVID-19. The FDA said the available evidence showed "no benefit for decreasing the likelihood of death or speeding recovery". On July 1, the FDA published a review of safety issues associated with the drugs, including fatal cardiac arrhythmias among other side effects. After the FDA withdrew its emergency authorization, health officials told holders of the pills from the Strategic National Stockpile that they could choose to return the pills to wholesalers or destroy them. As of late July, Trump was still promoting the use of hydroxychloroquine for COVID-19, despite the position of the NIH that the drug was "very unlikely to be beneficial to hospitalized patients with COVID-19".

In August, Trump pushed to get speedy approval of convalescent plasma as a COVID-19 treatment, because he wanted to be able to announce it as a treatment breakthrough at the August 2020 Republican National Convention. A week before the convention he claimed in a tweet that people within the FDA were deliberately delaying approval of treatments and vaccines in order to hurt his chances of re-election; he tagged FDA Commissioner Stephen Hahn in the tweet. The National Institutes of Health (NIH) had concerns about the effectiveness of the treatment. On the Wednesday before the convention Trump phoned Francis S. Collins, head of the NIH, and ordered him to "get it done by Friday." On the eve of the convention the NIH still had concerns, but Trump announced that the FDA had given emergency authorization for plasma therapy to be more widely used. In his announcement he greatly exaggerated the effectiveness of the treatment, calling it a major breakthrough and suggesting it might save the lives of 35% of coronavirus patients. The FDA approval had been much more limited in its scope and application, but Hahn initially echoed the president's claims, for which he apologized the next day.

==== Mask wearing ====
In September, the CDC drafted an order that would require passengers and employees to wear masks on all forms of public and commercial transportation in the United States, including airplanes, trains, buses, subways, and transit hubs. Transportation unions had requested a federal mandate for mask wearing, citing the difficulty of working under a patchwork of rules. HHS Secretary Azar and CDC Director Redfield strongly supported the order. However, the White House's coronavirus task force, which is supposed to sign off on all coronavirus actions, rejected the order, saying that such orders should be left up to states and local governments.

==== Advice on reopening ====
The CDC intended to release on May 1 a 17-page report called Guidance for Implementing the Opening Up America Again Framework, with detailed guidelines for the reopening of businesses, public transit, restaurants, religious organizations, schools, and other public places which had been ordered closed during the pandemic. However, the Trump administration shelved the document; CDC staffers were told the recommendations "would never see the light of day." An unauthorized copy was published by the Associated Press in late April. Six flowcharts were ultimately published on May 15, and a sixty-page set of guidelines was released without comment on May 20, weeks after many states had already opened up from lockdowns.

In July 2020, as Trump pushed publicly for all schools to reopen fully, a CDC report on the subject came under pressure from the White House, the White House coronavirus task force, and the office of the Vice President. Officials including Deborah Birx of the task force and Olivia Troye of Pence's staff pressed for the report to play down any risks involved in in-person schooling, and to stress the need for children to be in school for mental health reasons. When the report, intended to guide parents by giving them a basis for decision making, was ready for distribution on July 23, it was distributed to multiple White House officials who were allowed to make edits. Among other things, a claim was inserted that the coronavirus was less deadly to children than seasonal flu—a claim which CDC scientists had objected to earlier in the week. The title of the final document was The Importance of Reopening America’s Schools this Fall.

On September 29, the White House coronavirus task force overruled the CDC's recommendation regarding when passenger cruise ships should be allowed to resume sailing. The existing "no-sail" directive was scheduled to expire on September 30. CDC Director Redfield wanted to extend it to mid-February 2021. The task force instead agreed with the cruise ship industry's recommendation that the prohibition end on October 31, 2020.

White House advisor Scott Atlas opposed closure of schools and businesses, saying the best approach was to promote "population immunity" by letting younger people get the virus while protecting the most vulnerable. He doubts the effectiveness of face masks to combat spread of the virus. He claimed that children have a very low risk of death or serious illness and "almost never transmit the disease". Atlas quickly became influential within the administration; Trump welcomed his recommendations, which were in accord with Trump's own preferences, and reduced the role of other advisors such as Birx and Fauci. On October 5, HHS Secretary Azar met with three epidemiologists who promoted the Great Barrington Declaration, a petition calling for an end to lockdown policies, instead protecting the most vulnerable in the population while allowing the virus to spread uncontrolled among healthy people while they live normal lives. Atlas attended the meeting and later said that he supported this approach. Other epidemiologists said this approach is dangerous because "If you do this, you’ll get more infections, more hospitalizations and more deaths." The World Health Organization and most experts preferred to prevent infection through practices like hygiene, masks, and social distancing. Azar had earlier told Congress that "herd immunity is not the strategy of the U.S. government". After the meeting he tweeted that he had met with the group to obtain "diverse scientific perspectives", adding that "We heard strong reinforcement of the Trump Administration’s strategy of aggressively protecting the vulnerable while opening schools and the workplace."

On October 19, The Washington Post reported that Atlas had consolidated his control over the White House coronavirus task force, sidelining other physicians including Birx, Fauci, Redfield, and Hahn, and challenging their analyses and recommendations. He vetoed any expansion of testing and claimed that practices like social distancing and mask wearing are worthless. He echoed Trump's claims that the pandemic was nearly over and that a vaccine was imminent. In mid-October Atlas posted a series of tweets saying that masks do not work; Twitter removed the posts for violating the site's policy against coronavirus misinformation.

==== Vaccine development and approval ====
Trump stressed the need for a COVID-19 vaccine as soon as possible, and said one is being developed at "warp speed" (see Operation Warp Speed). He repeatedly suggested that a COVID-19 vaccine would be available before the end of 2020, possibly before the November 3 election. In mid-September 2020, Trump's chief of staff Mark Meadows predicted that 100 million doses of a vaccine would be available by the end of October, though CDC Director Robert Redfield told the Senate that the public should not expect vaccine distribution before mid-2021. Other federal scientists including Operation Warp Speed chief scientist Moncef Slaoui and NIAID director Fauci also said that Meadows' prediction was unlikely, given the time frame needed for clinical trials. Trump dismissed or contradicted these comments. When Redfield told a congressional committee that wearing a mask could be more effective in halting the spread of the disease than a vaccine, and that a vaccine would not be generally available to the public until the second or third quarter of 2021, Trump said that Redfield had "made a mistake" and that his vaccine prediction was "just incorrect information." Republican allies of the president endorsed Trump's comments; House Minority Leader Kevin McCarthy said "If I just take the words of the CDC and the president, the president is right." On September 21, Trump predicted a vaccine would be available "within a matter of weeks". The next day Fauci said it was impossible to know when a vaccine would be available, because "no one's seen the data"; the clinical trials were still "blinded" so that no one knew how the test groups and control groups compare to each other. Fauci had previously said that the efficacy of a vaccine might first become known in November or December.

In late September, the FDA said it planned to announce additional criteria for emergency approval of a vaccine: to ensure that the vaccine is safe and effective, the clinical trial reportedly must follow trial participants for at least two months after their second shot, and the placebo group must show at least five severe cases of COVID-19 and some cases in older people. The move came following urging from Eric Topol and other public health experts, who believed that delaying the release of a vaccine until after the third week in November would increase trust among the public. The agency said it wanted to make its criteria public to bolster public trust in the process, as polling showed nearly half of the public would reject any vaccine they regard as rushed and politically tainted. At a press conference the next day, Trump said that the White House "may or may not" approve the new guidelines, saying it “sounds like a political move”. The White House blocked action on the guidelines for several weeks, objecting to the two-month-followup provision which would make it highly unlikely that a vaccine could be approved by election day. However, on October 6, the FDA unilaterally published the guidelines on its website, following which the White House approved them. Trump complained about the White House approval, claiming that the stricter guidelines were a conspiracy against his re-election. For months, FDA administrator Hahn stated that "science, not politics" would govern the FDA's decisions on whether to approve companies' applications for approval for COVID-19 vaccines.

In late October, Politico reported that HHS chief Azar was trying to get permission to fire FDA administrator Hahn over the FDA's insistence that a COVID-19 vaccine meet safety standards before being approved. On December 10, a standing committee of outside scientists reviewed the application for the Pfizer/BioNTech vaccine, and late that afternoon they recommended that the FDA authorize it for emergency use. The next morning, December 11, Trump ordered FDA Commissioner Hahn via Twitter to "stop playing games and start saving lives!!!", adding "Get the dam [sic] vaccines out NOW, Dr. Hahn." The same morning White House chief of staff Mark Meadows reportedly told Hahn in a telephone call that Hahn would be out of a job if he didn't give FDA approval to the vaccine that day; Hahn later said that report was inaccurate and he was merely "encouraged to continue working expeditiously." The FDA, which was already planning to issue the authorization the morning of December 12, issued it the evening of December 11 instead, a change which was not expected to affect the timeline for delivery of the first shots. Scholars were critical of the Trump administration's effort to pressure the FDA during its safety and effectiveness review; Ashish Jha, dean of the Brown University School of Public Health, said the campaign was an "unforced error" that "creates a veneer of political meddling" and reduced public confidence in the vaccine.

== Environmental agencies ==
=== Department of Agriculture ===
The Trump administration marginalized the role of science at the U.S. Department of Agriculture (USDA) and oversaw the mass departure of career USDA scientists. In July 2019, two USDA agencies—the Economic Research Service (ERS) and the National Institute of Food and Agriculture—were directed to move from the USDA's headquarters in Washington, D.C. to the Kansas City metropolitan area. Two-thirds of the USDA employees reassigned chose to quit rather than accept relocation. Current and former employees of the ERS were strongly critical of the relocation to Kansas City and other Trump administration policies, and the exodus of scientific and economic talent and disruption to federal research (especially on climate change and food security) that they had caused. The move to Kansas City area resulted in an attrition rate particularly high in the Resource and Rural Economics Division (90%) and in the Food Economics Division (up to 89%). ERS economists said that the Trump administration's moves were retaliation against the agency for publishing research reports detailing the negative economic effects of Trump's policies, including tariffs and Republican tax legislation, on U.S. agriculture.

In April 2018, Agriculture Secretary Sonny Perdue's office ordered ERS and other research components of USDA to include a disclaimer on peer-reviewed research authored by USDA scientists and published in scientific journals; the disclaimer was to state that findings and conclusions were "preliminary" and "should not be construed to represent any agency determination or policy." Susan Offutt, the ERS administrator under the Clinton and George W. Bush administrations, said that the requirement was contrary to the USDA's longstanding policy that permitted and encouraged federal scientists to publish work in journals. The "disclaimer" mandate was strongly criticized by USDA employees, science advocates, and scientific journal editors. In May 2019, following an outcry, the USDA rescinded the directive.

In April 2020, USDA established a "Farmers to Families Food Box" program, which paid farmers for food that would normally be destined for restaurants, repackaged it into household quantities, and distributed it to food-insecure Americans. Starting in summer 2020, some of the boxes included a letter signed by Trump, recommending coronavirus precautions and concluding "Together we will overcome this challenge, and our Nation will emerge from this crisis stronger than ever before." By September, the department was requiring all contracted distributors to include the letter in every box. Regarding the letters as election-related advertising, many food banks, schools, and other nonprofit agencies removed the letters before distributing the food, citing the provision of U.S. tax law barring non-profits from engaging in political activity.

=== Hurricane Dorian–Alabama controversy ===
On September 1, 2019, as Hurricane Dorian approached the U.S. mainland, Trump commented on Twitter about the hurricane and incorrectly mentioned Alabama as one of the states that was threatened by the approaching storm. In fact the forecast on September 1 was that Dorian would steer well away from Alabama, so that Trump apparently relied on information that was several days old. About 20 minutes after Trump's tweet, the Birmingham, Alabama office of the National Weather Service (NWS) issued a tweet that appeared to contradict Trump, saying that Alabama "will NOT see any impacts from Dorian". The Birmingham office was unaware of Trump's tweet but was responding to a flood of phone calls and other questions about whether the storm was going to hit Alabama. Later that day and over the following days, as the hurricane moved up the coast and Alabama felt no effects from it, Trump insisted repeatedly and falsely that he had been right about the hurricane threatening the state. On September 4, at a briefing in the Oval Office he falsely insisted that his Alabama comment had been correct, and displayed a forecast map dated August 29 which had been altered with a black marker to extend the cone of uncertainty of the hurricane's possible path into southern Alabama; the incident became known as Sharpiegate.

On September 6, NOAA published an unsigned statement in support of Trump's initial claim, saying that NHC models "demonstrated that tropical-storm-force winds from Hurricane Dorian could impact Alabama." The statement also said the message from the Birmingham NWS office had been incorrect because it "spoke in absolute terms that were inconsistent with probabilities from the best forecast products available at the time." The statement was widely criticized as "political", "utterly disgusting and disingenuous", and with "no scientific basis". The Inspector General of the Department of Commerce investigated the memorandum, saying that it called into question "the NWS’s processes, scientific independence, and ability to communicate accurate and timely weather warnings and data to the nation in times of national emergency." Her investigation confirmed that the September 6 statement had been issued by Commerce officials in response to direct orders from the White House. The report said that White House chief of staff Mick Mulvaney had instructed Commerce Secretary Wilbur Ross to get NOAA to issue a statement supporting the president's claims, and Mulvaney and Ross both approved the statement before it was issued. Another investigation reported that the acting NOAA administrator and his deputy chief of staff had also been involved with issuing the report. NOAA's acting chief scientist said "If not the single highest person in NOAA, who will stand for the Scientific Integrity of the agency and the trust our public needs to invest in our scientific process and products?" The Assistant Secretary of Commerce for Environmental Observation and Prediction wrote in an email to another NOAA scientist, "you have no idea how hard I'm fighting to keep politics out of science."

=== Environmental Protection Agency ===
On January 24, 2017, it was reported that the Trump administration froze grants and contracts to the EPA, along with employees being unable to speak to reporters or post on social media accounts.

In a May 2018 survey, the EPA inspector general's office found that nearly 400 science-related employees said they had experienced, but did not report, potential violations of the EPA's scientific integrity policy. More than 250 employees said their concern was that a manager or senior leader had possibly interfered with science, and nearly 175 said they had experienced "suppression or delay of release of scientific report or information." Commenters said they had observed "suppression, changes, manipulation, or exclusion of scientific information, results, or research." They said people in senior positions, particularly political appointees, often do not understand or adequately consider science in their decisions, and they expressed a belief that their leadership is "greatly influenced by political, industry, state, or regulated groups."

==== Climate change policy ====
Global warming

The people that gave you global warming are the same people that gave you ObamaCare!

— Tweet of Donald Trump
Nov. 23, 2013

Democrats and Republicans differ in views of the seriousness of climate change, with the gap widening in the 2010s and Democrats more than three times as likely to view it as a major threat.

Before his election Trump promised to trim the Environmental Protection Agency (EPA). At a Republican primary debate in Detroit on March 3, 2016, he said: "Department of Environmental Protection: We are going to get rid of it in almost every form. We’re going to have little tidbits left. But we’re going to take a tremendous amount out." Trump appointed Scott Pruitt, a climate change denier, as the EPA administrator. Under his leadership the EPA focused on promoting fossil fuel energy and repealing regulations regarding clean air, clean water, and federal lands.

Although there is an overwhelming scientific consensus that global surface temperatures have increased in recent decades due to human-induced emissions of greenhouse gases, Trump claimed that scientists are divided on the causes of climate change. Following Trump's election, large amounts of climate information from the EPA website was altered or removed. There was widespread concern among environmentalists and scientists, and a coalition of scientific and academic groups began to make copies of the EPA web pages before they were deleted. According to the Environmental Data & Governance Initiative which tracks changes to government websites under the Trump administration, over 200 web pages providing climate information were removed during Trump's first year in office. Other pages were altered, often under Pruitt's personal direction, to remove mentions of climate and climate change.

==== Wetlands and waterways ====
In June 2017, Pruitt was preparing to undo the Waters of the United States rule, a regulation giving federal protection to wetlands and tributaries that flow into federally protected major waterways. An 87-page analysis had concluded that such protection would cost real estate developers and farmers between $236 million and $465 million, but would provide benefits of between $555 million and $572 million in reducing water pollution. Pruitt's deputies verbally ordered the analysts to produce a new study leaving out the quantifiable benefits. "They did what they were told", according to a 30-year administrator in the agency's water office. The administrator added that such analyses typically take months or years and are supported by research and a paper trail, but "This repeal process is political staff giving verbal directions to get the outcome they want, essentially overnight."

==== Trichloroethylene ====
In February 2020, the EPA released a report on the toxicity of the industrial chemical trichloroethylene (TCE), establishing the benchmark for unsafe exposure levels. Instead of the benchmark established by the agency's scientists, namely an exposure level known to cause fetal heart abnormalities, their draft report produced after three years' work had been completely altered to establish a much less stringent benchmark. All references to "cardiac toxicity" were eliminated. The report that was eventually published established autoimmune disease as the endpoint—a criterion allowing nearly 500 times as much TCE exposure. The report had been rewritten at the urging of chemical industry lobbyists and on direct orders from the Executive Office of the President.

==== Other deregulatory efforts ====
In the final months of Trump's first presidential term, Trump administration EPA appointees aimed to finalize new regulations to block the future adoption of restrictions on air and water pollution. The efforts were opposed by medical and scientific groups, as well as career EPA scientists, including Thomas Sinks, who was director of the agency's science advisory office and its office on data security and the privacy of human subjects. Before retiring in September 2020, Sinks issued a rare, strongly worded "dissenting scientific opinion" against the adoption of a new regulation, pushed by Trump's appointees, that would require the EPA to disregard scientific or medical research that did not make raw data (including personal health information) public. The regulation would stymie the ability of the EPA to regulate pollution on the basis of long-term health or epidemiological studies on toxin exposure, because the subjects of such studies usually participate on the condition that their personal health information remains private. By placing his dissent on the official agency record, Sinks signaled that Trump political appointees had dismissed career scientists' views on the proposal, and provided the Biden administration with evidence to repeal the rule.

== Other agencies ==
A supervisor at the Department of Energy told employees not to use the terms "climate change", "emissions reduction," or "Paris Agreement" in any written communication. These were described as "hot button" terms better avoided, with the suggestion that it would be better to use words like "jobs" and "infrastructure".

In March 2020, The New York Times reported that Indur M. Goklany, a science and technology policy analyst at the Department of the Interior, repeatedly inserted climate change denial language into the agency's scientific reports, such as those that affect water and mineral rights. The wording inserted into the documents includes assertions that there is a lack of consensus for global warming among scientists and that increased atmospheric carbon dioxide is beneficial.

== Responses and reactions ==
=== Anthony Fauci ===
After Trump left office, Dr. Anthony Fauci, the director of the National Institute of Allergy and Infectious Diseases (NIAID) since 1984, spoke of the difficulties that he and other scientists faced under the Trump administration. He described working under the Biden administration as "a refreshing experience", said that he felt "uncomfortable" when Trump publicly made statements that "were not based on scientific fact", and indicated that he had felt silenced under Trump.

Fauci, who has served under seven presidents, told The Atlantic, "With every other president, whether they were conservative, moderate, or liberal, the guidepost for everything was a deep respect for science. That was always the case. When I got involved with Trump, it went into a different world, the likes of which I had not experienced. I was used to being in the White House because of my work in previous administrations, but the White House became a different place in the Trump administration." Fauci said that Scott Atlas, brought into the coronavirus task force by Trump, was "a complete foil to poor Debbie Birx" and said, "I felt so bad for her, because he completely undermined her. He didn't undermine me, because I didn't give a shit about him. I didn't really care what he said, because my home base was [NIAID]. But Deb's home base was the White House." Fauci added that he did not "take any great pleasure in contradicting" Trump, but felt obliged to do so "as a symbol to the rest of the world that science is not going to flinch in the face of somebody who's spouting nonsense." Fauci said that Birx had repeatedly told him that her experience in the Trump White House was "the worst, most painful 11 months of my entire life."

=== Congressional investigations ===
Democratic members of the House of Representatives launched several investigations. The House Select Committee on the Coronavirus Crisis investigated claims that political employees of the HHS pressured scientists to alter data or change their recommendations related to the coronavirus pandemic. The lawmakers requested interviews with seven HHS employees. In December 2020, the committee subpoenaed HHS Secretary Azar and CDC Director Redfield for documents pertaining to their investigation, alleging that "Trump administration appointees attempted to alter or block at least 14 scientific reports related to the virus." In February 2021, the coronavirus committee asked the Biden administration for documents relating to the Trump administration's handling of the coronavirus pandemic, saying that Trump's HHS and other officials had blocked requests for documents and staff testimony in spite of "two subpoenas and at least 20 document requests." In April, the committee released documents indicating that Paul Alexander and other officials touted instances where they successfully blocked or altered scientists' reports to make them more optimistic. In December, the committee released a report stating that officials in the Trump administration had made "deliberate efforts to undermine the nation's coronavirus response for political purposes".

In September 2020, the heads of three oversight committees launched an investigation into a planned advertising blitz by HHS to "defeat despair and inspire hope" about the pandemic. The stated goal was to "install confidence to return to work and restart the economy." Democrats questioned whether the $250 million ad campaign had political motivations, noting that it was proposed and supervised by Caputo. They also asked where the money was to come from, and requested that the program's launch be delayed while their investigation is underway.

In early October 2020, a subcommittee of the House Oversight Committee opened an investigation into an agency within the Executive Office of the President, to determine whether there had been political interference with the government's messaging about the coronavirus.

The Government Accountability Office, an independent auditing and investigative branch of Congress, announced on October 20, 2020, that it will investigate potential political interference by the Trump administration into the CDC and the FDA and "determine whether this interference has violated the agencies’ scientific integrity and communication policies." The agency was responding to a request from three Democratic senators to "determine whether the CDC and FDA's scientific integrity and communications policies have been violated." The office expected to begin studying the issue in January 2021 due to staff availability.

=== Employee complaints to EPA inspector general and scientific integrity office ===
Dozens of current and former employees of the EPA, Fish and Wildlife Service, and Army Corps of Engineers filed a complaint with the inspector general of the EPA regarding political interference during the repeal of the Waters of the United States rule. Senator Tom Carper asked the EPA inspector general to investigate why only politically appointed attorneys and not career attorneys were listed as the attorneys of record on multiple court filings involving greenhouse gas emissions and water pollution. Inquiries, complaints, and requests for advice "spiked" with the EPA's Scientific Integrity office. Reportedly they received about 20 inquiries per year from 2012 to 2016, but got more than 60 inquiries during the first three quarters of the 2019 fiscal year; about half of them related to political interference with scientific work.

=== Rick Bright whistleblowing ===
In May 2020, the House Energy and Commerce Committee heard testimony from Rick Bright, a career scientist who was removed from his position as director of the Biomedical Advanced Research and Development Authority (BARDA) for warning about problems with the administration's response to the coronavirus. Bright had filed a whistleblower complaint with the Office of Special Counsel. In the complaint, Bright said that his ouster and demotion were illegal retaliation by the Trump administration due to his warnings about the virus, his opposition to political interference in decision-making, and his objections to the promotion of hydroxychloroquine as a COVID-19 treatment without scientific evidence. The U.S. Office of Special Counsel determined that there were "reasonable grounds to believe" that the Trump administration's HHS had unlawfully retaliated against Bright, in violation of the Whistleblower Protection Act, "because he made protected disclosures in the best interest of the American public." The office recommended that Bright be reinstated as head of BARDA while the investigation is undertaken. However, the recommendation was not binding on HHS, and was not honored by the agency. On October 6, 2020, Bright resigned from the government. In an addendum to his whistleblower complaint, Bright stated that, following his demotion, he had been given "no meaningful work" since September 4; that NIH officials had rejected his proposals for a national COVID-19 testing strategy "because of political considerations"; and that officials had ignored his request that he join the $10 billion Operation Warp Speed initiative to develop a COVID-19 vaccine.

=== National academy criticisms ===
In September 2020, the presidents of the National Academy of Sciences and the National Academy of Medicine issued a joint statement saying, "We find ongoing reports and incidents of the politicization of science, particularly the overriding of evidence and advice from public health officials and derision of government scientists, to be alarming. It undermines the credibility of public health agencies and the public’s confidence in them when we need it most." The statement was issued the day after Trump suggested he might veto an FDA proposal to raise the standards for emergency approval of a coronavirus vaccine. They added, "Policymaking must be informed by the best available evidence without it being distorted, concealed, or otherwise deliberately miscommunicated.... Ending the pandemic will require decision-making that is not only based on science but also sufficiently transparent to ensure public trust in, and adherence to, sound public-health instructions. Any efforts to discredit the best science and scientists threaten the health and welfare of us all."

=== Medical journal criticism ===
In October 2020, the New England Journal of Medicine, in an editorial signed by 34 editors, denounced the Trump administration's handling of the COVID-19 pandemic. The article marked the first time in the medical journal's 200-year history that it had condemned or supported any political candidate. In the editorial, the journal strongly criticized the Trump administration's rejection of scientific expertise; its attempts to politicize and undermine the FDA, NIH, and CDC; and its decision "to ignore and even denigrate experts" within government institutions.

== Aftermath ==
Hundreds of scientists and policy experts in multiple agencies left their positions during the Trump administration. Six months into the Biden administration, they had not returned, and recruitment of replacements proved difficult – in part because young scientists no longer trust that their agencies will remain insulated from politics. Just in the area of climate and environmental science, hundreds of scientific and technical positions remained vacant as of July 2021. A former oceanographer for the U.S. Geologic Survey explained that "It’s easy and quick to leave government, not so quick for government to regain the talent."

As of January 2023 the EPA is "still reeling from the exodus of more than 1,200 scientists and policy experts during the Trump administration" and is short staffed in almost all departments, causing increased workloads. The head of the chemical unit said the workload in turn makes it hard to attract and retain staff. The enforcement unit is prosecuting polluters at the lowest rate in two decades. The department is behind its deadlines to write the new regulations necessary for Biden’s climate goals.

== See also ==
- The Republican War on Science – 2005 book by Chris Mooney
- 2025 United States government online resource removals
- Science policy of the second Trump administration
