= The Ukraine Hoax: Impeachment, Biden Cash, and Mass Murder =

2020 propaganda film

The intelligence report with a reference to "... a documentary that aired on a US television network in late January 2020".

The Ukraine Hoax: Impeachment, Biden Cash, and Mass Murder is a 2020 propaganda film promoting the Biden–Ukraine conspiracy theory. Several news outlets have suggested that this documentary was propaganda produced by Russian intelligence agents Konstantin Kilimnik (Note: Konstantin Kilimnik is an associate of Paul Manafort who described Kilimnik as Manafort's "Russian Brain".) and Andrii Derkach, an inference made after a declassified US intelligence report stated that a "documentary that aired on a US television network in late January 2020" was Russian propaganda but did not specify the network or documentary.

The film was made by Michael Caputo, a former Trump advisor who had served as the spokesman for the Department of Health and Human Services, and co-produced by Sergey Petrushin, who is a Russian living in Miami and a close associate of Caputo for over 25 years. Purporting to "expose Biden-Obama corruption" related to Ukraine, it aired at the same time Donald Trump was facing a Senate impeachment trial for withholding military aid from Ukraine while pressuring the country to launch criminal investigations targeting the Bidens. Andrii Derkach, who is a member of the Russian intelligence community, and Andrii Telizhenko, who is a close associate of Rudy Giuliani, supported Caputo and Petrushin on the documentary. The film aired on the One America News Network (OANN) on 21 January 2020, only two weeks before the Senate's acquittal of Donald Trump.
