= Konstantin Kilimnik =

Russian-Ukrainian political consultant (born 1970)

- Константин Килимник (Russian); Костянтин Килимник (Ukrainian)
- Born: 27 April 1970 (age 56); Kryvyi Rih, Ukrainian SSR, Soviet Union
- Citizenship: Ukraine; Russia; Soviet Union
- Occupation: Political consultant
- Known for: Russian interference in the 2016 United States elections

Konstantin Viktorovich Kilimnik (Russian: Константин Викторович Килимник; Ukrainian: Костянтин Вікторович Килимник, romanized: Kostiantyn Viktorovych Kylymnyk; born 27 April 1970) is a Russian–Ukrainian political consultant. In the United States, he became a person of interest in multiple investigations regarding Russian interference in the 2016 United States elections, particularly due to his ties with Paul Manafort, an American political consultant, who was a campaign chairman for Donald Trump.

Kilimnik was reported by CNN, The New York Times and The Atlantic to be "Person A" listed in court documents filed by the Special Counsel against Manafort. He is also believed to be Person A in court documents filed in the criminal indictment of Alex van der Zwaan. The April 2019 Mueller Report concluded Kilimnik was connected to Russian intelligence agencies, while the August 2020 final report on 2016 election interference from the Senate Intelligence Committee characterized him as a "Russian intelligence officer". In 2017, Kilimnik said he had no connection to Russian or any other intelligence service. Kilimnik was indicted by Special Counsel Robert Mueller's grand jury on 8 June 2018 on charges of obstruction of justice and conspiracy to obstruct justice by attempting to tamper with a witness on behalf of Manafort.

United States intelligence community analysis released in March 2021 accused Kilimnik of being one of the proxies of Russian intelligence who promoted and laundered misleading or unsubstantiated narratives about Joe Biden to US media organizations, US officials, and prominent US individuals, including some close to former President Trump and his administration" to benefit the 2020 Trump presidential campaign. In April 2021, the US Treasury Department sanctioned Kilimnik for providing Russian intelligence with "sensitive information on polling and campaign strategy" provided to him by Manafort from the Trump campaign, and for making the unjustified claim that Ukraine, rather than Russia, had interfered in the 2016 election.

== Early life ==
Kilimnik was born on 27 April 1970 at Kryvyi Rih, Ukraine, Soviet Union. Fluent in Russian and Ukrainian before his service in the Soviet Army, he became fluent in Swedish and English as a linguist at the Moscow Military Institute of the Ministry of Defense, which trained interpreters for the Soviet Union's Main Intelligence Directorate, known as the GRU of the Soviet Union. He was a translator in the Soviet Army and worked closely with its GRU. He took Russian citizenship after the dissolution of the Soviet Union. He worked in Sweden as an interpreter for a Russian arms dealer.

Kilimnik worked for the International Republican Institute (IRI) in Moscow from 1995 to early 2005; the IRI is an organisation which receives funding from the United States government to support democracy. According to anonymous sources, when applying for his position with the IRI, he responded to the question about how he learned English by stating that the "Russian military intelligence" taught him and he became known among Moscow political operatives as "Kostya, the guy from the GRU". In 1997, he traveled to the United States using a Russian diplomatic passport. The New York Times reported two former IRI colleagues said Kilimnik was dismissed in April 2005 after the chief of Russian Federation's Federal Security Service gave a speech discussing internal private meetings at the institute. Kilimnik was suspected of leaking details of an IRI meeting in Bratislava, Slovakia. Kilimnik himself told The New York Times in April 2018 that he had been dismissed for having freelanced as an interpreter for Manafort, which was effectively confirmed by a spokesman for the IRI who said such an action ran counter to the organization's code of ethics. Nearly a year later in February 2019, an IRI representative declined to say whether Kilimnik leaving the organisation had any connection to Kilimnik's alleged links to Russian intelligence. In the Mueller Report, a former colleague is reported to have told the FBI that Kilimnik was fired because of his strong links to Russian intelligence services.

== Employment by Manafort ==
Recruited by Philip M. Griffin as a translator for businessman Rinat Akhmetov and seeking a better income than available at IRI, Kilimnik met Paul Manafort in 2005 and became an employee of Manafort's consulting firm. After the end of his association with IRI in April 2005, he lived and worked in Kyiv and Moscow while his wife and two children remained in Moscow living in a modest house near the Sheremetyevo International Airport. Some reports say Kilimnik ran the Kyiv office of Manafort's firm, Davis Manafort International, and was Manafort's right-hand man in Kyiv. They began working for Viktor Yanukovych after the 2004 Orange Revolution cost him the Presidency. With help from Manafort and Kilimnik, Yanukovych became president in 2010. Kilimnik told RFE/RL in February 2017 that he spent 90% of his time inside the Presidential administration, and assisted Manafort.

From 2011 to 2013, with liaison to Viktor Yanukovych's chief of staff Serhiy Lyovochkin, Kilimnik, Manafort, Alan Friedman, Eckart Sager, who was a one time CNN producer, and Rick Gates advised on an international public relations strategy. This effort supported the administration of President of Ukraine Viktor Yanukovych. Yanukovych hired Manafort's company Global Endeavour, a St. Vincent and Grenadines based consulting and lobbying company, which during the end of Yanukovych's presidency transferred $750,000 out of Ukraine and also paid Kilimnik $53,000 during November and December 2013. When Yanukovych fled the country, Manafort and Kilimnik gained employment with the Ukrainian party Opposition Bloc which is backed by the same oligarchs who backed Yanukovych. At some point, Opposition Bloc ceased paying Manafort's firm but even though the non-payment forced Manafort's firm to shut down their Kyiv office, Kilimnik continued to advise the party while working to collect unpaid fees for Manafort's firm.

Around 2010, Kilimnik collaborated with Rinat Akhmetshin when the Washington-based lobbyist was trying to sell a book disparaging one of Yanukovych's opponents.

Kilimnik and Manafort actively assisted Ukrainian oligarchs and Russian oligarchs who are close to the Kremlin and Vladimir Putin. Also, they worked to ensure that Viktor Yanukovych and his Party of Regions would reduce and eventually sever Ukraine's ties to the United States and Europe so that Ukraine would become much closer to Russia, the Kremlin, and Vladimir Putin.

In a February 22, 2017, interview with Christopher Miller of Radio Free Europe, Kilimnik explained the existence of a peace effort between Russia and Ukraine called the "Mariupol Plan" in which Viktor Yanukovych would return as president of Russia's illegally controlled regions and Crimea in Ukraine. Andriy Artemenko's peace plan was known as the "New initiative for Peace".

In 2017, Kilimnik helped Manafort write an op-ed for a Kyiv newspaper. A journalist in Ukraine, Oleg Voloshyn, has disputed this assertion stating that he and Manafort wrote the op-ed and that he e-mailed the rough draft to Kilimnik. The op-ed may have violated a gag order issued against Manafort by a US court and may have been a breach of Manafort's bail conditions.

In 2018, CNBC reported Kilimnik to be variously "described as a fixer, translator or office manager to Donald Trump’s ex-campaign chairman, Paul Manafort.

== Prosecutor General of Ukraine investigation of Kilimnik ==
From August until December 2016, Prosecutor General of Ukraine Yuriy Lutsenko conducted an investigation into Konstantin Kilimnik but did not arrest him. Kilimnik managed Davis Manafort International in Kyiv. Kilimnik left Ukraine for Russia in June 2016. Davis Manafort International in Kyiv had been accused of money laundering by Robert Mueller's Special Counsel investigation. Mueller considered Kilimnik a vital witness in the Russian interference in the 2016 United States elections. The National Anti-Corruption Bureau informed the United States Department of State that Lutsenko had both thwarted Ukraine's investigation into Kilimink and allowed Kilimnik to leave Ukraine for Russia.

== Mentions in court filings ==
Kilimnik has been reported by The New York Times to be the "Person A" in Court filings in December 2017 against Manafort and Rick Gates.

Court filings in late March 2018 allege that Gates knew that Kilimnik was a former officer with the Russian military intelligence service. These came after Gates reached a plea deal in exchange for cooperation in the investigation. The sentencing memo for Alex van der Zwaan filed by Special Counsel Robert S. Mueller states that Gates told van der Zwaan that Person A, believed to be Kilimnik, was a former intelligence officer with the Russian Main Intelligence Directorate (GRU).

Kilimnik also featured in the documents filed by Mueller in early December 2018 that explained why he believed Manafort had lied to investigators during the investigation conducted by Mueller's team.

=== Indictment ===
On 8 June 2018, Kilimnik was indicted by Mueller on charges of obstruction of justice and conspiracy to obstruct justice, in conjunction with Manafort, regarding unregistered lobbying work. According to their 2021 website, "The FBI is offering a reward of up to $250,000 for information leading to the arrest of Konstantin Viktorovich Kilimnik."

== Connection to the Trump campaign ==
Through numerous regular email exchanges, Kilimnik conferred with Manafort after Manafort became Donald Trump's campaign manager in April 2016 and requested that Manafort give "private briefings" about the Trump campaign to Oleg Deripaska, a Russian billionaire and close ally to Vladimir Putin. On 2 August 2016, Kilimnik met with Manafort and Rick Gates at the Grand Havana Room at 666 Fifth Avenue. The encounter which, according to prosecutor Andrew Weissmann goes "very much to the heart of what the special counsel’s office is investigating," included a handoff by Manafort of internal polling data from Trump's presidential campaign to Kilimnik. Gates later testified the three left the premises separately, each using different exits.

According to Mueller's court filings, Kilimnik was still working with Russian intelligence when, during September and October 2016, he was known to be communicating with the Trump campaign. Both Rick Gates and Paul Manafort were in contact with him at the time. Manafort has said that he and Kilimnik discussed the Democratic National Committee cyber attack and release of emails, now known to be undertaken by Russian hacker groups known as Cozy Bear and Fancy Bear.

Kilimnik and Manafort had been involved in the Pericles Fund together, an unsuccessful business venture financed by Oleg Deripaska. In July 2016, Manafort told Kilimnik to offer Deripaska private information in exchange for resolving multimillion-dollar disputes about the venture.

In a 2018 classified State Department assessment, Ukraine's former Prosecutor General Yuri Lutsenko allowed Kilimnik to escape from Ukraine to Russia after the US federal grand jury charged Kilimnik with obstruction of justice. The New York Times reported on 31 August 2018 that an unnamed Russian political operative and a Ukrainian businessman had illegally purchased four tickets to the inauguration of Donald Trump on behalf of Kilimnik. The tickets, valued at $50,000, were purchased with funds that had flowed through a Cypriot bank account. The transaction was facilitated by Sam Patten, an American lobbyist who had related work with Paul Manafort and pleaded guilty to failing to register as a foreign agent. Kilimnik attended Trump's inauguration.

In January 2019, Manafort's lawyers submitted a filing to the court, in response to the Special Counsel's accusation that he had lied to investigators while supposedly co-operating with them. Through an error in redacting, the document accidentally revealed that while he was campaign chairman, Manafort met with Kilimnik, gave him polling data related to the 2016 campaign, and discussed a Ukrainian peace plan with him. Most of the polling data was reportedly public, although some was private Trump campaign polling data. (Note: According to the Mueller Report, Manafort shared with Kilimnik, who was to give the private information to Oleg Deripaska, 2016 Trump Campaign's confidential polling data from Pennsylvania, Michigan, Wisconsin, and Minnesota in which states many Russian GRU agents were covertly targeting in support of Trump's campaign especially during the final days of the 2016 campaign.) Manafort asked Kilimnik to pass the data to Ukrainians Serhiy Lyovochkin and Rinat Akhmetov. Manafort also asked Kilimnik to pass polling data to Oleg Deripaska who is close to Putin.

Kilimnik, Andrii Derkach, who is a member of the Russian intelligence community and very close to Rudy Giuliani, and Andrii Telizhenko, who is part of "Derkach's inner circle" (Note: On 11 January 2021, United States Department of Treasury added additional sanctions against Andrii Derkach and also sanctioned the "former Ukrainian Government officials Konstantin Kulyk, Oleksandr Onyshchenko, Andriy Telizhenko, and current Ukraine Member of Parliament Oleksandr Dubinsky" as part of "Derkach's inner circle".) and a close associate of Rudy Giuliani, supported Michael Caputo, who was producer, and Sergey Petrushin, who is a Russian co-producer that lives in Miami and a close associate of Caputo for over 25 years, making the documentary film The Ukraine Hoax: Impeachment, Biden Cash, and Mass Murder with guest host Michael Caputo which aired on the One America News Network (OANN) on 21 January 2020 only two weeks before the Senate's acquittal of Donald Trump after his first impeachment trial.

In its August 2020 final report on the 2016 election interference, the bipartisan Senate Intelligence Committee characterized Kilimnik as a "Russian intelligence officer" who worked with Manafort while he was Trump campaign manager to deflect suspicions of interference away from Russia and onto Ukraine. The report mentions Kilimnik about 800 times, although most of the details about his intelligence connections were redacted. However, the sharing of intelligence with Kilimnik by Manafort and others "represented a grave counterintelligence threat". The committee acquired sufficient evidence to assert that Kilminik may have been involved directly in the plot, not only to hack the Democrats computers, but to pass on the information to WikiLeaks.

This effort became a major element of conspiracy theories related to the Trump–Ukraine scandal promoted by President Trump and his associates.

== Sanctions ==
In April 2021, the US Treasury Department sanctioned Kilimnik for providing Russian intelligence with "sensitive information on polling and campaign strategy" provided to him by Manafort from the Trump campaign, and for making the untrue claim that Ukraine, rather than Russia, had interfered in the 2016 election. A Treasury spokesman declined to relay further information to NBC News about the new intelligence on the issue. The Associated Press reported it was the first occasion the United States government had concluded a strong connection existed between the campaign of Donald Trump and Russian intelligence.

== Russian residence ==
Since at least August 2018, Kilimnik and his wife have been living in a $2 million home in a heavily guarded elite gated community in Khimki, north-west of the Moscow Region outside the Moscow Ring Road (MKAD). The area is the base of the Moscow unit of the GRU unit accused by Mueller in a July 2018 indictment of taking the lead in the hacking emails of the Democrats in 2016.
