= Michael Caputo =

Republican political strategist and lobbyist (born 1962)

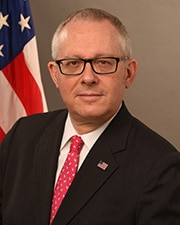

Assistant Secretary of Health and Human Services for Public Affairs
- In office April 16, 2020 – January 20, 2021
- President: Donald Trump
- Preceded by: Ryan Murphy (acting)
- Succeeded by: Mark Weber (acting)

Personal details
- Born: Michael Raymon Caputo; March 24, 1962 (age 64) Buffalo, New York, U.S.
- Party: Republican
- Education: University at Buffalo (BA) University of Pennsylvania (Juris Doctor Law Profile)

Michael Raymon Caputo (born March 24, 1962) is an American political strategist and lobbyist. He was assistant secretary of public affairs in the Department of Health and Human Services in the first Trump administration. He worked for the Reagan Administration with Oliver North, and was director of media services on the George H. W. Bush campaign in the 1992 United States presidential election. Caputo moved to Russia in 1994, after the dissolution of the Soviet Union, and was an adviser to Boris Yeltsin. He worked for Gazprom Media in 2000 where he worked on improving the image of Vladimir Putin in the U.S. He moved back to the U.S. and founded a public relations company, and then moved to Ukraine to work on a candidate's campaign for parliament.

Caputo was campaign manager for Carl Paladino's failed 2010 bid for Governor of New York. Caputo worked for the Donald Trump 2016 presidential campaign from November 2015 to June 2016, and was in charge of communications for New York. He left the campaign after publicly supporting the removal of campaign manager Corey Lewandowski. Caputo was investigated by the United States House Permanent Select Committee on Intelligence as part of its investigation into Russian interference in the 2016 US presidential election.

While working in a top position in the HHS for the Trump administration, Caputo sought to change, delay, suppress and retroactively edit scientific reports on COVID-19 by the Centers for Disease Control that were deemed unflattering to Trump or inconsistent with Trump's rhetoric, and has accused CDC scientists of sedition.

On September 14, 2020, Caputo posted a Facebook video in which he claimed that "there are hit squads being trained all over this country" to mount armed opposition to a second term for President Trump. He also stated "You understand that they're going to have to kill me, and unfortunately, I think that's where this is going." Two days later Caputo took a two-month medical leave. Caputo said of himself that his physical health was in question, and his "mental health has definitely failed." On September 24, it was announced that he had been diagnosed with squamous cell carcinoma that had spread from his throat to his neck and head.

== Early life and education ==
Caputo was born in 1962 in Buffalo, New York, where he spent the bulk of his early years in the region known as the Southtowns. Caputo's early public relations work was in Hawaii while with the United States Army, which he joined directly after finishing high school. In 1983, after leaving the Army, he enrolled at the University at Buffalo. Caputo received his J.D. degree from the University of Pennsylvania in 2013.

Caputo was employed by Republican politicians such as Congressman Jack Kemp. Caputo was mentored by Roger J. Stone Jr. in political advisement, and became his personal driver. He learned from Stone that political campaigns could be turned into wins for candidates if the public found them entertaining.

== Career ==
=== Reagan Administration and Bush campaign ===
During the Reagan Administration, Caputo helped support the president's agenda in Central America. He worked with Oliver North to foment propaganda as part of Reagan's public relations efforts in South America and in Central America. After his work for the Reagan Administration he served as assistant director of the House of Representatives Gallery of the Radio and Television Correspondents' Association. He next worked for President George H. W. Bush as director of media services in Bush's campaign in the 1992 United States presidential election.

=== Russian advisor and media consultant ===
After the dissolution of the Soviet Union in 1991, Caputo established residence in Russia in 1994. He served as an adviser to Boris Yeltsin in 1995. In his capacity as advisor to Yeltsin, he was employed with the United States Agency for International Development. He served as president of The Florence Group from 1994 to 1999, and stated he "played a pivotal role in electing Boris Yeltsin to his second term as President of the Russian Federation."

Caputo was employed by a Moscow-headquartered subsidiary of Gazprom, Gazprom-Media. He was contracted by Gazprom in 2000 to work for Russian leader Vladimir Putin. His task was to increase Putin's public relations standing, specifically his support level in the U.S. During his residence in Russia, he became a business partner and close friend of Sergey Petrushin on or about 1997. (Note: In March 2021, Caputo told Mother Jones that he had been a "business partner and friend for 25 years" of Sergey (Georgy) Petrushin, a Russian that lives in Miami and co-produced Caputo's documentary film The Ukraine Hoax: Impeachment, Biden Cash, and Mass Murder with guest host Michael Caputo which aired on January 21, 2020, on One America News Network only two weeks before the United States Senate acquittal of Donald Trump during his first impeachment trial. Others supporting Caputo and his co-producer Petrushin in this documentary film include Konstantin Kilimnik, who is a member of the Russian intelligence community and an associate of Paul Manafort who described Kilimnik as Manafort's "Russian Brain", Andrii Telizhenko, who is a close associate of Rudy Giuliani, and Andrii Derkach, who is a Russian intelligence agent that graduated from the FSB Academy.) He moved back from Russia to the U.S. late in 2000.

After returning to the U.S., Caputo was called by his former mentor Roger Stone, who convinced him to move to Miami Beach, Florida, and then Caputo founded his media advising company Michael Caputo Public Relations. Caputo moved back to Europe in 2007 while advising a politician's campaign for parliament in the 2007 Ukrainian parliamentary election.

=== Paladino campaign ===
Caputo worked as the campaign manager for real estate businessman Carl Paladino's unsuccessful campaign in the 2010 election for governor of New York state. During the campaign, Caputo was profiled by The New York Times, which described Caputo's "impish spirit and no-holds-barred campaign style" as a key factor helping Paladino, then a little-known figure, gain attention in seeking the Republican nomination for governor.

Paladino was supported at the time by the Tea Party movement, and in an interview with The New York Times, Caputo embraced the outsider nature of Paladino's bid: "This is a campaign of junkyard dogs, not pedigreed poodles. Carl knows the background of everyone who works for him. He knows that each of us comes to the campaign with warts. And he has his own warts. We don't hide anything."

Paladino explained his hiring choice of Caputo as campaign manager: "I'm facing some major demons here, and I needed someone who could go right back on top of them in a matter of minutes. You've got to let them know they are going to get punished."

=== Work for Donald Trump ===
Donald Trump hired Caputo in 2014 to launch an astroturfing campaign in support of his stalking-horse bid for the Buffalo Bills. Caputo established a shell organization named "12th Man Thunder" (later renamed "Bills Fan Thunder" after a trademark dispute with the Texas A&M Aggies football team) and hired a proxy leader, amputee Chuck Sonntag, whom Trump and Caputo calculated would garner sympathy. When Trump placed his bid and was disallowed ties to the organization, Caputo retaliated by engaging in a smear campaign against other bidders: Jon Bon Jovi and Maple Leaf Sports & Entertainment. The group's publicity efforts exacerbated an already-simmering anti-Toronto sentiment, but ultimately a competitor to both bids, Buffalo Sabres owner and natural gas tycoon Terrence Pegula and his wife Kim Pegula, prevailed and purchased the Bills franchise, significantly outbidding both Trump and Bon Jovi. Bills Fan Thunder remained in operation as a charity as of 2017.

In 2016, offices of Michael Caputo Public Relations were located in East Aurora, New York. Caputo also had staff located in Miami Beach, Florida, and Moscow, Russia. During the 2016 New York Republican primary, Caputo became a political adviser to Trump in order to help him win the primary in that state. At the time of his hiring he was employed as a commentator on a political talk program on WBEN AM radio. In order to support Trump in New York, he joined forces with his former employer from the 2010 gubernatorial race, Carl Paladino. While working on the Trump campaign, Caputo was placed in charge of communications for the candidate in New York.

Caputo was a senior adviser to Trump's political efforts from November 2015 to June 2016. On June 20, 2016, he was fired from the Trump campaign shortly after Corey Lewandowski was replaced as campaign manager by Paul Manafort. He had tweeted in support of Lewandowski's leaving; in his resignation letter to Manafort said he regretted the statement on Twitter.

=== Activities from 2016 to 2020 ===
After Trump's election, Caputo maintained contacts with associates in the Trump administration. After news reports of Donald Trump's disclosure of classified information to Russia in May 2017, Caputo told the Associated Press that leaks from within the Trump Administration were caused by "a coordinated, silent coup." Caputo told USA Today that he attributed the leaks to disaffected members of the Stop Trump movement, whom he called "anti-Trump zealots".

In 2019 and 2020, Caputo posted numerous sexually crude and sexist tweets directed at women.

In early 2020, Caputo posted multiple offensive and racist tweets about Chinese people; he deleted almost all of his past tweets before assuming a position at HHS.

In early 2020 during President Trump's impeachment, Caputo wrote a book called The Ukraine Hoax: How Decades of Corruption in the Former Soviet Republic Led to Trump's Phony Impeachment. He also produced and hosted a documentary by the same name which was aired on the pro-Trump television channel One America News.

=== Trump administration ===
In April 2020, despite Caputo having no medical or scientific background, he was appointed by the White House as assistant secretary of the Department of Health and Human Services for public affairs – in effect, the department's chief spokesperson.

Caputo and other political appointees on his team tried to change, delay, suppress and retroactively edit scientific reports on COVID-19 by the Centers for Disease Control that were deemed to contradict or undermine what Trump was saying publicly, according to a report by Politico in September 2020. Caputo personally confirmed the report, saying that his attempts to influence the content of Morbidity and Mortality Weekly Report (MMWR), the CDC's weekly report of information and recommendations regarding public health, had been going on for 3 1/2 months. He said it was because the MMWR reporting contained "political content" as well as scientific information, adding that the changes suggested by his office were "infrequently" accepted by CDC. Caputo appointed Canadian epidemiologist Dr. Paul Alexander as scientific advisor. Alexander tried unsuccessfully to get all issues of MMWR held up until he personally approved them. He tried to prevent CDC scientists from writing or saying that COVID-19 could be transmitted by children, which he said had "zero" data to support it, and would undermine Trump's goal of having children return to school. In reply, other scientists cited published studies of transmission in summer camps and households. Citing concerns about the political leanings of CDC scientists, Caputo delayed for a month the publication of a report on hydroxychloroquine as a treatment for COVID-19 that concluded "the potential benefits of these drugs do not outweigh their risks." In emails to the head of CDC, Alexander accused CDC scientists of attempting to "hurt the president" and writing "hit pieces on the administration". CDC resisted many of the changes, but increasingly allowed HHS personnel to review articles and suggest changes before publication. Emails obtained by The New York Times in September 2020 showed Caputo and Alexander working to discredit CDC scientists, notably principal deputy director Anne Schuchat, and to silence scientists speaking to the press, in an effort to depict a rosier outlook for the pandemic.

Caputo was the key figure in a planned HHS advertising campaign, funded with $300 million requisitioned from the CDC, which aimed to "defeat despair" about COVID-19 by airing video interviews between administration officials and celebrities. The campaign suffered numerous setbacks, including opposition from HHS officials regarding the aim of the campaign and a lack of interest from celebrities. Also, the company hired to film the interviews, which is headed by a business associate of Caputo's, had no experience with public health campaigns and struggled with the amount of work required to produce the videos. Senior House Democrats launched an investigation into a $250 million contract awarded to a market research firm, and questioned the political motivations behind airing such a campaign right before the 2020 presidential election. In a Facebook video on September 13, Caputo said that Trump had personally directed him to work on the campaign.

On September 13, 2020, Caputo asserted in a video on his personal Facebook page that CDC scientists were engaged in "sedition" with a "resistance unit" against Trump, and were "meeting in coffee shops" to plan their next attack on Trump. Caputo added that left-wing "hit squads being trained all over this country" were preparing an armed insurrection after the 2020 presidential election, advising his listeners to "buy ammunition". He claimed that the shooting of a right wing protester in Portland had been "a drill". He continued, "You understand that they're going to have to kill me, and unfortunately, I think that's where this is going." He later said his physical and mental health were deteriorating and he feared being alone, describing "shadows on the ceiling" in his apartment. On September 14, Caputo's hometown newspaper, The Buffalo News, released an editorial calling for his removal, "(...) What's lunacy is for paranoia and political calculations to be coloring the dissemination of scientific knowledge during a pandemic. Caputo's ideas about managing a health crisis need to be put out to pasture." On September 15, Caputo apologized to HHS staff and indicated he might soon be leaving the agency, possibly on medical leave, admitting "he had never read" one of the MMWRs. On September 16 he announced that he was taking a 60-day medical leave from his post "after consultation with President Trump and Secretary Azar." Alexander was also said to be leaving. Caputo never returned to work.

Two days after Alexander was ousted and Caputo went on leave, the CDC reversed its much-criticized statement saying that asymptomatic people who have been in close contact with a person infected with the coronavirus did not need to receive COVID-19 testing; the statement had been forced through at the direction of HHS leadership and the White House over the objections of scientists and without going through the usual CDC scientific review process.

== Investigation ==
Due to his time working on the Trump campaign and the fact that he previously worked for politicians in Russia, Caputo was contacted by the United States House Permanent Select Committee on Intelligence on May 9, 2017, as part of its investigation into Russian interference in the 2016 US presidential election. The House Intelligence Committee requested Caputo come in and be interviewed voluntarily and submit to the committee relevant documents associated with its investigation.

During a March 20, 2017, hearing, Representative Jackie Speier questioned FBI Director James Comey about Caputo, and cited employment with Gazprom and history in Ukraine. Caputo worked with the House Intelligence Committee to respond to queries. Posting to social media, Caputo denied ties to Russia while on the Trump campaign. Caputo told the House Intelligence Committee: "The only time the President and I talked about Russia was in 2013, when he simply asked me in passing what it was like to live there in the context of a dinner conversation."

In May 2016, Caputo and Roger Stone had met with Henry Greenberg (a.k.a. Henry Oknyansky or Henry Grinberg or Gennady Vostretsov or Gennady Arzhanik), a Russian national who claimed to have damaging information about Hillary Clinton. Caputo later denied contact with Russian officials or having discussed Russia with Trump or with other campaign aides. Caputo said in June 2017 that it was not until prosecutors informed him that Greenberg was Russian that he learned the man he had spoken with in 2016 was not a U.S. citizen.

Caputo hired attorney Dennis Vacco to represent him during the investigation, and subsequently stated that he had liquidated his children's college funds to pay Vacco.

In May 2026, Caputo said he was requesting $2.7 million in reimbursement from a $1.776 billion fund created by the second Trump administration for victims of alleged “lawfare”, saying that the "machinery of government was clearly weaponized against my family."

== Personal life ==
While working in Russia in the 1990s, Caputo met and married a Russian student studying astrophysics; their marriage ended in a divorce. Caputo became a Catholic in 2000, later saying this religious change helped him find peace. While advising in Kyiv, Ukraine, in 2007, Caputo met Maryna Ponomarenko, who became his second wife.

On September 24, 2020, a spokesman for Caputo's family announced that he had been diagnosed with metastatic head and neck cancer which originated in his throat.

== See also ==
- Vladimir Gusinsky
- Mikhail Lesin
- New York Republican primary, 2016
- The Plot to Hack America
- Timeline of Russian interference in the 2016 United States elections
- Timeline of post-election transition following Russian interference in the 2016 United States elections
- Timeline of investigations into Trump and Russia (January–June 2018)
- Donald Trump presidential campaign, 2016
