= Kostiantyn Kulyk =

Ukrainian former prosecutor

Kostiantyn Hennadiiovych Kulyk (Ukrainian: Костянтин Геннадійович Кулик, born 3 November 1977) is a Ukrainian former prosecutor who was involved in creating a dossier regarding the activities of Hunter Biden. According to the New York Times, Rudy Giuliani planned to meet Kulyk in Europe in 2019 to discuss allegations regarding the then-former U.S. Vice President Joe Biden.

Kulyk was dismissed from his job in 2019 by the new prosecutor-general Ruslan Riaboshapka, recently appointed by the Verkhovna Rada under Volodymyr Zelenskyy.

He has been indicted on several occasions by Ukrainian prosecutors on corruption charges. According to the Ukrainian news agency RBC-Ukraine, charges of illegal enrichment against him were dropped in April 2020. In 2021, the U.S. Treasury Department accused him of participation in disinformation operations associated with Andrii Derkach and targeted at the United States, and he was added to the U.S. government Specially Designated Nationals sanctions list. In November 2023, he was charged with treason by Ukrainian prosecutors.
