= Andrii Derkach =

Ukrainian politician and businessman (born 1967)

- Андрій Деркач (Ukrainian); Андрей Деркач (Russian)
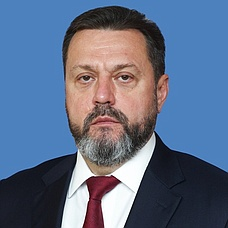

Federation Council Senator from Astrakhan Oblast on executive authority
- Incumbent
- Assumed office 12 September 2024
- Preceded by: Aleksandr Bashkin

Member of the Verkhovna Rada
- In office 12 May 1998 – 23 January 2023

Personal details
- Born: 19 August 1967 (age 59) Dnipropetrovsk, Ukrainian SSR, Soviet Union (now Dnipro, Ukraine)
- Party: United Russia
- Other political affiliations: Party of Regions (until 2014); Our Land (2020)
- Children: Tetyana Terekhova
- Parent: Leonid Derkach (father)
- Occupation: Businessman, politician

Andrii Leonidovych Derkach (Ukrainian: Андрій Леонідович Деркач; born 19 August 1967), also known as Andrei Leonidovich Derkach (Russian: Андрей Леонидович Деркач) is a Russian and former Ukrainian politician and businessman who had been a member of the Verkhovna Rada from 1998 to January 2023, serving seven terms, with several parties, and was stripped of Ukrainian citizenship.

In August 2020, U.S. counterintelligence chief William Evanina identified Derkach as a key participant in Russian efforts to harm Joe Biden's candidacy in the 2020 U.S. presidential election. United States intelligence community analysis released in March 2021 found that Derkach was among proxies of Russian intelligence who promoted and laundered misleading or unsubstantiated narratives about Biden "to US media organizations, US officials, and prominent US individuals, including some close to former President Trump and his administration." Trump's personal attorney Rudy Giuliani met with Derkach in December 2019.

In 2021, the United States Government accused Derkach of being a "Russian agent" and sanctioned him for interference in the 2020 United States elections, and the Ukrainian government sanctioned him for spreading Russian propaganda. In June 2022, the Security Service of Ukraine (SBU) said that Derkach received funds from the Russian GRU to create private security companies that Russia planned to use to capture Ukraine, and that Prosecutor General of Ukraine had started a pre-trial investigation into his role. In November 2023 Ukrainian police and prosecutors accused Derkach of treason.

Both Andrii and his father Leonid Derkach were close with the Kremlin-linked Ukrainian oligarch Vadim Rabinovich, and Crime bosses Semyon Mogilevich, and Alexander Angert, Leonid Minin, and Sergei Mikhailov. Derkach received Russian citizenship with connections to the Federal Security Service of the Russian Federation.

== Early life and education ==
Derkach was born on 19 August 1967 in Dnipropetrovsk, Ukrainian SSR, the son of KGB officer Leonid Derkach, who headed the State Customs Committee and later the Security Service of Ukraine intelligence agency from 1998 to 2003. Derkach was fired in 2001 for his alleged involvement in the murder of journalist Georgiy Gongadze. Ihor Smeshko, the head of Ukraine's SBU (Ukrainian: Служба безпеки України (СБУ)) from 2003 to 2005 who replaced Leonid Derkach, maintained a close relationship with the FBI and kept close watch on the Derkachs. In 2005, the report of an ad hoc committee formed via the Ukrainian parliament, primarily responsible for investigating the murder, concluded that Gongadze's murder had been organized; the primary conspirators remained identified as then-President Kuchma and his Minister of the Interior, in addition to Leonid Derkach, who, according to the committee, had been involved in the crime.

Derkach attended the Kharkiv Higher Military Command Engineering School, graduating in 1989. In 1989 and 1990, he served in the Strategic Missile Force at the technical missile base of the Pervomaysk division; this division was under the command of the Strategic Missile Force. In 1993, he graduated with a Ph.D. in law from the Dzerzhinsky Higher School of the KGB, (later renamed the FSB Academy), with a thesis titled "Organizing and Holding Meetings with Secret Agents".

== Career ==
In 1993, after graduation from the FSB Academy, Derkach worked as Security Officer at the Office of Security Service of Ukraine in the Dnipropetrovsk Oblast (province). The Derkach family was very close to Leonid Kuchma who worked side by side with Leonid Derkach producing R-36 ballistic missiles at the Yuzhmash factory, and, after Kuchma became president of Ukraine in 1994, the Derkachs gained political positions through their relationships with Kuchma. The Derkachs are part of the Dnipr Clan known as the Derkach group which maintains very close relationships with Oleg Deripaska, Mikhail Fridman's Moscow based Alfa Group and Petr Aven's Alfa-Bank. (Note: Of the Clan of Dnipropetrovsk, the Derkach group of Leonid and his son Andrii are close to the Leonid Kuchma group. The Viktor Pinchuk group is a rival of the Derkach group. The Yulia Timoshenko group is a rival of the Kuchma group. The fifth group is the Privatbank group.)

From 1994 to 1996, he served as deputy director of the Control Service of the President of Ukraine. From 1996 to 1997 he was Advisor to the President of Ukraine on Foreign Economic Affairs. In 1997 and 1998 he was First Assistant to the Prime Minister of Ukraine. Derkach served as President of the national nuclear generating company Energoatom from 2006 to 2007. He served as Director General of the State Concern "Ukratomprom" in 2007. From 2011 to 2013, he served pro bono as Chief Advisor to then Prime Minister of Ukraine Mykola Azarov. Despite no longer having an official role, Derkach remains involved in the management of Energoatom, making strategic decisions alongside Oleg Boyarintsev and Herman Galushchenko.

In 2003, both Andrii and Leonid Derkach were implicated in numerous illegal weapons transfers to the Balkans, Asia and Africa including to Iraq, the Taliban, al-Qaeda, al-Shabaab, and Liberia. Derkach was implicated in the government's orchestration of the Euromaidan assault by security forces on peaceful demonstrators in Kyiv on 11 December 2013.

=== Business holdings and interests ===
Germany's Federal Agency for Civic Education reported in 2007 that Derkach and his father Leonid led The Derkach Group, one of the regional cross-industry holding companies formed in Ukraine following the collapse of the Soviet Union. The Derkach Group had close ties to the political elite and attempted to influence politics through lobbying, corrupt networks, and illegal appropriations. Derkach also headed a media company the "Ukrainian Press Group" (Ukrainian: "Українська прес-група") consisting of four newspapers, a TV guide, and the website версії.com.

According to Media Ownership Monitor Ukraine, Derkach "de facto owns" television channel TRK Era and Radio Era; officially the owner is his assistant Anton Oleksandrovych Simonenko while Derkach is listed as honorary president of Era-Media and head of the arts council of TRK Еra. Ownership data of the privately held company is not publicly available. Radio Era was one of several radio stations, most prominently among them Petro Poroshenko's Channel 5, that provided around-the-clock reporting from Maidan Nezalezhnosti during the Orange Revolution in 2004.

According to anti-corruption watchdog organization Chesno, Derkach and his associates illegally appropriated 42 hectares of protected lands valued at tens of millions of dollars. Derkach also failed to declare his wife's stake in various of his business enterprises, as he was obliged to do under the Ukrainian law to prevent corruption.

As of 2010 Derkach often lobbied for Oleg Deripaska's Russia company Rusal (formerly Russkiy alyuminiy) and has had ties to Anatoly Chubais and Chubais' monopolistic electricity supplier, RAO UES.

=== Parliamentary activity ===
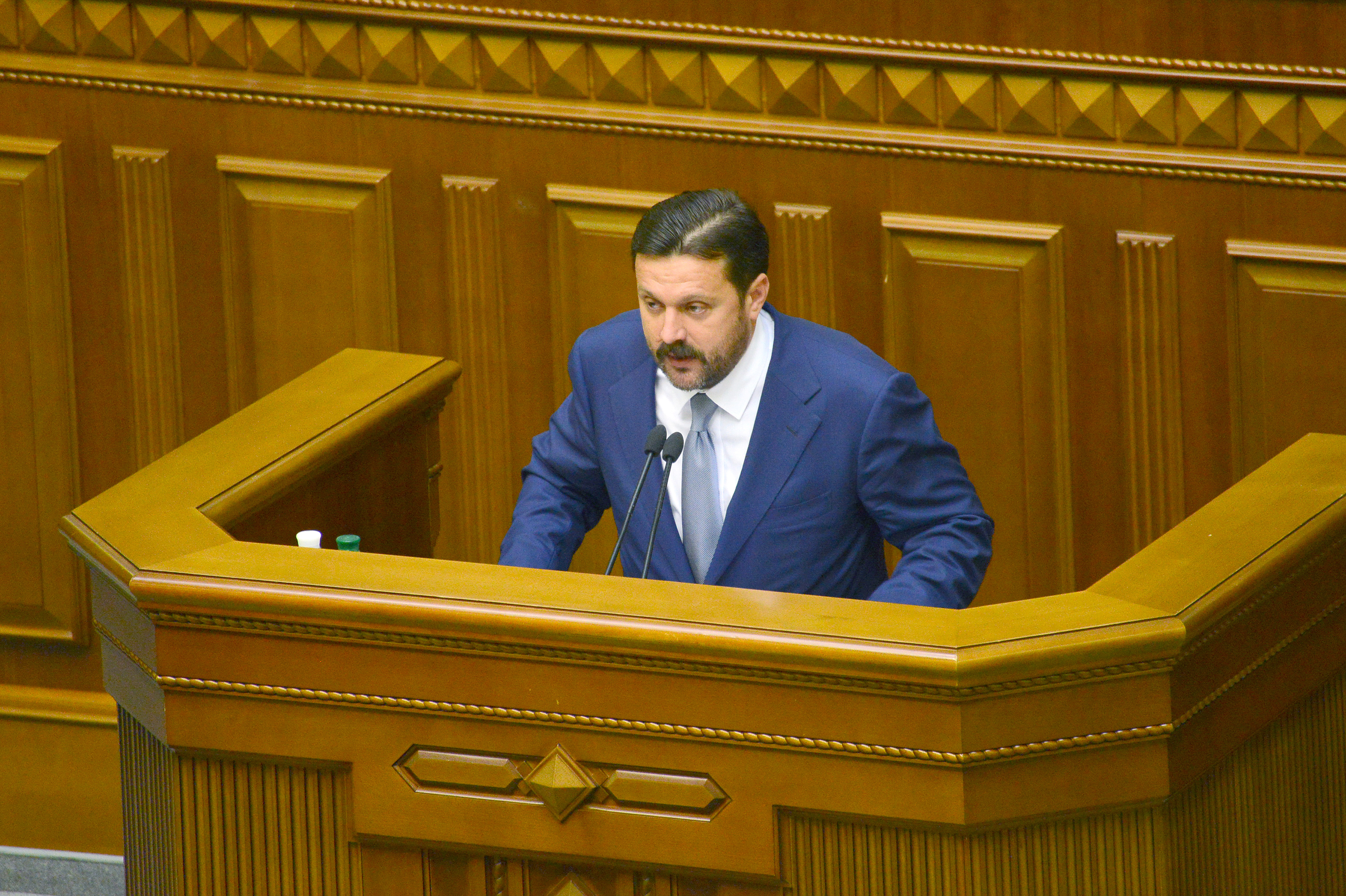
Derkach in 2013

Derkach has been a member of the Ukrainian Parliament, the Verkhovna Rada, from 1998 until 2020. He was first elected in the 1998 Ukrainian parliamentary election in District 159 (at the same time he ran for Laborious Ukraine Electoral Bloc which did not win any seats). In parliament he joins the Labour Ukraine faction.

In the 2002 Ukrainian parliamentary election Derkach was elected as No.11 in the election list of For United Ukraine!. In June 2002 however he joined the re-created Labour Ukraine faction.

From 2002 to 2006, he served as Deputy Chairman of the Verkhovna Rada Committee on Fuel and Energy Complex, Nuclear Policy and Nuclear Safety.

Derkach returned to parliament in the 2006 Ukrainian parliamentary election by being No.9 on the election list of Socialist Party of Ukraine.

In the 2007 Ukrainian parliamentary election Derkach was elected on the party list of the Party of Regions; No.96 on the list.

In 2012 he was re-elected into the Verkhovna Rada as a candidate of the Party of Regions in electoral districts (first-past-the-post electoral system) 159. Derkach won the district with 63.37% of the votes. In 2012 he became been a member of the Budget Committee of the Ukrainian Parliament (Committee of the Verkhovna Rada on issues of budget). He left the faction of Party of Regions on 21 February 2014.

In 2014 Derkach was re-elected into parliament as an independent candidate again in District 159. He won the district with 61.85% of the votes.

From 2014 to 2016, he was Deputy Chairman of the Parliamentary Group "Nation's Will".

According to Ukrainian anti-corruption watchdog organization Chesno, Derkach voted for the "dictatorship laws", ten laws restricting freedom of speech and assembly, which were signed into law by president Viktor Yanukovych in January 2014; nine of them were repealed by the Verkhovna Rada 12 days later.

As of October 2019, Derkach represents District 159 situated around Hlukhiv in the Sumy Oblast in northeastern Ukraine. In the 2019 Ukrainian parliamentary election he won the district with 40.65% of the votes. Following the election he did not become a member of any parliamentary committee.

In the Sumy Oblast 2020 local election Derkach headed the list for the Sumy Oblast Council for Our Land. Although the party won 8 seats in the election, Derkach did not take his seat in this provincial council.

On 20 August 2021 the National Security and Defense Council of Ukraine imposed personal economic restrictive sanctions against Derkach on the grounds he was a "pro-Russian propagandist".

On 10 January 2023, Derkach was stripped of his Ukrainian citizenship along with his associates Viktor Medvedchuk and Taras Kozak.

On 13 January 2023, a constitutional majority of members of the Verkhovna Rada voted to strip Derkach of his position as a people's deputy.

On 12 September 2024, Derkach was appointed as a member of the Federation Council of Russia, representing Astrakhan Oblast. He was selected to the position by the regional governor, Igor Babushkin.

=== Interference in United States 2020 elections ===
Cover: Report of the Select Committee on Intelligence United States Senate on Russian Active Measures Campaigns and Interference in the 2016 U. S. Election, Volume 5 - Counterintelligence Threats and Vulnerabilities

==== Money laundering allegations ====
On 9 October 2019, Derkach alleged that Joe Biden had been involved in an international money laundering scheme with Ukrainian energy company Burisma Holdings and US-based Rosemont Seneca Partners. He claimed that Burisma's payments to four of its board members–including Biden's son Hunter–which were neither secret nor illegal, were "a sinister plot involving" Ukraine's former president Poroshenko but his claims initially were mostly ignored in Ukraine and abroad. Anders Åslund, senior fellow at the Atlantic Council, itself a member of the pro-NATO Atlantic Treaty Association, called Derkach "not credible" and a "professional disinformer".

==== Meeting with Giuliani ====
On 5 December 2019, Derkach met with President Donald Trump's personal lawyer Rudy Giuliani in Kyiv to put together a corruption case against Joe Biden and his son to damage Biden's presidential campaign, according to Derkach. In May 2020, he released a portion of a phone call between Joe Biden and Petro Poroshenko, the former president of Ukraine.

==== Documentary: The Ukraine Hoax: Impeachment, Biden Cash, and Mass Murder with guest host Michael Caputo ====
Derkach, Konstantin Kilimnik, who is a member of the Russian intelligence community and an associate of Paul Manafort who described Kilimnik as Manafort's "Russian Brain", and Andrii Telizhenko, who is a close associate of Rudy Giuliani, supported Michael Caputo, who was producer, and Sergey Petrushin, who is a Russian co-producer that lives in Miami and a close associate of Caputo for over 25 years, making the documentary film The Ukraine Hoax: Impeachment, Biden Cash, and Mass Murder with guest host Michael Caputo which aired on the One America News Network (OANN) on 21 January 2020 only two weeks before the Senate's acquittal of Donald Trump after his first impeachment trial.

==== Summer 2020 Senate hearings ====
During the summer of 2020, the United States Senate Committee on Homeland Security and Governmental Affairs, which was chaired by Ron Johnson, held hearings into the relationships among Burisma, Mykola Zlochevsky, and the Bidens. Blue Star Strategies is a public relations firm that had worked for Burisma. A contractor with Blue Star Strategies, (Note: Sally Painter is a lobbyist for her firm Blue Star Strategies. Painter had worked at the notorious Parex Bank, which was allegedly very closely associated with very large money laundering for Vladimir Putin, Yuri Chaika, and Russian Mafia including the Tambovskaya Organized Crime Group according to Spanish prosecutors. In 2017, Painter allegedly intermediated a secret payment from Latvia to Anders Aslund, who was on the Atlantic Council, for him to write an article which stated that ABLV Bank in Latvia had not been involved in money laundering.) Andrii Telizhenko (Ukrainian: Андрій Теліженко) was likely to be subpoenaed for testimony during the United States Senate investigations but the Republican plan involving his testimony was cancelled just before he would have testified to the Senate because of his ties to Andrii Derkach.

==== U.S. sanctions and investigations ====
On 10 September 2020, the U.S. Treasury Department sanctioned Derkach "for attempting to influence the U.S. electoral process," while also alleging that Derkach "ha[d] been an active Russian agent for over a decade, maintaining close connections with the Russian Intelligence Services." The sanctions include freezing all of Derkach's property interests subject to U.S. jurisdiction and prohibiting U.S. persons from engaging in transactions with him and with entities of which Derkach owns 50 percent or more. On January 11, 2021, the Treasury Department sanctioned Derkach associates with Treasury secretary Steven Mnuchin saying in a statement, "Russian disinformation campaigns targeting American citizens are a threat to our democracy. The United States will continue to aggressively defend the integrity of our election systems and processes." The January 2021 sanctions also sanctioned the "former Ukrainian Government officials Konstantin Kulyk, Oleksandr Onyshchenko, Andriy Telizhenko, and current Ukraine Member of Parliament Oleksandr Dubinsky" as part of "Derkach's inner circle". In May 2021 Facebook took a Ukrainian influence-for-hire network offline which included Derkach.

In April 2021, Forensic News reported that Derkach came under the scrutiny of prosecutors investigating Russian interference in the presidential election in 2020. In May 2021 the New York Times confirmed that prosecutors investigated whether Derkach and other Ukrainians "helped orchestrate a wide-ranging plan to meddle in the 2020 presidential campaign, including using Rudolph W. Giuliani to spread their misleading claims about President Biden and tilt the election in Donald J. Trump's favor."

==== Legal action in Ukraine ====
In June 2022, the Security Service of Ukraine (SBU) said that Derkach received funds from the Russian GRU to create private security companies that Russia planned to use to capture Ukraine, and that Prosecutor General of Ukraine had started a pre-trial investigation into his role. In November 2023 Ukrainian police and prosecutors accused Derkach of treason, membership in a criminal network including Oleksandr Dubinsky, nicknamed "Buratino" (Pinocchio) and Kostyantyn Kulyk, nicknamed "Ptychka" (Little Bird), created by the deputy head of the Russian GRU, Vladimir Alekseev.

On July 13, 2026, Ukraine's High Anti-Corruption Court (HACC) convicted former Verkhovna Rada lawmaker Andrii Derkach, who has fled to Russia and now sits as a senator in its Federal Assembly.

== Personal life ==
From 2010 to 2013 Derkach was a member of the Inter-Council Presence of the Russian Orthodox Church.

In the fall of 2020, Derkach was president of the 18th Pokrov International Orthodox Film Festival, which promoted peace and friendship with Russia.

In February 2021, he wrote a letter to Ecumenical Patriarch Bartholomew asking him not to come to Ukraine with a "plan of aggression" for the 30th anniversary of Ukrainian independence. Patriarch Warfield's visit to Ukraine did take place. In addition, in the letter, Derkach asked Patriarch Bartholomew to take part in the new "Amman" and only then go to Ukraine with a "road map".

Derkach fled Ukraine after Russia's invasion in 2022. Derkach was awarded the title of Hero of the Russian Federation from Russian president Vladimir Putin on 9 December 2025, the Heroes of the Fatherland Day, in a ceremony at the Kremlin.

== Honors and recognition ==
- Commander of the Order of Merit of the Italian Republic
- Hero of the Russian Federation

== See also ==
- False or misleading statements by Donald Trump
- Trump–Ukraine scandal
