= Paul E. Alexander =

Canadian health researcher

- Occupation: Health researcher

Academic background
- Education: McMaster University
- Thesis: Clinical practice and public health guidelines: The making of appropriate strong recommendations when the confidence in effect estimates is low (2015)
- Doctoral advisor: Gordon Guyatt

Academic work
- Discipline: Health research

Paul Elias Alexander is a Canadian independent scientist, and a former Trump administration official at the U.S. Department of Health and Human Services (HHS) during the COVID-19 pandemic. Alexander was recruited from his part-time, unpaid position at McMaster University to serve as an aide to HHS assistant secretary for public affairs Michael Caputo in March 2020. In that role, Alexander pressured federal scientists and public health agencies to suppress and edit their COVID-19 analyses to make them consistent with Trump's rhetoric.

Within the Trump Administration, Alexander advocated for a strategy of mass infection of the public with COVID-19 to build herd immunity. He sought to muzzle federal scientists and public health agencies to prevent them from contradicting the Trump Administration's political talking points.

== Education ==
Alexander has a bachelor's degree in epidemiology from McMaster University in Hamilton, Ontario, and a master's degree from Oxford University. In 2015 he earned a PhD degree from McMaster University's Department of Health Research Methods, Evidence, and Impact.

== Career ==
Alexander had a contract role as a part-time, unpaid assistant professor at McMaster, a post "given to scholars working primarily outside the university." He was not employed by the university at the time he worked in the Trump administration. From 2017 until December 2019, Alexander was employed by the Washington, D.C.–based Infectious Diseases Society of America (IDSA), where he specialized in systematic reviews. At IDSA, Alexander worked on several clinical practice guidelines.

== Advisor to Trump administration HHS official ==
In late March 2020, Alexander was recruited as scientific advisor by Michael Caputo, the newly appointed assistant secretary for public affairs at the United States Department of Health and Human Services (HHS). The two had become friends when Caputo hosted a talk radio show on which Alexander often appeared to talk about scientific and pseudo-scientific subjects. Caputo, who has no scientific background, said in an interview that President Donald Trump had told him to "bring expertise" to his new position and that "the first call I made after I got off the phone with the president" was to offer Alexander a job.

=== Coronavirus pandemic and CDC reports ===
Alexander and Caputo came under scrutiny for their months-long efforts to exert control over the public messaging of scientists and health officials regarding the coronavirus pandemic in the United States, in particular for efforts to influence, distort and obfuscate the public messaging of the Centers for Disease Control (CDC) so that it would be more compatible with Trump's public statements. Alexander's efforts were focused on the CDC's widely read Morbidity and Mortality Weekly Report (MMWR), which Caputo and Alexander regarded as containing "political content"; Alexander tried unsuccessfully to get all issues of MMWR held up until personally approved by him.

Emails written by Alexander and Caputo detailed an attempt to silence career CDC scientists and question their findings as part of what current and former CDC officials called a "campaign of bullying and intimidation" that stretched for five months. After Dr. Anne Schuchat, the principal deputy director of the CDC, who worked at the agency for 32 years, gave an interview to the Journal of the American Medical Association in which she urged the use of face masks to prevent the spread of the virus, Alexander emailed Caputo calling Schuchat "duplicitous" and claimed, "Her aim is to embarrass the president." On June 20, 2020, Alexander sent a message to CDC Director Robert R. Redfield, criticizing a CDC report about risks to pregnant women from COVID-19. Alexander said that the report, whose limitations the CDC had acknowledged, would "frighten women" and give the impression that "the President and his administration can't fix this and it is getting worse". He said that in his "opinion and sense" the CDC was "undermining the president by what they put out". A congressional committee has asked him to testify in September to give information about his interactions with CDC. On August 8, 2020, Alexander wrote to Redfield that "CDC to me appears to be writing hit pieces on the administration"; he asked Redfield to change reports that had already been published and demanded that he be allowed to review and edit MMWR before publication.

In August and early September 2020, Alexander sent several messages to press officers at the National Institutes of Health attempting to direct Dr. Anthony Fauci's media comments. In an August 2020 email to HHS officials, Alexander claimed that Fauci was "scaring the nation wrongfully." Alexander demanded, among other things, that Fauci should refrain from promoting the wearing of masks by children in school and COVID-19 testing of children. Fauci later said that he had not received the messages and would not have been influenced by them if he had. In emails in September 2020, Alexander celebrated two instances in which he said CDC officials had bowed to his pressure to water down information in CDC reports. Two days later, he asked Scott Atlas, then an advisor to the Trump White House, to assist him in disputing a CDC report on COVID-19 deaths; Atlas, Alexander, and others wrote a number of op-eds to counter warnings from federal scientists. Caputo and Alexander also strategized on how to underplay the virus and push for a rapid end to COVID-19-related restrictions on business. The emails were later obtained by the House Select Oversight Subcommittee on the Coronavirus Crisis.

In a Facebook Live video posted on his personal website on September 14, 2020, Caputo promoted a variety of unfounded accusations and conspiracy theories, including the idea that the CDC harbored a "resistance unit" to undermine Trump; Caputo also accused various scientists of "sedition" and "rotten science". In the same video, Caputo called Alexander a "genius" and defended his actions. Two days later, HHS announced that Caputo would take a 60-day medical leave of absence from HHS, and that Alexander would permanently leave the department. At a Senate hearing the same day, Redfield said he was "deeply saddened" by Caputo's claims, said they are "not true", and said that "The scientific integrity of the MMWR has not been compromised, and will not be compromised on my watch."

McMaster University distanced itself from Alexander, saying, "As a consultant, he is not speaking on behalf of McMaster University or the Department of Health Research Methods, Evidence, and Impact."

In an interview with the Toronto Globe and Mail after his departure from HHS, Alexander defended his actions, stating that he had wanted the CDC to make their reports "more upbeat so that people would feel more confident going out and spending money", and that he "did not think agencies should contradict any president's policy". Alexander also asserted that he was better suited than CDC scientists to assess data, saying: "None of those people have my skills. I make the judgment whether this is crap."

== Activities after leaving the Trump administration ==
After leaving HHS Alexander became an "independent academic scientist and COVID-19 consultant researcher", according to his website. He was a participant in the Freedom Convoy 2022 protest against vaccine mandates in Ottawa. He was a "board advisor" for "Taking Back our Freedoms", a Canadian group whose stated goal was "to bring a quick end to the so-called ‘C-19 health emergencies’ along with their unlawful ‘mandates’". In November 2022 Alexander was invited to advise the Alberta government by Premier Danielle Smith.

In 2022 Skyhorse Publishing published Presidential Takedown: How Anthony Fauci, the CDC, the NIH and the WHO conspired to overthrow President Trump, by Alexander and co-author Kent Heckenlively. The book was promoted as an "explosive behind-the-scenes look at Donald Trump's final months in office and how the COVID crisis response was a carefully crafted plan to ruin him". The book also alleges that there was a "personal vendetta of the CDC and HHS against Alexander himself".

In 2022 Alexander became an advisor to The Wellness Company, a dietary supplement and telemedicine company owned and managed by prominent COVID-19 disinformation promulgator Peter McCullough. The Wellness Company sells various kits (and subscriptions) with names like, "COVID Emergency Kit," supplying unregulated supplements and disproven treatments.

Alexander's newsletter, with about 40,000 subscribers, promotes right-wing talking points and medical disinformation, often recommending use of Wellness Company products.
