= Sumy Oblast Council =

Legislature of Sumy Oblast, Ukraine

Type
- Type: Unicameral
- Houses: 1

Leadership
- Speaker: Viktor Fedorchenko

Structure
- Seats: 64
- Political groups: 16 Servant of the People; 14 Opposition Platform — For Life; 10 Fatherland; 9 European Solidarity; 8 Our Land; 7 For the Future

Elections
- Last election: 25 October 2020

Meeting place
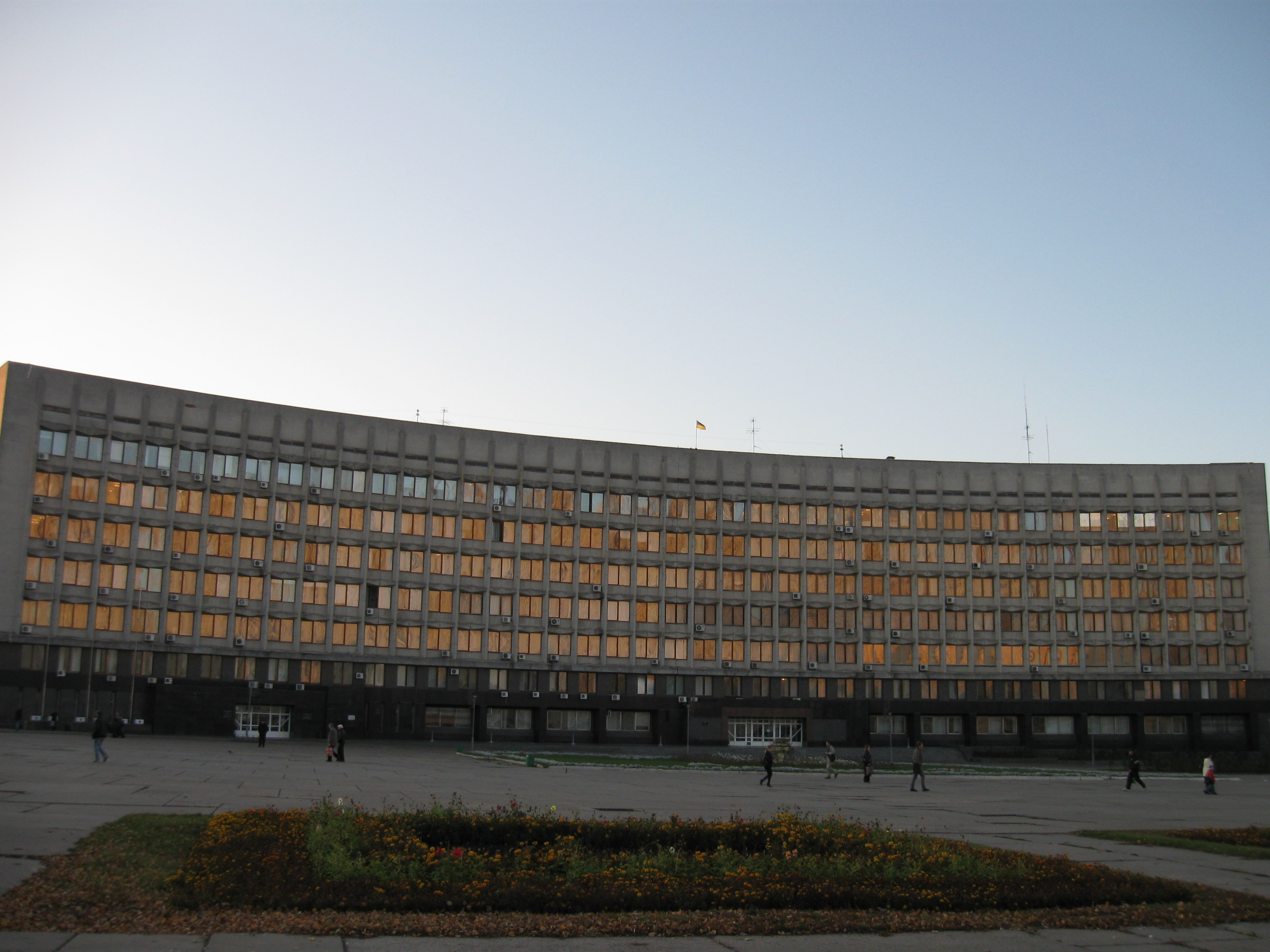
- Sumy, Sumy Oblast

Website
- https://sorada.gov.ua/

The Sumy Oblast Council (Ukrainian: Сумська обласна рада) is the regional oblast council (parliament) of the Sumy Oblast (province) located in central Ukraine.

Council members are elected for five year terms. In order to gain representation in the council, a party must gain more than 5 percent of the total vote.

As of August 2025, the coalition includes "Servant of the People" (16 deputies), "Batkivshchyna" (10 deputies), "European Solidarity" (9 deputies). The opposition includes 29 deputies: 14 non-factional deputies, "Our Land" (8 deputies), "For the Future" (7 deputies).

== Recent elections ==
=== 2020 ===
Distribution of seats after the 2020 Ukrainian local elections

- 16 Servant of the People
- 14 Opposition Platform — For Life
- 10 Fatherland
- 9 European Solidarity
- 8 Our Land
- 7 For the Future

Election date was 25 October 2020

=== 2015 ===
Distribution of seats after the 2015 Ukrainian local elections

- 14 Solidarity
- 14 Fatherland
- 8 Revival
- 7 Radical Party
- 6 People's Will
- 5 UKROP
- 5 Opposition Bloc
- 5 Svoboda

Election date was 25 October 2015

== Chairmen ==
=== Regional executive committee ===
- Iosif Gorlov (1939–1941, 1943–1944)
- Alexander Abramov (1944–1948)
- Vasily Shadrin (1948–1950)
- Ivan Martynenko (1950–1953)
- Andrei Kondratenko (1953–1959)
- Trofim Poplevkin (1959–1962)
- Boris Voltovsky (1962–1963)
- Ivan Eremenko (1963–1964; agrarian)
- Mikhail Lushpa (1963–1964; industrial)
- Andrey Naumenko (1964–1973)
- Dmitry Kozenyashev (1973–1982)
- Vladimir Shevchenko (1982–1988)
- Anatoly Bondarenko (1988–1991)
- Volodymyr Shevchenko (1991)

=== Regional council ===
- Volodymyr Shevchenko (1990–1991)
- Anatoliy Bondarenko (1991–1994)
- Anatoliy Epifanov (1994–1999)
- Mark Berfman (1999–2006)
- Vyacheslav Shaposhnyk (2006–2009)
- Volodymyr Tokar (2009–2010)
- Hennadiy Mykhailenko (2010–2014)
- Mykola Klochko (2014)
- Vera Lavryk (acting, 2014–2015)
- Semen Salatenko (2015–2016)
- Volodymyr Tokar (2016–2020)
- Viktor Fedorchenko (since 2020)
