= Oleksandr Dubinsky =

Ukrainian politician and former journalist

- Олександр Дубінський
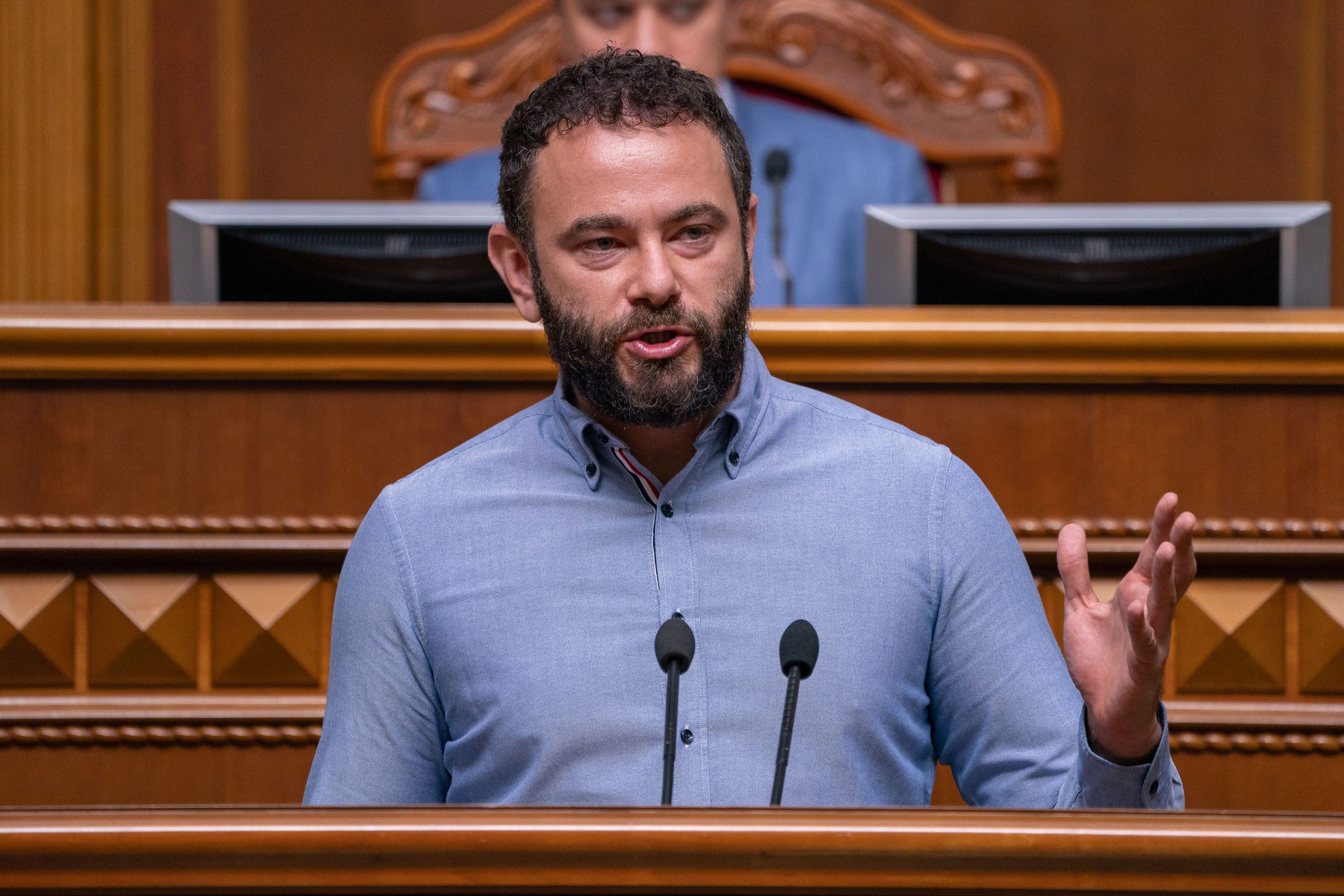
- Dubinsky in 2019

People's Deputy of Ukraine
- Incumbent
- Assumed office 29 August 2019
- Preceded by: Viktor Romaniuk
- Constituency: Kyiv Oblast, No. 94

Personal details
- Born: 18 April 1981 (age 45) Kiev, Ukrainian SSR, Soviet Union (now Kyiv, Ukraine)
- Party: Independent (2021–present)
- Other political affiliations: Servant of the People (2019–2021)
- Education: National University of Food Technologies; Igor Sikorsky Kyiv Polytechnic Institute
- Website: https://dubinsky.ua/

Oleksandr Anatoliiovych Dubinsky (Ukrainian: Олекса́ндр Анато́лійович Дубі́нський; born 18 April 1981) is a Ukrainian politician, former journalist and blogger, who served as Servant of the People faction member of the Verkhovna Rada since 2019 till 2021. He was also a presenter of the "Money" TV show on the 1+1 channel.

Dubinsky was initially a member of President Volodymyr Zelenskyy's Servant of the People party, and was elected Deputy Chair of the Committee on Finance, Tax and Customs Policy. Dubinsky's and his party's ties to Ukrainian oligarch Ihor Kolomoisky have come under media scrutiny, as have his opposition to the more radical elements of Ukrainian nationalism.

In January 2021, an investigation was opened into Dubinsky for tax evasion and obtaining property in an illegal manner. He was subsequently expelled from his party. A separate investigation was opened in August 2023, with him being accused of travelling to Spain for a holiday under false pretences amidst the war in his country. In November 2023, Dubinsky was detained and charged with treason, being accused of "operating at the behest of Russian intelligence when they aligned with efforts by (former US President Donald Trump's lawyer) Rudolph W. Giuliani to tie the (incumbent US President Joe) Biden('s) family to corruption in Ukraine". Dubinski has denied the charges against him, and has described the investigations as politically-motivated.

On February 27, 2025, the New York Times reported that Dubinsky is now “a former member of the Ukrainian Parliament,” who “has produced videos promoting what he calls a pro-Trump and pro-peace agenda from prison, where is he serving time for treason.”

== Early life and education ==
Dubinsky was born on 18 April 1981 in Kyiv. He studied at the 187th school in Kyiv and later graduated from the National University of Food Technologies, majoring in accounting and auditing, and the Kyiv Polytechnic Institute as an electrical engineer.

== Journalistic career ==
From 2004 to 2009 he worked at the Economic News newspaper ("Ekonomichni vidomosti" in Ukrainian) as an economic journalist. From May 2009 to May 2010 he worked as editor-in-chief of Weekly.ua. Since 2009 he has been blogging on Ukrayinska Pravda. At some point, Ukrayinska Pravda's editorial staff began to warn that the journalist was biased. Dubinsky's last blog post on Ukrayinska Pravda was published in late-2015.

In 2010, he became a producer for the Journalistic Investigations Department on 1+1 TV channel. In 2014, he was the host of the "Money" show. Since 2012, Dubinsky has directed the program Ukrainsky Sensatsii (literally Ukrainian Scoops) since its launch on 1+1. He also served as the show's producer, as well as that of the Secret Materials show on 1+1.

In April 2017, he launched his personal blog site Dubinsky.Pro. Since May 2017, he has been actively blogging on YouTube.

== Political career ==
According to Media Detector, when Oleksandr Dubinsky started working as the head of the Journalistic Investigations department in 2010, he became a clear and consistent advocate of 1+1 channel's owner Ihor Kolomoisky. For instance, some productions of Ukrainsky Sensatsii have signs of political put-up job, particularly the edition of 23 March 2019 called "50 Shades of Poroshenko" where then President of Ukraine Petro Poroshenko was accused of creating a criminal group in Moldova and involvement in the murder of his brother Mykhailo. Solomiia Vitvitska, a journalist at 1+1, called such investigations "strange" and assured that the TSN studio is not related to them.

During the 2019 presidential election, Dubinsky released a lot of critical materials about Poroshenko and only one about Yulia Tymoshenko. At the same time, he devoted positive coverage to Volodymyr Zelenskyy. In the 2019 Ukrainian parliamentary election he ran in constituency 94 located in Kyiv Oblast (Vasylkiv and Obukhiv cities, Vasylkiv and Obukhiv raions) representing Zelenskyy's Servant of the People party as a political neophyte. The Vidsich (Response) movement opposed Dubinsky within the Red Lines campaign. He won the election with 40.95% of the votes cast and became a People's Deputy of the Verkhovna Rada of the 9th convocation. Member of the "Servant of the People" party.

At the end of 2019, Dubinsky, who is considered to lead "Kolomoyskyi's influence group in the Ukrainian parliament" and who, on assignment of the oligarch, "joined the public campaign ... aimed at shifting responsibility for interfering in the 2016 US elections from Russia to Ukraine" met with Rudy Giuliani, who was looking for compromising material on Joe Biden.

In the October 2020 Ukrainian local elections Dubinsky headed the Servant of the People electoral list for deputies of the Kyiv Oblast Council. Although the party won 22 seats he did not take up his mandate. He was the deputy chairman of the Verkhovna Rada Committee on Finance, Tax and Customs Policy.

In May 2020, fellow People's Deputy Andrii Derkach had released audio recordings which claimed to disclose the influence of former U.S. Vice President Joe Biden on former President Poroshenko. On 11 January 2021 the U.S. Department of the Treasury's Office of Foreign Assets Control put Dubinsky on its sanction list for being part of a "Russia-linked foreign influence network" associated with fellow People's Deputy Andrii Derkach and alleged interfering in the 2020 United States presidential election. On 19 January 2021 the Prosecutor General of Ukraine opened a criminal case against Dubinsky regarding the legalization of criminally obtained property and non-payment of taxes according to a statement filed by Ukraine's Anti-Corruption Action Center. On 1 February 2021 Dubinsky was expelled from the Servant of the People's parliamentary faction.

On 14 March 2021 Dubinsky was removed as chairman of the Servant of the People Kyiv regional organization. The next day he was expelled from the party due to "violating the statute and disobeying the party's governing bodies."

On 3 August 2023, Dubinsky was placed under investigation by the Security Service of Ukraine for allegedly going on holiday in Spain under false pretenses despite travel restrictions imposed on politicians and civil servants following the Russian invasion of Ukraine. On November 14, 2023 Dubinsky was arrested and detained in a Ukrainian jail prior to trial for treason, "accused of operating at the behest of Russian intelligence when they aligned with efforts by Rudolph W. Giuliani to tie the Biden family to corruption in Ukraine". Also accused were Andriy Derkach, and Kostyantyn Kulyk, a former Ukrainian deputy prosecutor general, members of a spy network of GRU (Russian Federation) inside the Ukrainian government.

== Controversies ==
On 29 January 2019, representatives of the Petro Poroshenko Bloc gathered at the forum "From Kruty to Brussels. We are following our own way" which took place in Kyiv, after which then-president Petro Poroshenko announced his decision to run for a second term. Dubinsky posted on Facebook about this: "Poroshenko's forum today was our chance. Chance to use gas. Just everyone was there". He deleted the post later following an uproar. On 1 February, during the live broadcast of the talk show People Are Against It on ZIK TV channel, five guests left Oleksandr Dubinsky's studio over his post.

On 2–3 May 2019, Dubinsky's dubinsky.pro website posted information on the introduction of a fee for placing electronic records on the Health Ministry's website about passing medical examinations, as well as budgetary funds for the training of health care workers, which were allegedly directed for a project implemented by the NGO "Patriot Protection". The Ministry called these reports untrue, noting that Dubinsky used a fake document in his materials. Acting Health Minister Ulana Suprun then filed a lawsuit against him for the protection of honour, dignity and business reputation. On 8 November 2019, the Solomianskiy District Court of Kyiv dismissed Suprun's claim.

In June 2019, Dubinsky, as an announcer on 1+1, shot a controversial video after Kolomoyskyi's attempted takeover of the Ukrainian low-cost airline carrier SkyUp with the help of the Baryshivskyi District Court of Kyiv Oblast. He said that low-cost airlines were "cattle cars" and expressed support for the decision against SkyUp.

In June 2019, a video in which Dubinsky said the motto "Glory to Ukraine!" was Nazi went viral, he also mentioned the legalization of this motto in the modern Ukrainian army was "absurd and lunatic".

In August 2019, shortly after being elected, Dubinsky defended Israeli Prime Minister Benjamin Netanyahu's wife Sara after she threw bread on the floor at Boryspil airport, saying in the past five years the former authorities had glorified Nazi collaborators.

After top managers of the National Bank of Ukraine (NBU) had filed a lawsuit against Dubinsky on 29 November 2019, he posted expletive messages against the NBU management on social media and publicly accused its past and present leadership of wrongdoings.

Dubinsky intimidated Petr Krumkhanzl, the director of the state-owned PrivatBank (formerly owned by Kolomoyskyi) with Kolomoyskyi's words about the director allegedly being a member of the Waffen-SS. Even after Krumkhanzl was hospitalized with a suspected heart attack, Dubinsky continued to intimidate him: he posted on his Telegram channel that disgruntled people were going to continue protesting at the hospital where Krumkhanzl was hospitalized. He later added that he was not celebrating a heart attack, but simply saying that "Kolomoyskyi's toasts tend to come true." Messages on Dubinsky's Telegram feed indicate that Kolomoyskyi and his supporters were in favor of returning PrivatBank by any means necessary. In his Telegram, Dubinsky often refers to unknown sources when making statements and sharing information in what is seen as an effort to avoid responsibility.

In March 2020 Dubinsky called a foreign journalist a "stray animal" for photographing a meeting between Prime Minister Oleksiy Honcharuk and the head of President's Office Andriy Yermak in a restaurant in Kyiv. He expressed indignation at the work of the journalist in his post on his Facebook page where he called Radio Svoboda odious, empty and idle. Dubinsky also called the journalist "dumb and deceitful.".

On 7 April 2020, Dubinsky shared a screenshot (supposedly fake) on his Facebook page in which, on behalf of Dnipro mayor Borys Filatov, it was promised to shoot pets that residents walk in parks during quarantine during the COVID-19 pandemic. Later on, Dubinsky placed another statement saying that Filatov removed his initial post about pets from his page and affronted the mayor. In the comments section under Dubinsky's post, Filatov threatened Dubinsky using foul language with mutilation to be inflicted once they meet and literally said that Benia's (presumably Kolomoyskyi's) security staff would nor save him. Moreover, Filatov published a post calling (likely) Dubinsky a "Bearded Nana's (a local nickname for Kolomoyskyi) sidekick".

In October 2020 Bihus.Info reported that a December 2013 news report about alleged prostitution on Maidan Nezalezhnosti "that served" Euromaidan demonstrators had been staged by Dubinsky at the request of and paid by then Minister of Revenue and Duties Oleksandr Klymenko. Dubinsky confirmed that he still used the email address that was allegedly used to coordinate the false reporting with Klymenko but denied the accusations.

== Personal life ==
Dubinsky is divorced from Lesia Tsybko. On 11 November 2019, Bihus.Info published an investigation of "Nashi Hroshi" ("Our Money" in Ukrainian) about the property of the Dubinsky family. Investigators believe that Dubinsky refused to show his fortune immediately after his election, because of the large number of cars and real estate he owned with his mother and wife. Dubinsky said that the property was purchased before he took office. Media reported that Dubinsky owned 24 apartments and 17 cars. He refused to declare his property, explaining that he earned it before he became a deputy and that he made decent money as a journalist. He called the Bihus.Info investigation "a hit piece". In addition to apartments and cars, he also owns 70 acres of land and two houses. This property is valued at $2.5 million. According to Dubinsky, his salary on 1+1 was only ₴72,000. A part of the property is registered in his name, another part was in the name of his ex-wife Lesia Tsybko and his mother. Moreover, until 2016 the only official source of his mother's income was a pension. Much of the mother's property in the capital appeared in 2019, an election year. Dubinsky explained that 7 cars, including Mercedes and Maserati, are registered in the name of his mother by saying "Mum likes the speed".

== Honors ==
In 2007, 2008 and 2009 the Business circles "PRESSZVANIE" contest named Dubinsky as the best financial and economic journalist of Ukraine.
