= Intelligence agencies of Russia =

The intelligence agencies of the Russian Federation, often unofficially referred to in Russian as Special services (Russian: Спецслужбы), include:

- Federal Security Service (FSB), an agency responsible for counter-intelligence and other aspects of state security as well as intelligence-gathering in some countries, primarily those of the Commonwealth of Independent States (CIS); reports directly to the President of Russia.
- Main Directorate of Special Programs of the President of the Russian Federation (GUSP), is a federal executive agency that performs functions to ensure the fulfillment of the authority of the President of the Russian Federation in the field of mobilization training and mobilization in the Russian Federation. The scope of their competence is described in the Federal Law "On Mobilization Preparation and Mobilization in the Russian Federation."
- Foreign Intelligence Service (SVR), an agency concerned with collection of intelligence outside the CIS; reports directly to the President of Russia.
- Federal Protective Service (FSO), an agency concerned with the tasks related to the protection of several high-ranking state officials, mandated by the relevant law, including the Russian President, as well as certain federal properties; reports directly to the President of Russia.
- Main Intelligence Directorate (GRU), since 2010 officially the Main Directorate of the General Staff of the Russian Armed Forces (GU), the primary intelligence service of the Russian Armed Forces and is reputedly Russia's largest foreign intelligence agency.

== Coordination and parliamentary supervision ==
The SVR, FSB, FSO and GUSP are all successor agencies to the Soviet Union′s KGB, are administratively independent of each other and report to the President of Russia, who under law is in charge of directing these agencies. The GRU is a structural component of the Russian General Staff, and its director reports to the Chief of the General Staff and the Minister of Defence and to a certain extent may also answer to the President of Russia if ordered so.

The Director of FSB and Director of SVR are permanent ex officio members of the Security Council of Russia, a consultative body under the president of Russia. Although the Director of FSO is not classified as a member of the Russian Security Council, he is invited to join in the meetings when ordered by the President.

Parliamentary supervision over the intelligence community in Russia is undertaken by the Federation Council's Committee for Security and Defense, and the Committee for Security and Anti-Corruption of the State Duma, which supervises Russia's intelligence and security services.

== See also ==
- Law enforcement in Russia
- Silovik
