= Russian interference in the 2020 United States elections =

Russian interference in the 2020 United States elections was a matter of concern at the highest level of national security within the United States government, in addition to the computer and social media industries. In 2020, the RAND Corporation was one of the first to release research describing Russia's playbook for interfering in U.S. elections, developed machine-learning tools to detect the interference, and tested strategies to counter Russian interference. In February and August 2020, United States Intelligence Community (USIC) experts warned members of Congress that Russia was interfering in the 2020 presidential election in then-President Donald Trump's favor. USIC analysis released by the Office of the Director of National Intelligence (DNI) in March 2021 found that proxies of Russian intelligence promoted and laundered misleading or unsubstantiated narratives about Joe Biden "to US media organizations, US officials, and prominent US individuals, including some close to former President Trump and his administration." The New York Times reported in May 2021 that federal investigators in Brooklyn began a criminal investigation late in the Trump administration into possible efforts by several current and former Ukrainian officials to spread unsubstantiated allegations about corruption by Joe Biden, including whether they had used Trump personal attorney Rudy Giuliani as a channel.

== Reports of attempted interference ==
=== Overview ===
In response to Russian interference in the 2016 United States elections, special counsel Robert Mueller conducted a two-year-long investigation. The resulting report concluded that Russia interfered in "sweeping and systematic fashion". In his July 2019 congressional testimony, Mueller stated that the Russians continue to interfere in U.S. elections "as we sit here", and that "many more countries" have developed disinformation campaigns targeting U.S. elections, based partly on the Russian model.

Also in July 2019, the Senate Intelligence Committee released the first volume of a bipartisan report on Russian interference in the 2016 United States elections, a report that included recommendations for securing the 2020 elections. The second volume of that report noted, based on social-media data from October 2018, that "Russian disinformation efforts may be focused on gathering information and data points in support of an active measures campaign targeted at the 2020 U.S. presidential election."

In a highly classified report, the Central Intelligence Agency stated: "We assess that President Vladimir Putin and the senior most Russian officials are aware of and probably directing Russia's influence operations aimed at denigrating the former U.S. Vice President, supporting the U.S. president and fueling public discord ahead of the U.S. election in November." The existence of this report, published at the end of August 2020, was made public knowledge on September 22 in reports from The Washington Post and The New York Times.

U.S. officials have accused Russia, China and Iran of trying to influence the 2020 elections. Between January and late July 2017, Twitter identified and shut down over 7,000 phony accounts created by Iranian influence operations. According to Christopher A. Wray, the Director of the Federal Bureau of Investigation, Russia is attempting to interfere with the 2020 United States elections. Speaking to the Council on Foreign Relations in July 2019, Wray stated, "We are very much viewing 2018 as just kind of a dress rehearsal for the big show in 2020." Dan Coats, the former Director of National Intelligence, believes that Russia and China will both attempt to influence the elections. As of September 2020, intelligence officials point to Russia as the more "acute threat" to the election, saying that China has been expressing its preferences by public rhetoric rather than engaging in covert operations to denigrate a candidate or otherwise interfere in the election itself. Wray testified to the House Committee on Homeland Security on September 17, 2020, that Russian efforts to damage the Biden campaign were "very active".

According to United States intelligence officials interviewed by The New York Times, Russian "operations would be intended to help President Trump, potentially by exacerbating disputes around the results, especially if the race is too close to call." The FBI and the Cybersecurity and Infrastructure Security Agency have stated that Russian cyberattacks have targeted "U.S. state, local, territorial, and tribal government networks, as well as aviation networks".

=== Social-media disinformation and voting infrastructure ===
Various disinformation campaigns on social media have targeted the Democratic Party candidates running in the 2020 Democratic Party presidential primaries. This has prompted considerable concern regarding the ability of social media companies to cope with disinformation and manipulation. By August 2019, Facebook and Twitter had banned advertisements that use misinformation to attempt the suppression of voter turnout.

Microsoft developed an open source software called ElectionGuard to help safeguard the 2020 elections. In mid-July 2019, Microsoft announced that it had, over the prior year, "notified nearly 10,000 customers they've been targeted or compromised by nation-state attacks". Based on attacks that had targeted political organizations, and on experience from 2016 and 2018, Microsoft anticipated "attacks targeting U.S. election systems, political campaigns or NGOs that work closely with campaigns". Of the "nation-state attacks" that had originated from Russia, Microsoft claimed that they followed the "same pattern of engagement" as Russian operations in 2016 and 2018. On September 20, 2019, Microsoft announced that it would provide free security updates for Windows 7, which reached its end-of-life on January 14, 2020, on federally-certified voting machines through the 2020 United States elections. On October 4, 2019, Microsoft announced that "Phosphorus", a group of hackers linked to the Iranian government, had attempted to compromise e-mail accounts belonging to journalists, prominent Iranian expatriates, U.S. government officials and the campaign of a U.S. presidential candidate. While Microsoft did not disclose which campaign had been the target of the cyber attack, unnamed sources informed Reuters that it had been that of Donald Trump.

On October 21, 2019, Facebook CEO Mark Zuckerberg announced that his company has detected a "highly sophisticated" set of campaigns to interfere with the 2020 elections. These campaigns originated from Russia and from Iran. Fake accounts based in Russia posed as Americans of varied political backgrounds and worked to undermine the campaign of Joe Biden, aiming to sow discontent with Biden from both the left and the right.

A September 2019 report from The Washington Post demonstrated that due to bad default passwords and weak encryption, hackers with physical access can easily get into voting machines designed for use in the 2020 United States elections, and remote hacking was possible if the machines were accidentally misconfigured.

On February 21, 2020, The Washington Post reported that, according to unnamed US officials, Russia was interfering in the Democratic primary in an effort to support the nomination of Senator Bernie Sanders. Sanders issued a statement after the news report, saying in part, "I don't care, frankly, who Putin wants to be president. My message to Putin is clear: stay out of American elections, and as president I will make sure that you do." Sanders acknowledged that his campaign was briefed about Russia's alleged efforts about a month prior. Sanders suggested that Russians were impersonating people claiming to be his supporters online in order to create an atmosphere of toxicity and give "Bernie Bros" a bad reputation, a suggestion that Twitter rejected. According to Laura Rosenberger, "Russian attempts to sow discord in the Democratic primary would be consistent with its strategy of undermining Americans' faith in democratic institutions and processes."

In March 2020, the University of Wisconsin–Madison and the Brennan Center for Justice published a report indicating that Russia-linked social media accounts have been spreading Instagram posts calculated to sow division among American voters. According to the report, Russian operatives were increasingly impersonating real political candidates and groups rather than creating fictional groups. According to Twitter's head of site integrity, Russian agents also attempted in 2018 to create the impression of more election interference than is actually happening to undermine confidence in the process. Shortly thereafter, The New York Times reported that according to American intelligence officials Russian operatives have been stoking via private Facebook groups anger among African Americans, emphasizing allegations of police brutality in the United States, highlighting racism in the United States against African Americans, and promoting and pressuring hate groups, including white and black extremist groups, in order to create strife within American society, though American intelligence officials provided few details about the alleged operations. A CNN investigation found that Russian efforts had partly been outsourced to troll farms in Ghana and Nigeria. In May 2020, Twitter suspended 44 accounts that exhibited behavior plausibly, but not definitively, indicative of Russian election interference tactics, including association with a Ghana troll farm.

Government officials and American corporate security officers braced for a repeat of 2016's election infrastructure hacking and similar 21st-century attacks and conducted what were characterized as pre-emptive counter-strikes on botnet infrastructure which might be used in a large-scale coordination of hacking. Some incidents earlier in the year appeared to foreshadow such possibilities. Following his dismissal, in a December 2020 interview, Chris Krebs, the Trump administration's director of the Cybersecurity and Infrastructure Security Agency (CISA), described monitoring Election Day from CISA's joint command center along with representatives from the military's United States Cyber Command, the National Security Agency (NSA), the Federal Bureau of Investigation (FBI), the United States Secret Service (USSS), the Election Assistance Commission (EAC), representatives of vendors of voting machine equipment, and representatives of state and local governments, as well as his agency's analysis preceding and subsequent to that day, saying,

It was quiet. There was no indication or evidence that there was any sort of hacking or compromise of election systems on, before, or after November third.

Responding to spurious claims of foreign outsourcing of vote counting as a rationale behind litigation attempting to stop official vote counting in some areas, Krebs also affirmed that, "All votes in the United States of America are counted in the United States of America."

However, acts of foreign interference did include Russian state-directed application of computational propaganda approaches, more conventional state-sponsored Internet propaganda, smaller-scale disinformation efforts, "information laundering" and "trading up the chain" propaganda tactics employing some government officials, Trump affiliates, and U.S. media outlets, as described below.

=== Briefings to Congress ===
On February 13, 2020, American intelligence officials advised members of the House Intelligence Committee that Russia was interfering in the 2020 election in an effort to get Trump re-elected. The briefing was delivered by Shelby Pierson, the intelligence community's top election security official and an aide to acting Director of National Intelligence Joseph Maguire. Trump allies on the committee challenged the findings, and Trump was angered to learn of the briefing as he believed Democrats might "weaponize" the information against him. He chastised Maguire for allowing the briefing to occur, and days later he appointed Richard Grenell to replace Maguire.

William Evanina, director of the National Counterintelligence and Security Center told members of Congress during a classified briefing on July 31, 2020, that Russia was working to boost the campaign of Trump and undermine that of Biden. Details of Evanina's report were not made public. The Biden campaign confirmed to the Associated Press that they had "faced multiple related threats" but were "reluctant to reveal specifics for fear of giving adversaries useful intelligence". Evanina later stated in a press release, "We assess that Russia is using a range of measures to primarily denigrate former Vice President Biden and what it sees as an anti-Russia 'establishment.'" On August 7, 2020, CNN reported that intelligence officials had provided senators, representatives and both the Biden and Trump campaigns with information "indicating Russia is behind an ongoing disinformation push targeting" Biden. That same day, Democratic congressman Eric Swalwell, a member of the House Intelligence Committee, asserted that Republican senators investigating Biden and his son were "acting as Russian launderers of this information."

=== Giuliani, Derkach, and Johnson ===
According to the Treasury Department, Trump's personal attorney Rudy Giuliani collaborated with active Russian agent Andrii Derkach, a Ukrainian lawmaker, to spread anti-Biden material during Trump's impeachment. The Treasury Department said that Derkach "waged a covert influence campaign centered on cultivating false and unsubstantiated narratives concerning U.S. officials in the upcoming 2020 Presidential Election," including by the release of "edited audio tapes and other unsupported information with the intent to discredit U.S. officials."

Their efforts were aided by journalists like John Solomon, a contributor to Fox News, who, according to Jane Mayer, was pivotal for the dissemination of disinformation about Biden. She stated "No journalist played a bigger part in fueling the Biden corruption narrative than John Solomon."

In late 2019, the chairman of the Senate committee investigating the matter, Ron Johnson, was warned by American intelligence officials of a risk he could be playing into the hands of Russian intelligence to spread disinformation. During this period, Richard Burr (R-NC), chair of the Senate Intelligence Committee, also warned Johnson that Johnson's investigation could aid Russian efforts to promote distrust in the United States' political system. Senators had also been briefed in late 2019 about Russian efforts to frame Ukraine for 2016 election interference. Johnson initially said he would release findings in spring 2020, as Democrats would be selecting their 2020 presidential nominee, but instead ramped up the investigation at Trump's urging in May 2020, after it became clear Biden would be the nominee. In March 2020, Johnson decided to postpone the issuing of a subpoena for former Ukrainian official and employee of a Democratic lobby firm Blue Star Strategies Andrii Telizhenko, a close ally of Rudy Giuliani who had made appearances on the pro-Trump cable channel One America News, after Senator Mitt Romney backed away on voting for Mr. Telizhenko, as the Senators from the Democratic Party pressured Senator Romney on Mr. Telizhenko's vote. Trump tweeted a press report about the investigations, later stating that he would make allegations of corruption by the Bidens a central theme of his re-election campaign. The State Department revoked Telizhenko's visa in October 2020, and CNN reported the American government was considering sanctioning him as a Russian agent.

In May 2020, Andrii Derkach, a Giuliani associate whom Evanina had named as a key participant in Russian interference, released snippets of alleged recordings of Joe Biden speaking with Petro Poroshenko, the Ukrainian president during the years Biden's son, Hunter, worked for Burisma Holdings. The Bidens had been accused without evidence of malfeasance relating to Burisma. The recordings, which were not verified as authentic and appeared heavily edited, depicted Biden linking loan guarantees for Ukraine to the ouster of the country's prosecutor general. The recordings did not provide evidence to support the ongoing conspiracy theory that Biden wanted the prosecutor fired to protect his son. Poroshenko denied In June 2020 that Joe Biden ever approached him about Burisma. In September 2020, the United States Department of the Treasury sanctioned Derkach, stating he "has been an active Russian agent for over a decade, maintaining close connections with the Russian Intelligence Services."

Giuliani, Trump's personal attorney, had spent significant time working in Ukraine during 2019 to gather information about the Bidens, making frequent American television appearances to discuss it. Attorney general Bill Barr confirmed in February 2020 that the Justice Department had created an "intake process" to analyze Giuliani's information. This information included a September 2019 statement by former Ukrainian prosecutor general Viktor Shokin falsely claiming he had been fired at Biden's insistence because Shokin was investigating Biden's son. The statement disclosed that it had been prepared at the request of attorneys for Ukrainian oligarch Dmitry Firtash, which since July 2019 included Joseph diGenova and his wife Victoria Toensing—both close associates of Trump and Giuliani. Firtash, fighting extradition to the United States where he was under federal indictment, is believed by the Justice Department to be connected to high levels of Russian organized crime, which allegedly installed him as a broker for Ukrainian imports of Russian natural gas. He is also reportedly close to the Kremlin to support Russian interests in Ukraine.

According to officials interviewed by The Daily Beast, then-National Security Advisor John Bolton told his staff not to meet with Giuliani, as did his successor Robert C. O'Brien, because Bolton had been informed that Giuliani was spreading conspiracy theories that aligned with Russian interests in disrupting the 2020 election. These officials were also concerned that Giuliani would be used as a conduit for disinformation, including "leaks" of emails that would mix genuine with forged material in order to implicate Hunter Biden in corrupt dealings.

The New York Times reported in November 2019 that Giuliani had directed associate Lev Parnas to approach Firtash about hiring the couple, with the proposition that Firtash could help to provide compromising information on Biden, which Parnas's attorney described was "part of any potential resolution to [Firtash's] extradition matter." Giuliani denied any association with Firtash, though he told CNN he met with a Firtash attorney for two hours in New York City at the time he was seeking information about the Bidens. As vice president, Biden had urged the Ukrainian government to eliminate brokers such as Firtash to reduce the country's reliance on Russian gas. After his October 2019 indictment, Parnas asserted that he, Giuliani, diGenova and Toensing had a deal with Firtash in which the oligarch would provide information to discredit Biden in exchange for Giuliani persuading the Justice Department to drop its efforts to extradite Firtash.

The Washington Post reported in October 2019 that after they began representing Firtash, Toensing and diGenova secured a rare face-to-face meeting with Barr to argue the Firtash charges should be dropped. Prior to that mid-August meeting, Barr had been briefed in detail on the initial Trump–Ukraine whistleblower complaint within the CIA that had been forwarded to the Justice Department, as well as on Giuliani's activities in Ukraine. Bloomberg News reported that its sources told them Giuliani's high-profile publicity of the Shokin statement had greatly reduced the chances of the Justice Department dropping the charges against Firtash, as it would appear to be a political quid pro quo. Barr declined to intervene in the Firtash case. Firtash denied involvement in collecting or financing damaging information on the Bidens.

=== Developments in summer and fall 2020 ===
By the summer of 2020, Russian intelligence had advanced to "information laundering" in which divisive propaganda was reported on Russia-affiliated news websites with the expectation the stories would be picked-up and spread by more legitimate news outlets. In August 2020, The New York Times reported that a video published by RT's Ruptly video platform, of Black Lives Matter protesters apparently burning a bible in Portland, Oregon, edited in a misleading way, "went viral" after it being shared with an inaccurate caption on social media by a far-right personality and then conservative politicians. The Times said the clip "appear[ed] to be one of the first viral Russian disinformation hits of the 2020 presidential campaign". An NBC report in the wake of this incident found that Ruptly edited user-generated protest videos to highlight violence over peaceful protest.

In September 2020, Facebook and Twitter announced that they had been alerted to the existence of Peace Data, a website set up by Russia's Internet Research Agency to interfere with the 2020 election. The social-media companies deleted accounts that had been used in an operation to recruit American journalists to write articles critical of Joe Biden and his running mate Kamala Harris. On September 3, the intelligence branch of the Department of Homeland Security issued a warning to state and federal law enforcement that Russia was "amplifying" concerns about postal voting and other measures taken to protect voters during the COVID-19 pandemic. According to DHS analysts, "Russian malign influence actors" had been spreading misinformation since at least March. Trump had repeatedly asserted without evidence that voting by mail would result in widespread fraud.

ABC News reported in September 2020 that the Homeland Security Department had withheld the July release of an intelligence bulletin to law enforcement that warned of Russian efforts to promote "allegations about the poor mental health" of Joe Biden. DHS chief of staff John Gountanis halted the release pending review by secretary Chad Wolf. The bulletin stated that analysts had "high confidence" of the Russian efforts, which were similar to efforts by Trump and his campaign to depict Biden as mentally unfit. A DHS spokesperson said the bulletin was "delayed" because it did not meet the department's standards. The bulletin had not been released as of the date of the ABC News report. Later in September, Brian Murphy—a former DHS undersecretary for intelligence and analysis—asserted in a whistleblower complaint that Wolf told him "the intelligence notification should be 'held' because it 'made the President look bad.'" Murphy also claimed Wolf told him to "cease providing intelligence assessments on the threat of Russian interference in the US, and instead start reporting on interference activities by China and Iran." Murphy said Wolf told him this directive came from White House national security advisor Robert O'Brien. The DHS inspector general released findings in May 2022 that affirmed the accounts of ABC News and Murphy. The intelligence report on Russian interference appeared to have been "delayed and altered...changes that 'appear to be based in part on political considerations'".

On September 10, 2020, Reuters reported that hackers had tried and failed to breach the systems of SKDKnickerbocker, a political consulting firm that specializes in working for Democratic Party politicians and that had been working with the Biden campaign for two months. Microsoft, who detected the cyberattack, informed SKDKnickerbocker that Russian state-backed hackers were the likely perpetrators.

Analysts and officials interviewed by The New York Times in September 2020 indicated that a primary tactic of Russian disinformation campaigns was to amplify misleading statements from Trump, chiefly about postal voting. Russia's Internet Research Agency also created a fictitious press organization, the "Newsroom for American and European Based Citizens", in order to feed propaganda to right-wing social media users. NAEBC accounts were blocked or suspended by Facebook, Twitter, and LinkedIn, but their content "got more traction" on alt-tech platforms Gab and Parler, according to a Reuters report.

H. R. McMaster, Trump's former national security advisor, said on October 1 that Trump was "aiding and abetting Putin's efforts by not being direct about this. This sustained campaign of disruption, disinformation and denial is aided by any leader who doesn't acknowledge it."

On October 5, The Washington Post reported that the State Department had revoked the travel visa of Giuliani associate Andrii Telizhenko.

On October 21, threatening emails were sent to Democrats in at least four states. The emails warned that "You will vote for Trump on Election Day or we will come after you." Director of National Intelligence John Ratcliffe announced that evening that the emails, using a spoofed return address, had been sent by Iran. He added that both Iran and Russia are known to have obtained American voter registration data, possibly from publicly available information, and that "This data can be used by foreign actors to attempt to communicate false information to registered voters that they hope will cause confusion, sow chaos and undermine your confidence in American democracy." A spokesman for Iran denied the allegation. In his announcement Ratcliffe said that Iran's intent had been "to intimidate voters, incite social unrest, and damage President Trump", raising questions as to how ordering Democrats to vote for Trump would be damaging to Trump. It was later reported that the reference to Trump had not been in Ratcliffe's prepared remarks as signed off by the other officials on the stage, but that he added it on his own.

==== New York Post story ====
In October 2020, the FBI reportedly launched an investigation into whether a story published in the tabloid journal New York Post on October 14 might be part of a Russian disinformation effort targeting Biden. The story, titled "Biden Secret Emails", displayed an email supposedly showing that Hunter Biden had arranged for his father, then-vice-president Joe Biden, to meet with a top advisor to Burisma. The Biden campaign said that no such meeting ever happened. The Post's source for the data was Giuliani, who says he got it from the hard drive of a laptop that was allegedly dropped off at a Delaware repair shop in April 2019 and never picked up. The shop owner told reporters that he thought the person who dropped it off was Hunter Biden but wasn't sure. He said he eventually gave the laptop to the FBI, keeping a copy of the hard drive for himself that he later gave to Giuliani. A year and a half earlier, in early 2019, White House officials had been warned that the Russians were planning to leak forged emails in the weeks before the election, and that Giuliani could be the conduit for such a leak.

Most of the New York Post story was written by a staff reporter who did not allow his name to be used on it because he doubted the story's credibility. According to an investigation by The New York Times, editors at the New York Post "pressed staff members to add their bylines to the story", and at least one refused, in addition to the original author. Of the two writers eventually credited on the article, the second did not know her name was attached to it until after it was published. Giuliani was later quoted as saying he had given the hard drive to the New York Post because "either nobody else would take it, or if they took it, they would spend all the time they could to try to contradict it before they put it out." Several days after the story was published, more than 50 former senior intelligence officials signed a letter saying that while they have no evidence, the story "has all the classic earmarks of a Russian information operation." The New York Times reported that no solid evidence has emerged that the laptop contained Russian disinformation.

==== Hall County, Georgia ====
On October 7, 2020, the government of Hall County, Georgia had all its election-related information released by Russian hackers using DoppelPaymer ransomware.

=== 2021 DNI report ===
The unclassified intelligence report: "INTELLIGENCE COMMUNITY ASSESSMENT ON FOREIGN THREATS TO THE 2020 U.S. FEDERAL ELECTIONS".

According to a declassified DNI report released on March 16, 2021, there was evidence of broad efforts by both Russia and Iran to shape the election's outcome. However, there was no evidence that any votes, ballots, or voter registrations were directly changed. While Iran sought to undermine confidence in the vote and harm Trump's reelection prospects, the report found that Russia's efforts had been aimed at "denigrating President Biden's candidacy and the Democratic Party, supporting former President Trump, undermining public confidence in the electoral process, and exacerbating sociopolitical divisions in the US", central to Moscow's interference effort having been reliance on Russian intelligence agencies′ proxies "to launder influence narratives" by using media organizations, U.S. officials and people close to Trump to push "misleading or unsubstantiated" allegations against Biden. As an example of such activity by Russia the report cited a documentary aired on One America News Network in January 2020, which was identified by news media as The Ukraine Hoax: Impeachment, Biden Cash, and Mass Murder.

The report specifically identified individuals controlled by the Russian government as having been involved in Russia's interference efforts, such as Konstantin Kilimnik and Andrii Derkach. The report said that Putin was likely to have had "purview" over the activities of Andrii Derkach. According to the report, Putin had authorized the Russian influence operations. Following the publication of the DNI report, House Intelligence Committee Chairman Adam Schiff issued a statement that said, "Through proxies, Russia ran a successful intelligence operation that penetrated the former president's inner circle."

== Government reaction ==
Dan Coats appointed Shelby Pierson as the U.S. election security czar in July 2019, creating a new position in a move seen as an acknowledgment that foreign influence operations against U.S. elections will be ongoing indefinitely. Election-security task forces established before the 2018 midterm elections at the FBI, the Department of Homeland Security, the National Security Agency and the United States Cyber Command have been expanded and "made permanent". The Department of Homeland Security indicated that the threat of ransomware attacks upon voter registration databases was a particular concern.

Prior to resigning as U.S. Secretary of Homeland Security, Kirstjen Nielsen attempted to organize a meeting of the U.S. Cabinet to discuss how to address potential foreign interference in the 2020 elections. Mick Mulvaney, the White House Chief of Staff, reportedly warned her to keep the subject away from Trump, who views the discussion as questioning the legitimacy of his victory in 2016. Mitch McConnell, the Senate Majority Leader, has blocked various bills intended to improve election security from being considered, including some measures that have had bipartisan support. Election-security legislation remains stalled in the Senate as of February 2020. However, various states have implemented changes, such as paper ballots. Florida has expanded its paper-ballot backup system since 2016, but experts warn that its voting systems are still vulnerable to manipulation, a particular concern being the electronic poll books that store lists of registered voters. All 67 election supervisors in Florida have been required to sign nondisclosure agreements, and consequently, information such as the identity of which four counties had been hacked by Russian intelligence in 2016 remains unknown to the public. Democratic members of Congress cited the lack of effort to secure U.S. elections against foreign interference, particularly from Russia, as among grounds to begin an impeachment inquiry.

On September 30, 2019, the United States issued economic sanctions against seven Russians affiliated with the Internet Research Agency, an organization that manipulates social media for misinformation purposes. The sanctions were described as a warning against foreign interference in United States elections.

On December 9, 2019, FBI Director Christopher A. Wray told ABC News: "as far as the [2020] election itself goes, we think Russia represents the most significant threat." According to William Evanina, director of the National Counterintelligence and Security Center, Russia is "using social media and many other tools to inflame social divisions, promote conspiracy theories and sow distrust in our democracy and elections."

Bloomberg News reported in January 2020 that American intelligence and law enforcement were examining whether Russia was involved in promoting disinformation to undermine Joe Biden as part of a campaign to disrupt the 2020 election. The following month, the Estonian Foreign Intelligence Service warned that Russia would attempt to interfere in the Georgian parliamentary election in October 2020 as well as the US election in November.

On July 13, 2020, House Speaker Nancy Pelosi and Senate Minority Leader Chuck Schumer wrote to FBI Director Wray, requesting a briefing on a "concerted foreign interference campaign" targeting the United States Congress. The request for an all-Congress briefing, also signed by Rep. Adam Schiff and Sen. Mark Warner, was made public one week later, save for a classified addendum that was not released to the media.

=== Trump administration reaction ===
The Trump administration reacted to the briefing by American intelligence officials to the House Intelligence Committee that Russia was interfering in the 2020 election in an effort to get Trump re-elected by rejecting the efforts were in favor of Trump and by firing Joseph Maguire, who was involved in those reports.

By contrast, Trump and his national security adviser Robert O'Brien accepted reports the Russians were supporting the nomination of Bernie Sanders.

Three weeks after Trump loyalist Richard Grenell was appointed acting Director of National Intelligence, intelligence officials briefed members of Congress behind closed doors that they had "not concluded that the Kremlin is directly aiding any candidate's re-election or any other candidates' election," which differed from testimony they had provided the previous month indicating that Russia was working to aid Trump's candidacy. Two intelligence officials pushed back on suggestions the new testimony was politically motivated. One intelligence official asserted the earlier testimony had overreached and that Democrats had mischaracterized it. Kash Patel, a former aide to congressman Devin Nunes who joined Grenell at the ODNI, imposed limits on what intelligence officials could tell Congress about foreign influence operations. The briefers reportedly did not intend to contradict their previous testimony, though they avoided repeating it.

Trump and his surrogates asserted that China, rather than Russia, posed the greater risk to election security and was trying to help Biden win. In August 2020, Trump tweeted that "Chinese State Media and Leaders of CHINA want Biden to win 'the U.S. Election."" Donald Trump Jr. asserted at the August Republican convention that "Beijing Biden is so weak on China that the intelligence community recently assessed that the Chinese Communist Party favors Biden." Director of National Intelligence John Ratcliffe stated during an August Fox News appearance, "China is using a massive and sophisticated influence campaign that dwarfs anything that any other country is doing." Attorney general Bill Barr and national security advisor Robert O'Brien made similar assertions. Intelligence community officials have publicly and privately said that the underlying intelligence indicates that while China would prefer Trump not be reelected, the nation had not been actively interfering and that Russia remained the far greater threat, working to undermine Biden. Trump also asserted that China was trying to stoke race protests in an effort to help Biden, which was also not supported by the intelligence community's assessment. The United States intelligence community released analysis in March 2021 finding that China had considered interfering with the election but decided against it on concerns it would fail or backfire.

Following Joe Biden's apparent win—which Trump was actively disputing through numerous lawsuits—Chris Krebs, the director of the Department of Homeland Security's Cybersecurity and Infrastructure Security Agency, issued a statement on November 12: "There is no evidence that any voting system deleted or lost votes, changed votes, or was in any way compromised." Trump tweeted on November 17 that he had fired Krebs as a result of this statement.

=== Putin administration reaction ===
Russian officials denied that it had interfered in the 2016 election or that it was interfering in the 2020 election. On September 25, 2020, Putin released a formal statement seeking mutual "guarantees of non-interference" in U.S. and Russian elections and asking the United States "to approve a comprehensive program of practical measures to reset our relations in the use of information and communication technologies (ICT)."

== Interference from the administration ==
In a June 2019 interview with George Stephanopoulos, Donald Trump said that he would accept information from other nations about his opponents in the 2020 United States presidential election.

According to reporting by The Wall Street Journal, The Washington Post and The New York Times, Trump and his personal attorney Rudy Giuliani repeatedly pressed the Ukrainian government to investigate Hunter Biden, the son of Joe Biden, leading to the ongoing Trump–Ukraine scandal. Biden was viewed as a potentially strong Trump challenger in the 2020 presidential election, and the purpose of the requested investigation was alleged to be to damage Biden's election campaign for president. Reports suggested that Trump threatened to withhold military aid from Ukraine unless they investigated Biden. The controversy triggered the commencement of the formal process of impeachment inquiries against Trump on September 24, with House speaker Nancy Pelosi directing six House committee chairmen to proceed "under that umbrella of impeachment inquiry".

On October 3, 2019, while discussing negotiations on a possible agreement in the ongoing China–United States trade war, he said that "if they [China] don't do what we want, we have tremendous power." He then said that "China should start an investigation" into presidential candidate Joe Biden and his son Hunter Biden. Chair of the Federal Election Commission Ellen Weintraub then retweeted a June statement explaining that "it is illegal for any person to solicit, accept, or receive anything of value from a foreign national in connection with a U.S. election".

As of early October 2019, there is evidence President Trump, Vice President Mike Pence, U.S. Attorney General William Barr, as well as Trump's personal attorney Giuliani solicited help from Ukraine and China for assistance in discrediting Trump's political opponents. Trump also dispatched Barr to meet with Italian officials as part of Trump's efforts to discredit the Mueller investigation into Russian interference in the 2016 election. Trump also pressed Australian Prime Minister Scott Morrison to give Barr information that Trump hoped would discredit the Mueller inquiry, in a call that (like Trump's earlier call with Ukrainian president Volodymyr Zelensky), used diplomatic contacts to advance Trump's "personal political interests." According to a report in the Times of London, Trump also personally contacted British Prime Minister Boris Johnson to seek help to discredit the Mueller investigation.

A Department of Homeland Security intelligence bulletin, warning about Russian interference in the 2020 election, was planned for release on July 9 but was blocked by acting Secretary of Homeland Security Chad Wolf's chief of staff. The bulletin, intended to be distributed among law-enforcement agencies, indicated that Russian disinformation operations would denigrate the mental health of Joe Biden.

== Aftermath ==
Russian interference in the 2020 election was significantly less severe than it had been in 2016. Experts suggested a variety of possible explanations, not mutually exclusive. These include a hardening of American cyber defenses, reluctance on Russia's part to risk reprisals, and the fact that misinformation intended to delegitimize the election was already prevalent within the United States thanks to unfounded claims by Trump and others.

On April 15, 2021, the Biden administration expelled 10 Russian diplomats and sanctioned six Russian companies that support Russia's cyber activities, in addition to 32 individuals and entities for its role in the interference and the 2020 United States federal government data breach.

The New York Times reported in May 2021 that federal investigators in Brooklyn began a criminal investigation late in the Trump administration into possible efforts by several current and former Ukrainian officials to spread unsubstantiated allegations about corruption by Joe Biden. Investigators were examining whether the Ukrainians used Giuliani as a channel for the allegations, though he was not a specific subject of the investigation, in contrast to a long-running investigation of Giuliani by the US attorney's office in Manhattan.

== See also ==
- Cold War II
- Cyberwarfare and Iran
- Cyberwarfare by Russia
- Cyberwarfare and China
- Cyberwarfare and the United States
- Democratic National Committee cyber attacks
- Foreign electoral intervention
- Green Party of the United States § Russia
- Presidency of Donald Trump
- Russian espionage in the United States
- Russian interference in the 2016 United States elections
- Russian interference in the 2018 United States elections
- Russian interference in the 2024 United States elections
- Social media in the 2016 United States presidential election
- Social media in the 2020 United States presidential election
- Timelines related to Donald Trump and Russian interference in United States elections
- 1996 United States campaign finance controversy
