= Richard Grenell =

American politician (born 1966)

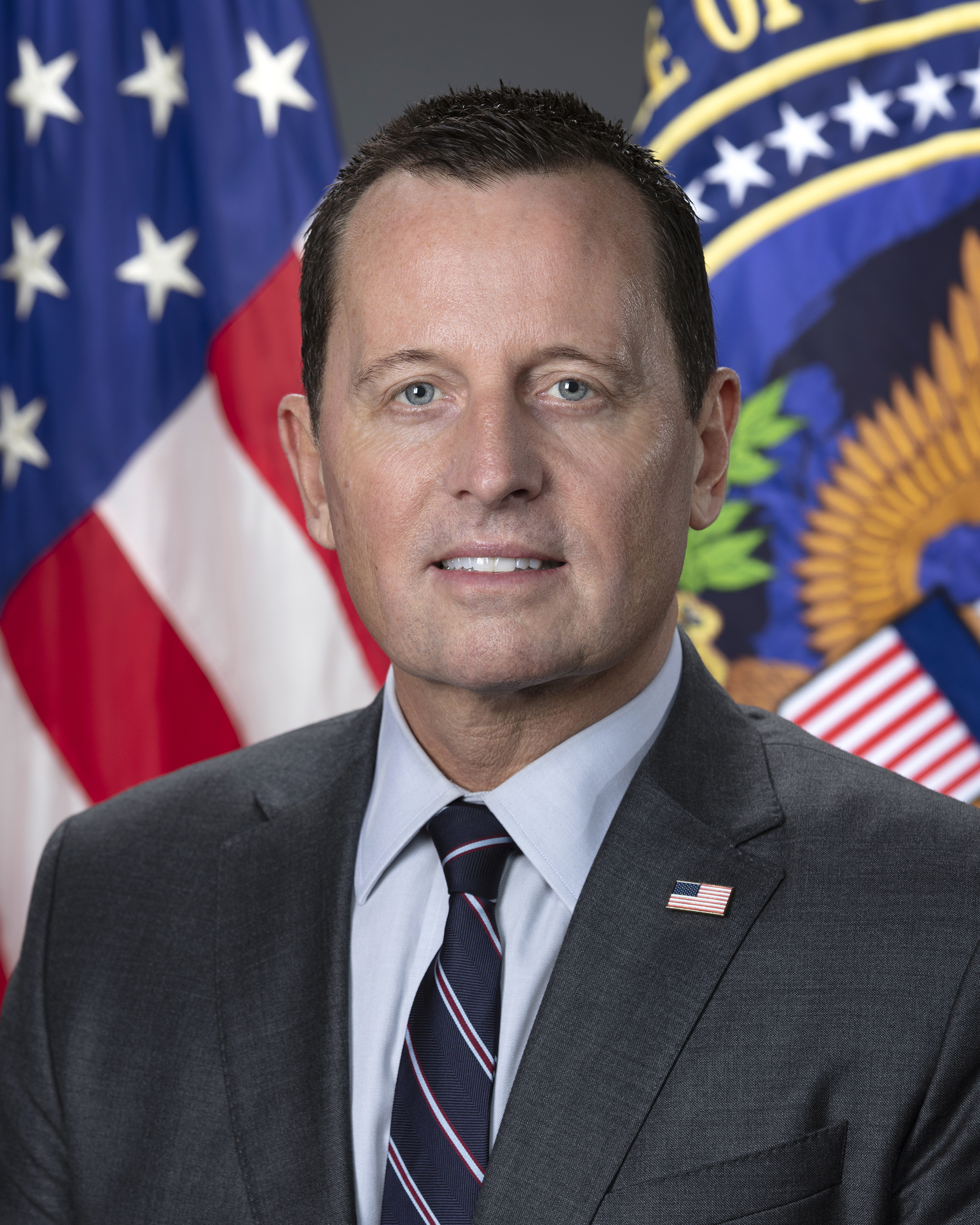
- Official portrait, 2020

Special Presidential Envoy for Special Missions
- Incumbent
- Assumed office January 20, 2025
- President: Donald Trump
- Preceded by: Position established

President and Executive Director of the John F. Kennedy Center for the Performing Arts
- Acting
- In office February 12, 2025 – March 16, 2026
- Preceded by: Deborah Rutter
- Succeeded by: Matt Floca

Special Presidential Envoy for Serbia and Kosovo Peace Negotiations
- In office October 4, 2019 – January 20, 2021
- President: Donald Trump
- Preceded by: Position established
- Succeeded by: Position abolished

United States Ambassador to Germany
- In office May 8, 2018 – June 1, 2020
- President: Donald Trump
- Preceded by: John B. Emerson
- Succeeded by: Amy Gutmann

Director of National Intelligence
- Acting
- In office February 20, 2020 – May 26, 2020
- President: Donald Trump
- Deputy: Andrew P. Hallman; Kash Patel; Neil Wiley
- Preceded by: Andrew P. Hallman (acting)
- Succeeded by: John Ratcliffe

Personal details
- Born: Richard Allen Grenell; September 18, 1966 (age 60) Jenison, Michigan, U.S.
- Party: Republican
- Domestic partner: Matt Lashey
- Education: Evangel University (BA); Harvard University (MPA)

Richard Allen Grenell (born September 18, 1966) is an American diplomat, public official, and former public relations consultant who has served as the special presidential envoy for special missions since 2025. Grenell additionally served as the acting director of the Kennedy Center from February 2025 to March 2026.

A member of the Republican Party, he served as acting director of national intelligence (DNI) in 2020 under President Donald Trump, for which he is often cited as the first openly gay acting Cabinet-level official in U.S. history. (Note: Demetrios Marantis served as acting United States Trade Representative, a Cabinet-level position, in 2013.) He previously served as the United States ambassador to Germany from 2018 to 2020, and as the special presidential envoy for Serbia and Kosovo peace negotiations from 2019 to 2021.

Grenell was a U.S. State Department spokesperson to the United Nations during the George W. Bush administration. Following his State Department tenure, he formed Capitol Media Partners, a political consulting firm; he also was a Fox News contributor. Grenell was a foreign policy spokesperson for Mitt Romney during his 2012 presidential campaign.

In September 2017, Trump nominated Grenell as the U.S. ambassador to Germany. On April 26, 2018, he was confirmed by the U.S. Senate by a vote of 56 to 42. Grenell presented his credentials to the president of Germany, Frank-Walter Steinmeier, on May 8, 2018. His tenure in Germany was controversial; he was described as politically and diplomatically isolated due to his association with the far right, and he was criticized as displaying a lack of professionalism.

Trump named Grenell acting director of national intelligence in February 2020; he relinquished the role in May 2020 upon the confirmation of John Ratcliffe to the post. Grenell expressed interest in running in the 2021 California gubernatorial recall election, but on July 15, 2021—the day before the filing deadline—he appeared on The Sean Hannity Show to announce that he would not run as a replacement candidate.

== Early life and education ==
Grenell was born in Michigan. He attended elementary school in Redwood City, California. He graduated from Jenison High School in Michigan in 1984.

He received a bachelor's degree in government and public administration from Evangel University in Springfield, Missouri. He received a master's degree in public administration from Harvard University's John F. Kennedy School of Government.

== Career ==
Prior to his service at the State Department, Grenell was a political adviser to a number of Republicans, including George Pataki and Dave Camp. He also served as press secretary for Mark Sanford on Capitol Hill in the mid-1990s.

=== Minister-Counselor, State Department (2001–2008) ===
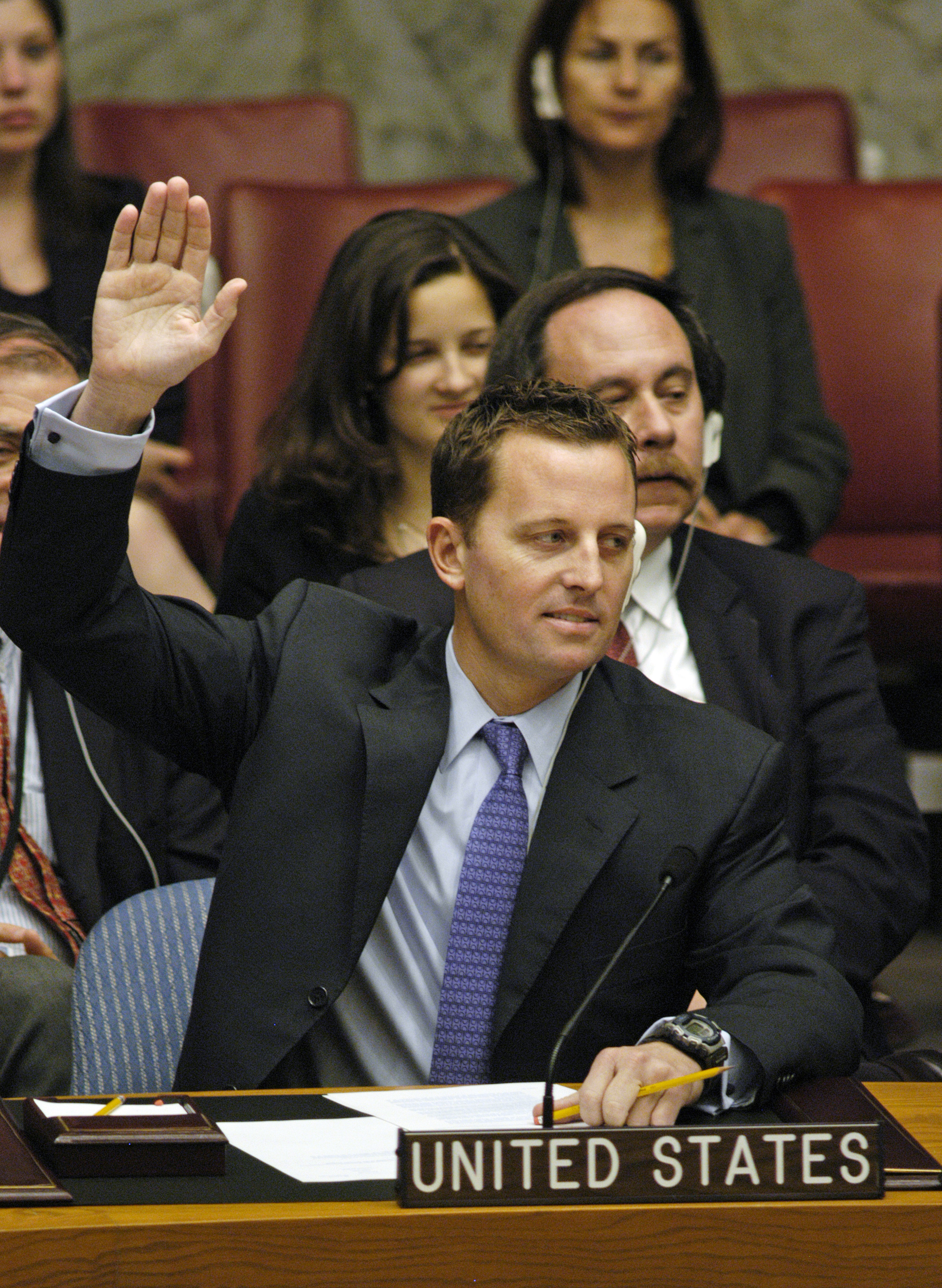
Grenell voting at a UN Security Council meeting in 2005

In 2001, Grenell was appointed by President George W. Bush as Director of Communications and Public Diplomacy for the United States permanent representative to the United Nations in New York with the rank of Minister-Counselor. Serving in that role until 2008, Grenell advised four different U.S. ambassadors. During his tenure, Grenell promulgated U.S. official position and strategy on such issues as the war on terror, global peacekeeping operations, nuclear proliferation, and the UN Oil for Food corruption scandal.

=== Consulting, media, and campaign work (2009–2017) ===
In 2009, Grenell founded Capitol Media Partners, an international strategic media and public affairs consultancy. He was also under contract as a Fox News contributor, commenting on foreign affairs and the media. Grenell has written for The Wall Street Journal, CBS News, CNN, Politico, Huffington Post, The Washington Times, and Al Jazeera.

Grenell worked for Republican candidate Mitt Romney as a spokesperson (on foreign policy), during his 2012 presidential campaign, making him the first openly gay person in that role for a Republican presidential candidate.

Grenell was a signatory to a 2013 amicus curiae brief submitted to the Supreme Court in support of same-sex marriage during the Hollingsworth v. Perry case.

In 2016, Grenell's consulting firm accepted more than $100,000 from the Magyar Foundation of North America to provide public relations support for the Hungarian government of Prime Minister Viktor Orbán. Grenell did not disclose this payment under the Foreign Agents Registration Act (FARA) prior to his work in the Trump administration.

During the 2016 Republican primaries, Grenell warned his Twitter followers about Donald Trump, describing him as "unserious", "reckless", and "dangerous". Grenell deleted all of his negative tweets about Trump after Trump became the Republican nominee. Grenell then began praising Trump regularly on Fox News and on Twitter.

Days after Grenell's appointment as DNI, CNN reported that his personal website had—until 2018—touted consulting work he had done for clients in Iran, China, Kazakhstan, and other countries.

=== Ambassador to Germany (2017–2020) ===
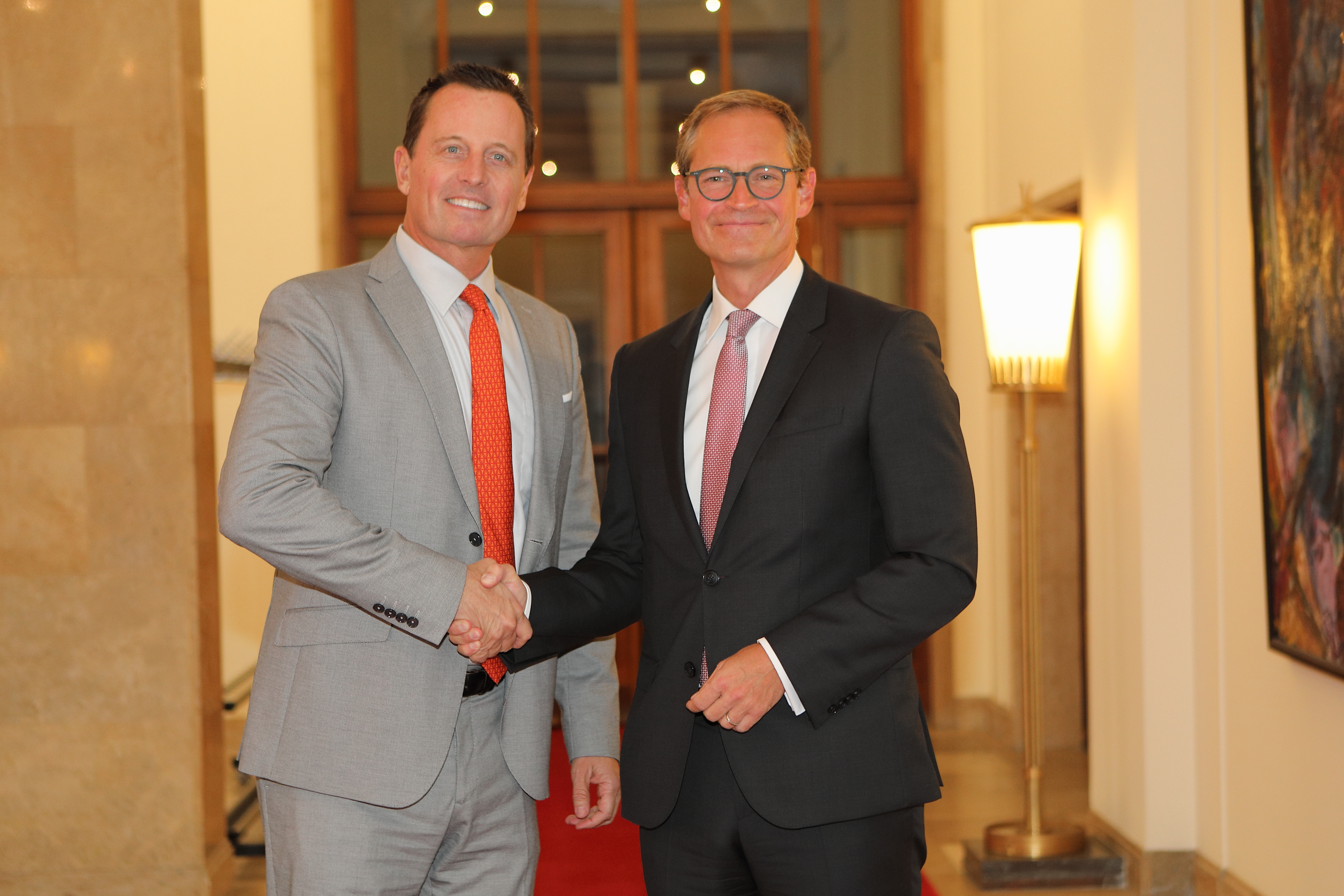
Grenell (left) with Berlin Governing Mayor Michael Müller in 2018

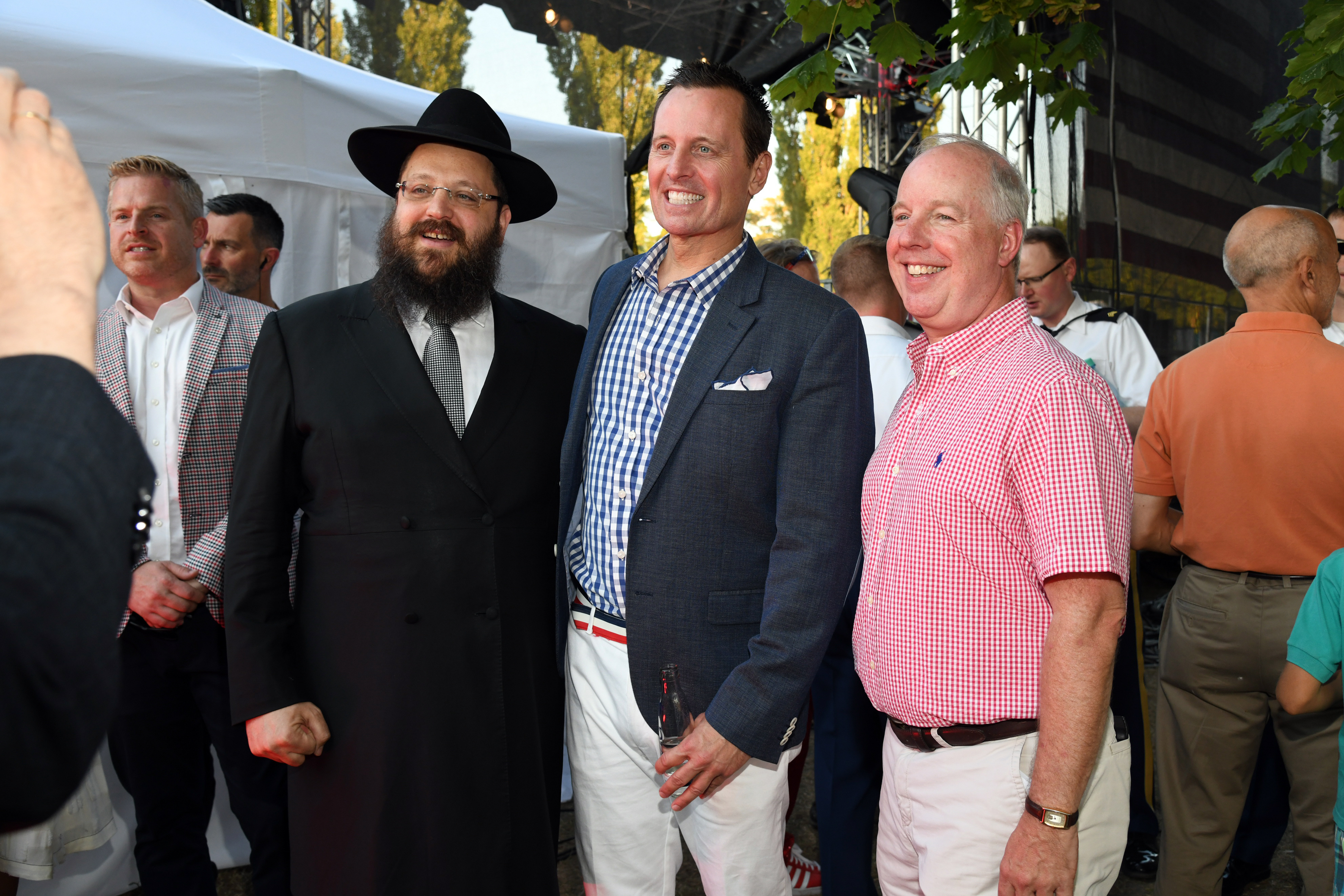
Ambassador Grenell and Deputy Chief of Mission Kent Logsdon with Yehudah Teichtal at the U.S. Embassy in Berlin, 2018

In September 2017, Trump nominated Grenell to become the United States ambassador to Germany. After a significant delay, the United States Senate confirmed Grenell 56–42 on April 26, 2018. Grenell was sworn in by Vice President Mike Pence on May 3, 2018, making him the highest-ranking openly gay U.S. ambassador. Grenell was also under consideration for the posts of U.S. ambassador to NATO and U.S. ambassador to the United Nations, the latter position being filled by Ambassador Kelly Craft.

Grenell presented his credentials to the president of Germany on May 8, 2018. Within hours of taking office, Grenell offended German diplomats and business leaders when he tweeted that "German companies doing business in Iran should wind down operations immediately". The tweet was widely perceived as a threat, with the Foreign Minister of Luxembourg, Jean Asselborn, commenting that "This man was accredited as ambassador only yesterday. To give German businesses such orders (…) that is just not how you can treat your allies". The leader of Germany's Social Democratic Party said that Grenell "does appear to need some tutoring" in the "fine art of diplomacy", while the Left Party urged the Merkel government to summon Grenell to explain his comments.

Grenell stirred controversy in June 2018 by telling Breitbart News, "I absolutely want to empower other conservatives throughout Europe, other leaders". This comment was described as a breach of diplomatic protocol and a breach of Article 41 of the Vienna Convention on Diplomatic Relations, which stipulates that ambassadors have a "duty not to interfere in the internal affairs of that State". Prominent German politicians called for Grenell's dismissal. Martin Schulz, former leader of the Social Democratic Party of Germany, said, "What this man is doing is unheard of in international diplomacy. If a German ambassador were to say in Washington that he is there to boost the Democrats, he would have been kicked out immediately."

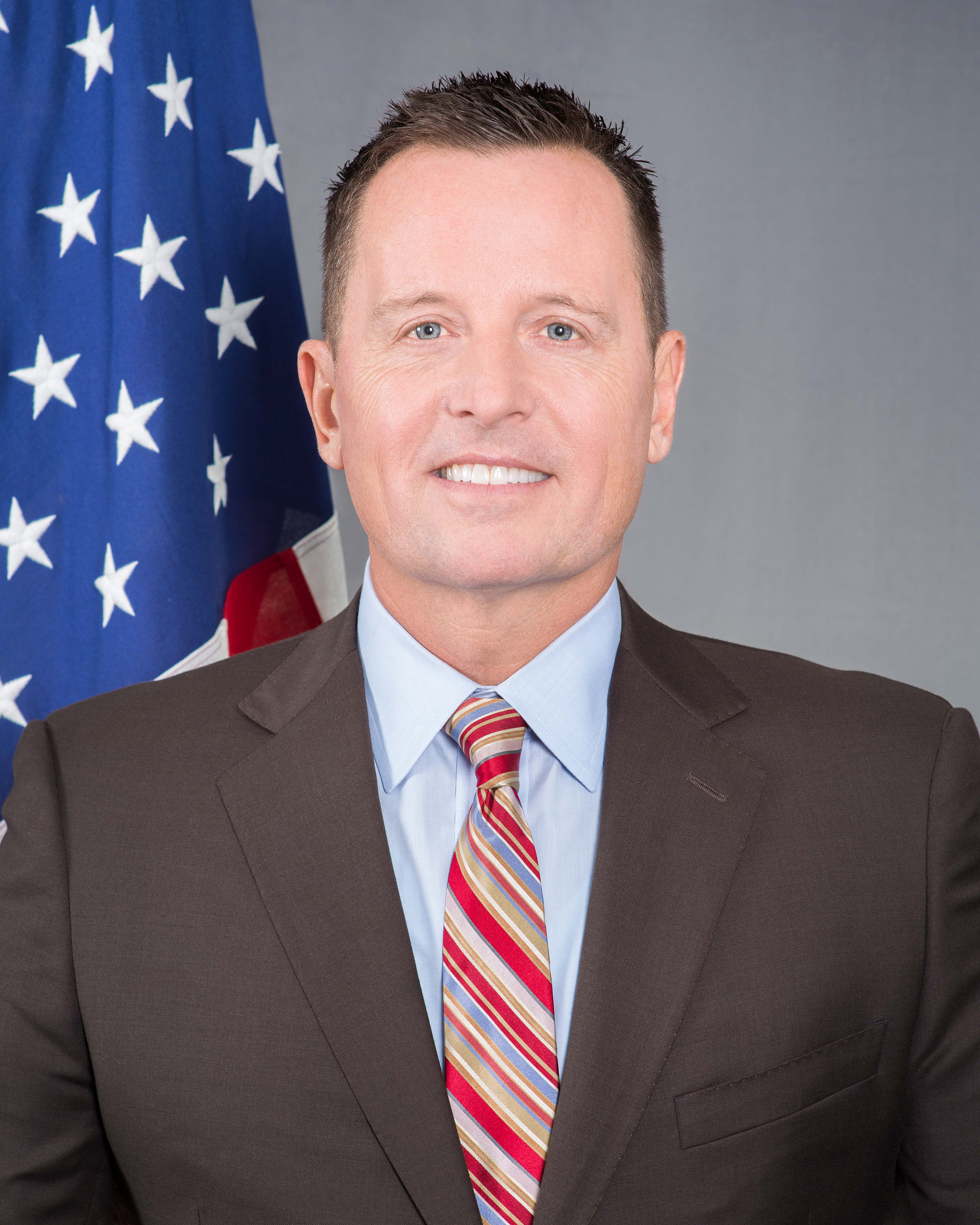
Ambassador portrait

Grenell was a regular contributor on Fox News's Tucker Carlson Tonight during the first few months of his ambassadorship in Germany. In November 2018, he appeared on the show and repeated his criticism of Angela Merkel's immigration policies. Grenell contrasted Merkel with the recently elected Chancellor of Austria Sebastian Kurz, who (according to Grenell) "won in a very big way" because of his strict stance on immigration. The magazine Der Spiegel called these remarks a "thinly veiled call for a change of government in Berlin". Grenell's perceived interference in German politics drew criticism from several high-ranking German politicians. In March 2019, Wolfgang Kubicki, Vice President of the Bundestag and deputy chairman of the Free Democratic Party, charged Grenell with acting "like a high commissioner of an occupying power" and called for Grenell to be expelled from Germany.

In December 2018, during the furor surrounding Der Spiegel writer Claas Relotius, who it turned out had been fabricating stories for years, Grenell wrote to the magazine complaining about an anti-American institutional bias, and asked for an independent investigation. In January 2019, Grenell told Handelsblatt that European companies participating in the construction of the Nord Stream 2 gas pipeline are "always in danger, because sanctions are always possible". U.S. administrations had long opposed the Russian-backed Nord Stream 2, a pipeline for delivering natural gas from Russia to Germany. Grenell also threatened to sanction German companies involved in the construction of the Nord Stream 2.

Der Spiegel published a profile of Grenell on January 11, 2019, using interviews with 30 "American and German diplomats, cabinet members, lawmakers, high-ranking officials, lobbyists and think tank experts". The magazine wrote that "almost all of these sources paint an unflattering portrait of the ambassador, one remarkably similar to Donald Trump, the man who sent him to Berlin. A majority of them describe Grenell as a vain, narcissistic person who dishes out aggressively, but can barely handle criticism." The profile claimed that Grenell was politically isolated in Berlin because of his alleged association with the far-right Alternative for Germany Party, causing the leaders of the mainstream German parties—including the Chancellor herself—to avoid contact with him; while Grenell had pressed German parliamentarians to invite him to their districts, most had declined. The sources claimed that Grenell knew little "about Germany and Europe, that he ignores most of the dossiers his colleagues at the embassy write for him, and that his knowledge of the subject matter is superficial".

In the fall of 2018, Grenell played a key diplomatic role in planning the arrest of Julian Assange by providing backchannel assurances to Ecuador that Assange would not face the death penalty in the United States.

In February 2019, it was announced that Grenell was leading the Trump administration's newly formed effort to promote the decriminalization of homosexuality in nations in which homosexuality was illegal.

In January 2020, Lev Parnas told The Daily Beast that he was told to ask Grenell for advance notice if the DOJ were to move to extradite indicted Ukrainian oligarch Dmytro Firtash. Among other actions as ambassador, Grenell pressured Germany to take a tougher stance against Iran and Hezbollah.

Following his appointment as Acting Director of National Intelligence, Grenell has said he would resign as ambassador once a full-time DNI was confirmed. On May 25, 2020, after John Ratcliffe was confirmed, Grenell confirmed he would resign as ambassador in the coming weeks. He formally resigned on June 1, 2020.

=== Special presidential envoy for Serbia and Kosovo peace negotiations ===
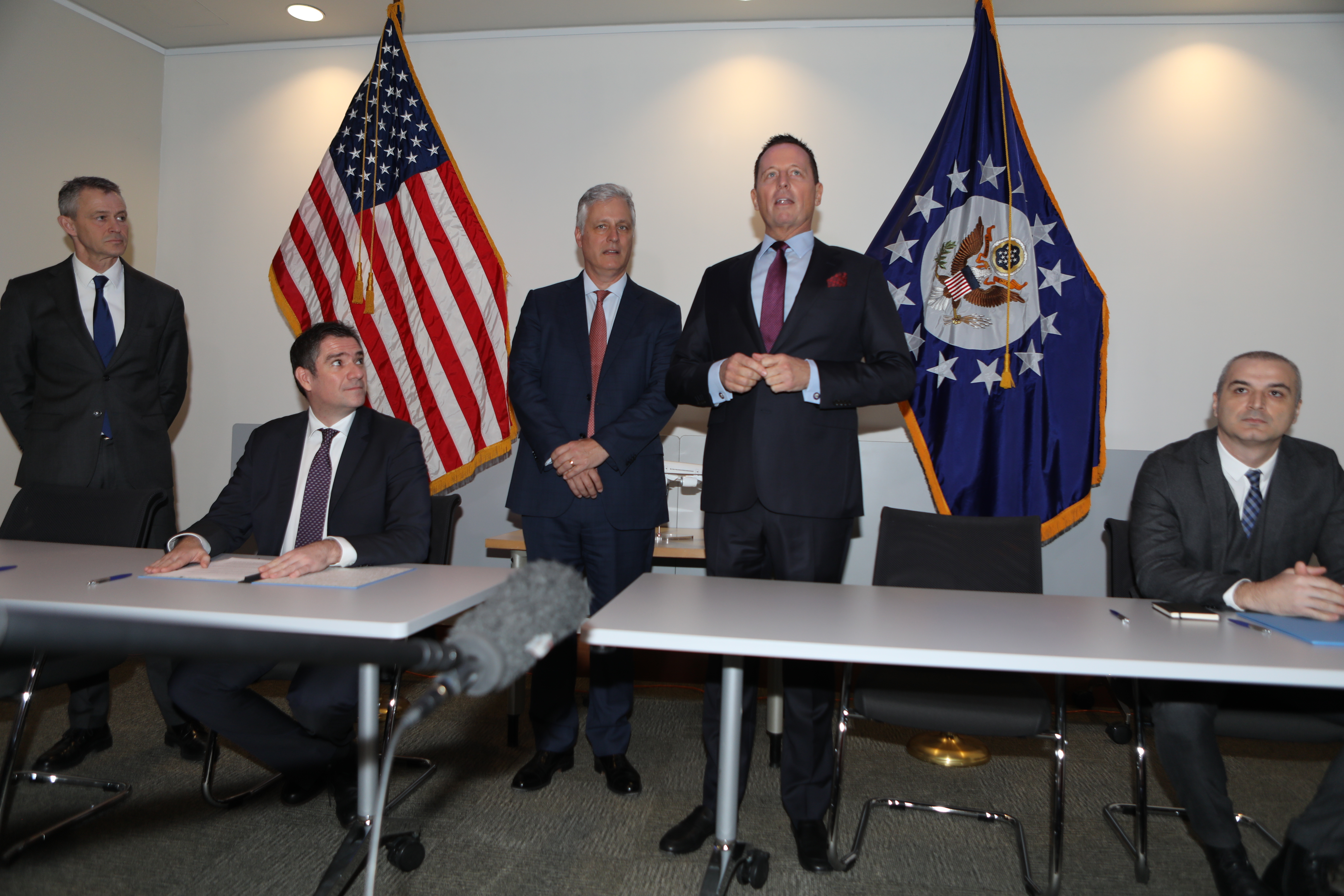
Milun Trivunac, State Secretary of the Ministry of Economy of Serbia (sitting left), Richard Grenell, Special U.S. Presidential Envoy for Serbia and Kosovo Peace Negotiations (standing right), Eset Berisha, Director of the Civil Aviation Authority of Kosovo (sitting right)

In October 2019, Trump named Grenell a special envoy for Serbia and Kosovo peace negotiations. He continued serving part-time as special envoy after his resignation as ambassador, working from the White House. After months of diplomatic talks, on January 20, 2020, Grenell facilitated negotiations between Serbia and Kosovo where the two nations agreed to restore flights between their capitals for the first time in more than two decades. A June 27, 2020, peace summit between the two sides was arranged to take place in Washington D.C., but was canceled due to the potential indictment of Hashim Thaçi on war crimes.

According to a report by NPR, Grenell pressured Kosovo prime minister Albin Kurti to accept a deal favorable to Serbia, including dropping tariffs and agreeing to land swaps, and publicly threatened to withdraw U.S. peacekeepers. The analysis says this contributed to Kurti's removal as prime minister, prompting popular protests from his anti-corruption supporters.

Grenell organized a new summit, located at the White House, for September 3 and 4, 2020. Grenell, along with his friend Robert C. O'Brien, cohosted the talks. On September 4, Serbian president Aleksandar Vučić and Kosovo prime minister Avdullah Hoti signed the Kosovo and Serbia economic agreements. The signing ceremony took place in the Oval Office at the White House in Trump's presence on September 4, 2020. In September 2020, Grenell traveled to Kosovo to receive the Presidential Medal of Merits from President Thaçi. His tenure ended with the end of the Trump presidency on January 20, 2021.

=== Acting Director of National Intelligence ===
==== Tenure ====
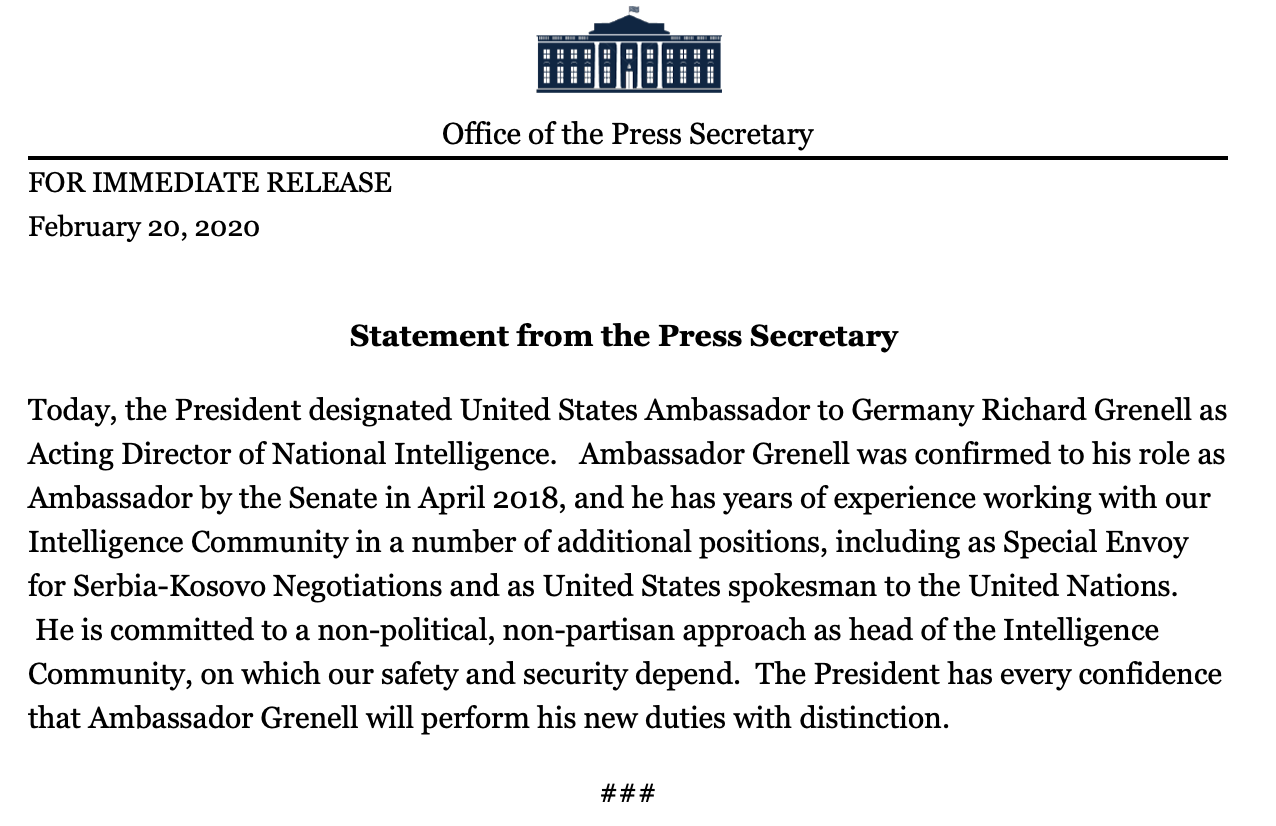
Appointment

On February 13, 2020, Shelby Pierson—the intelligence community's top election security official, deputy to Joseph Maguire—advised members of the House Intelligence Committee that Russia was interfering in the 2020 election in an effort to get Trump re-elected. Trump chastised Maguire for allowing the briefing, concerned that Democrats might "weaponize" the information against him.

On February 20, 2020, Trump replaced Maguire as Acting Director of National Intelligence, appointing Grenell to the role. Maguire and his deputy, Andrew Hallman, resigned from the Office of the Director for National Intelligence (ODNI). Kash Patel—a National Security Council official and former aide to Congressman Devin Nunes—was named the next day as a senior advisor to Grenell.

As a temporary incumbent, Grenell was not subject to Senate confirmation. Although Trump indicated he would be appointing a new U.S. ambassador to Germany, Grenell kept this position while also serving in his new role, and Grenell indicated he did not expect to take the director of national intelligence job on a permanent basis.

On February 28, 2020, Trump announced the nomination of U.S. representative John Ratcliffe to the post of Director of National Intelligence. The nomination allowed Grenell to stay on as Acting Director pending Ratcliffe's confirmation. With Ratcliffe's confirmation and installation, Grenell's tenure as Acting Director ended on May 26, 2020.

==== Policies ====
Grenell enacted a hiring freeze at ODNI and ordered a review of the agency's personnel and mission. On May 8, he announced a reorganization of ODNI including a consolidated cyber office, and on May 15, he announced organizational changes to the National Counterterrorism Center. Also on May 15, Grenell announced that ODNI would lead election security threat briefings for 2020 presidential candidates, replacing the FBI.

In April 2020, Grenell said the administration was considering policies to reduce intelligence-sharing with countries that criminalize homosexuality. On April 29, 2020, he ordered each intelligence agency to review their policies on handling and sharing information on U.S. citizens.

On April 2 and 15, 2020, Grenell acted to declassify several footnotes in a report on FISA abuse released by DOJ inspector general Michael E. Horowitz. He also played a role in the release of 57 transcripts of Russia probe interviews by the House Intelligence Committee. On May 12, 2020, Grenell declassified the names of Obama administration officials who unmasked Michael Flynn. A subsequent Justice Department investigation of Obama administration unmasking concluded in October 2020 with no findings of substantive wrongdoing. On May 19, 2020, Grenell declassified an email that Obama's national security advisor Susan Rice sent to herself. On the day his tenure ended, Grenell declassified several documents related to the Russia probe.

=== Private sector (2020–2024) ===
In August 2020, the American Center for Law and Justice announced that Grenell had been named Special Advisor for National Security and Foreign Policy for the organization. That month, Grenell became a senior advisor to the Republican National Committee, focusing on outreach to LGBT voters. In 2021, Grenell was also hired as on-air analyst and contributor by Newsmax.

==== Controversies ====
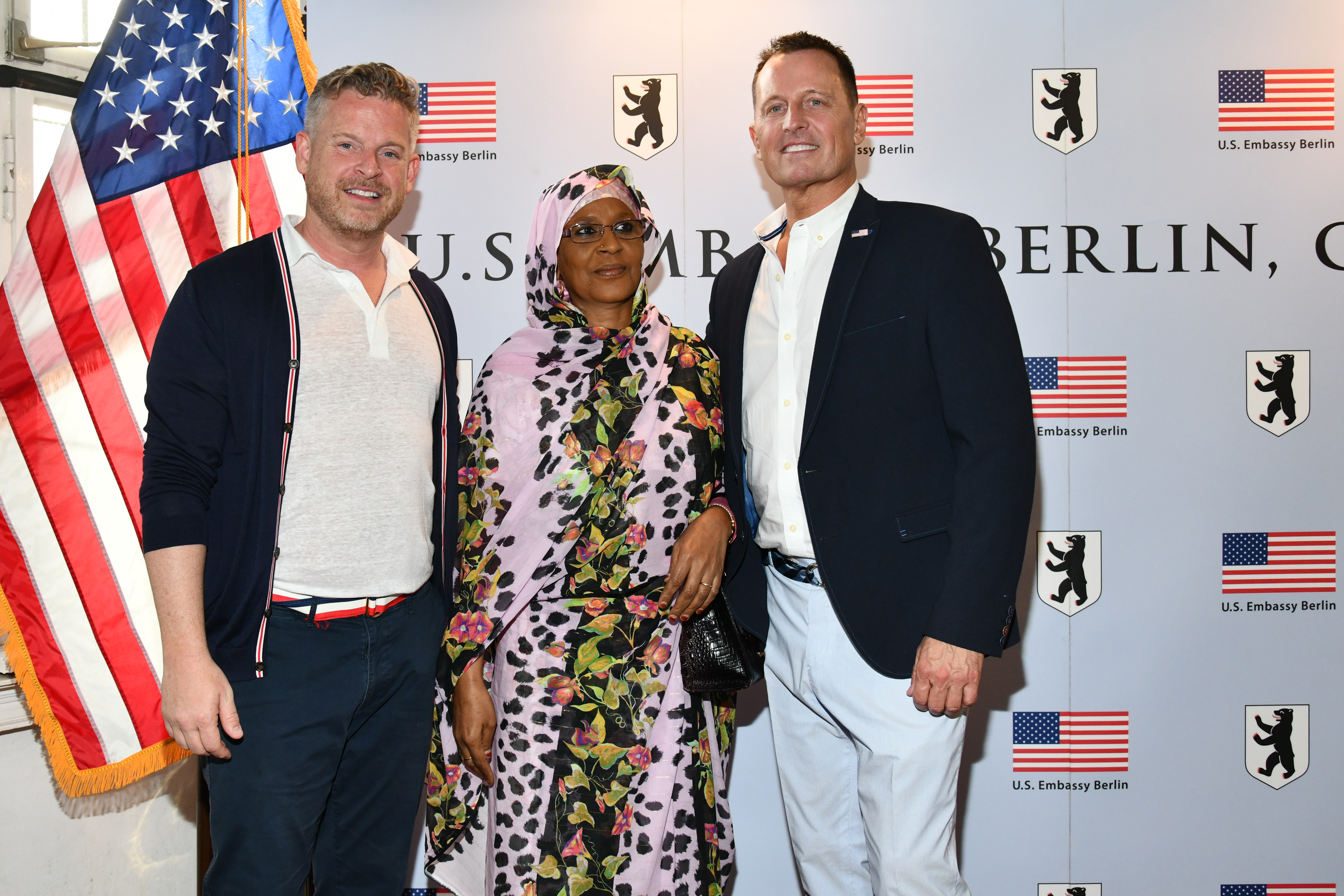
Matt Lashey, Chadian ambassador Mariam Ali Moussa and Grenell in the Berlin Embassy in 2019

Grenell's selection as a foreign policy adviser to the 2012 Romney campaign was controversial. He was criticized for "snarky" tweets about various public women and that he is openly gay. Democratic Party official Susan E. Rice described Grenell as "one of the most nasty, dishonest people I've ever encountered" and Reuters journalist Irwin Arieff described Grenell as "the most dishonest and deceptive press person I ever worked with."

A February 20, 2020, White House press release announcing the appointment of Grenell to the post of acting director of National Intelligence, stated that Grenell had "years of experience working with our Intelligence Community in a number of additional positions"; however, this assertion was disputed by others who asserted Grenell had little background in intelligence matters. Republican senator Susan Collins, one of four co-authors of the legislation creating the ODNI in 2004, said: "I care deeply about that position and believe the person needs experience in the intelligence community, which regrettably Ambassador Grenell does not have."

On the day his tenure began, it was reported that Grenell had not disclosed payments for advocacy work on behalf of Moldovan politician Vladimir Plahotniuc, who has been accused of stealing USD 1 billion from the Moldavan banking system between 2012 and 2014.

On March 10, 2020, Grenell declined to attend a congressional hearing on election security, "citing apprehension about his preparedness to address sensitive subjects that tend to upset the president."

Grenell stated in August 2020 that "President Trump is the most pro-gay president in American history. I can prove it." The Washington Post fact-checker gave his claim "Four Pinocchios" and described the claim as absurd. The fact-checker noted, "the only items Grenell can cite in support of his supposedly pro-gay record concern Grenell's own temporary appointment and a policy announced by Grenell that Trump apparently knew little about... That's pretty thin gruel on which to claim Trump is the most pro-gay president in history, especially when Trump has worked actively to undermine protections for the LGBT community that were enacted under Obama."

On November 5, 2020, Grenell appeared as a speaker of the Trump campaign press conference in North Las Vegas, pushing the local effort to overturn the presidential election Donald Trump had lost and announcing a federal lawsuit against "illegal" votes. He made allegations of fraud, claiming that non-residents and people who were long dead had voted in Nevada and accusing the state of covering up these incidents. When asked by journalists to identify himself and present evidence backing up any of his claims, Grenell refused to answer the questions and told reporters: "You're here to take in information." All the post-election lawsuits related to Nevada were later either dropped or dismissed.

Grenell sought to build support for Trump's 2024 presidential campaign among Libertarian activists and donors.

==== Senior fellow at Carnegie Mellon University ====
In June 2020, Richard Grenell was made a senior fellow at the Carnegie Mellon University's Institute for Politics and Strategy in the Dietrich College of Humanities and Social Sciences. He is to work on two projects, a report on the worldwide decriminalization of homosexuality and various campus-engagement projects about the changing face of Europe. Grenell's position as Senior Fellow is for one year and is a non-teaching position.

Grenell's appointment was controversial at the university because of his "hard-right politics", his support for President Trump's agenda, and his "apparent history of inflammatory statements." Kiron Skinner, the founding director of the Institute for Politics and Strategy, defended the hiring decision on the basis of academic freedom and diversity of thought. The university issued a report on Grenell's hiring, titled Report on the Appointment of Richard Grenell to the Carnegie Mellon University Institute for Politics and Strategy. The report found that Skinner had followed hiring mandates by consulting with the three deans of Dietrich College, the College of Engineering, and the School of Computer Science. They also found that there had been no other "senior fellow" in the institute's history, and that no other visiting scholars in the university's history had received the title of senior fellow. It also stated that "there are features of the hiring of Mr. Grenell which, to our knowledge, are unique in Carnegie Mellon's experience, and for which Carnegie Mellon does not currently have policies. As such, the determination of whether appropriate policies and procedures were used cannot be answered." The report's conclusion also stated that "Prof. Skinner followed the small set of existing policies and procedures in place in the hiring of Richard Grenell, and he began his position on July 1."

=== Special presidential envoy for special missions (2025–present) ===
On December 14, 2024, Trump named Grenell as his nominee for presidential envoy for special missions, a post that would be established by his confirmation. Grenell's first assignment in this role was to oversee the administration's response to the 2025 California wildfires.

On January 31, 2025, Grenell travelled to Caracas, Venezuela, to meet with Venezuelan president Nicolas Maduro allegedly to discuss Trump's deportation strategy for accepting undocumented immigrants. The following day, on February 1, six American prisoners in Venezuela were released. Trump announced in an unverified post on Truth Social that this arrangement was in exchange for Venezuela accepting future Venezuelan deportees from the United States. On September 1, Maduro said that Grenell and the U.S. State Department were his two lines of communication with the Trump administration. In October 2025, the Miami Herald reported that the transition of power to Delcy Rodriguez, as relayed by Grenell, had been rejected by the State Department: "A hardline faction led by Secretary of State Marco Rubio prevailed, warning that any agreement short of regime change would betray democratic principles."

In February 2025, according to the Financial Times, Richard Grenell played a key role in securing the release of Andrew Tate and his brother Tristan, two influencers prosecuted in Romania on charges of rape and human trafficking. He discussed the matter with Romanian foreign minister Emil Hurezeanu at the 61st Munich Security Conference. Grenell denied any pressure on the Romanian government.

Also in February 2025, the German tabloid Bild reported that Grenell was conducting secret negotiations with Russia in Switzerland to reopen the Nord Stream 2 pipeline. Grenell denied any involvement.

=== Kennedy Center director ===
President Trump signing Grenell, February 2025 (Grenell discussed until 3:08)

On February 10, 2025, Trump appointed Grenell as the interim Kennedy Center executive director. In April 2025, guitarist and composer Yasmin Williams emailed Grenell expressing concern about DEI rollbacks and other changes made by Trump. She stated, "These events have caused a major negative reaction in my musical community to playing at the Kennedy Center, with lots of individuals I know ultimately canceling their shows there". In his reply, Grenell stated, "Every single person who cancelled a show did so because they couldn't be in the presence of Republicans," and "I cut the DEI bullshit because we can't afford to pay people for fringe and niche programming that the public won't support". In September 2025, Grenell's office reserved seats for a group of Log Cabin Republicans who organized a disruption of Williams's performance at the center. Grenell was viewed as a "polarizing figure" at Kennedy Center. His management style fueled exits of supporters, artists and top officials including the National Symphony Orchestra's Executive Director Jean Davidson.

In March 2026, Trump announced in a social media post that Grenell would be stepping down. Grenell was replaced by Matt Floca, then Vice President of Facilities at the Kennedy Center, on March 16, 2026.

In September 2026, after the center removed Blue, a sculpture by Joel Shapiro, from its grounds, Josef Palermo, who was the center's curator of visual arts and special programming from June 2025 to March 2026, said that Grenell had summoned him to his office in 2025 and directed him to "get rid" of all the outdoor artwork on the campus, so that Trump could have an entirely new collection when the venue reopened after its planned renovations. Palermo said he did not recall Grenell singling out Blue. Grenell did not respond to a request for comment, and a person familiar with the matter disputed Palermo's account.

On October 19, 2026, Axios reported that Grenell allegedly proposed a pay-for-influence offer to a Turkish billionaire last year that included access to Trump. Axios reported that it had reviewed a text message in which Grenell allegedly outlined a pay-for-influence offer to Turkish billionaire Turhan Mildon last year, promising access to "POTUS", "VIP events", and administration officials, with Grenell reportedly writing he wanted to make Mildon the "American face down in V", referring to Venezuela. The message is part of the evidence White House counsel Will Scharf is examining in the broader dispute over roughly $5.6 million that Alina Habba Mildon—Trump’s former personal attorney and now Mildon’s wife—says her husband intended for the Kennedy Center but that never arrived, after he folded the donation into a larger $17.6 million lump-sum payment tied to a business deal involving a U.S. company, an arrangement Grenell has flatly denied, calling the allegations "absurd" and saying he never received or redirected any of Mildon’s money.

=== Private sector (2025) ===
In May 2025, Live Nation announced that Grenell had joined their board of directors. Supporters of the Justice Department's antitrust lawsuit against Live Nation–Ticketmaster suggested that the appointment was an attempt to curry favor with the Trump administration amid the conflict.

== Personal life ==
Grenell is a registered Republican. He has a longtime partner, Matt Lashey.

In June 2013, Grenell revealed that he had been diagnosed with non-Hodgkin's lymphoma and started chemotherapy. In September 2013, he announced that he was in remission.

== Awards ==
- Game Changer Award by the Log Cabin Republicans (2021)

== Honors ==
Country	Date	Honor	Ribbon	Ref.
United States	2020	National Security Medal		
Kosovo	2020	Presidential Medal of Merits		
Serbia	2023	Order of the Serbian Flag		

Diplomatic posts
Preceded by John B. Emerson	United States Ambassador to Germany; 2018–2020	Succeeded by Robin Quinville; Acting
New office	Special Presidential Envoy for Serbia and Kosovo Peace Negotiations; 2019–2021	Position abolished
Government offices
Preceded by Andrew P. Hallman; Acting	Director of National Intelligence; Acting; 2020	Succeeded by John Ratcliffe
