= Social media in the 2020 United States presidential election =

Social media was used extensively in the 2020 United States presidential election. Both incumbent president Donald Trump and Democratic Party nominee Joe Biden's campaigns employed digital-first advertising strategies, prioritizing digital advertising over print advertising in the wake of the pandemic. Trump had previously utilized his Twitter account to reach his voters and make announcements, both during and after the 2016 election. The Democratic Party nominee Joe Biden also made use of social media networks to express his views and opinions on important events such as the Trump administration's response to the COVID-19 pandemic, the protests following the murder of George Floyd, and the controversial appointment of Amy Coney Barrett to the Supreme Court.

Similar to the previous presidential election, social media helped shape the course of events, with candidates often hunting for 'viral moments'. These could include certain posts, remarks or videos. Social media contributed to the spread of media power during the 2020 presidential election by giving a larger number of individuals and groups the chance to have a say in discussions and debates and add to the public narrative. This led to a larger quantity of diversified news content and viewpoints available to audiences all over the country during the election.

Data from a research carried out by Pew Research Centre shows that social media platforms such as Facebook and Twitter are a primary source of information for approximately two thirds of the American population. These platforms are slowly becoming more relevant news sources than long-established, customary forms of media like print and radio. Social media provides citizens with details on recent events and allows for political engagement. Social media platforms like Twitter and Facebook let users publicly support their candidate of choice and interact with other partisans by joining online communities and taking part in virtual events. Data from Socialbakers shows that 72% of American electorates are active on at least one social media platform, and 69% of those citizens only have an online presence on Facebook.

In contrast to the previous election, the Facebook–Cambridge Analytical data scandal that was exposed after Donald Trump's electoral victory in 2016 led to tighter regulation on the harvesting of personal data for political advertising. Additionally, many platforms enforced stricter rules on the content that was being posted, and also incorporated fact checking software into their applications. The software repeatedly flagged Republican candidate Donald Trump's posts, which led him to accuse social media companies of bias against his campaign.

== Background ==
In the 2016 presidential election, Donald Trump made extensive use of his Twitter account to broadcast his thoughts and opinions during his campaign. The Trump campaign also utilized targeted advertising on the social media site Facebook, by hiring political consulting firm Cambridge Analytica to create these personalized ads for users. A subsequent whistle-blowing by an anonymous source, (later revealed to be former Cambridge Analytica employee Christopher Wylie) revealed that personal data of the users had been illegally used, which led to a major data scandal and the liquidation of the company, as well as the eventually testification of Facebook CEO Mark Zuckerberg in front of the United States Congress.

Joe Biden, the Democratic Party nominee for 2020, had not made much use of social media in the past, but used portions of his campaign budget to run advertising on certain platforms, most notably Facebook, where he is estimated to have spent up to $1.6 million on advertising leading up to the California Democratic primary.

== Democratic primaries ==
With over 23 candidates in the 2020 Democratic Party presidential primaries, attracting and generating social media attention became a central campaign strategy and a significant focus of campaign fundraising, due to the ongoing rise of social media platforms such as Instagram, Facebook and Twitter.

With the new centrality of social media to presidential campaigns, staff attention also had to be focused on managing negative viral moments.

In the summer of 2019, the selection process of qualifying for the September 2019 2020 Democratic Party presidential debates and forums, which required candidates to have passed a 2% threshold in 4 national opinion polls, put enormous pressure on the less well-known candidates to generate a "viral moment".

Reddit became an important social media platform in the primaries, with most major candidates having their own 'subreddits', or dedicated community noticeboards. The largest of these was 'r/SandersForPresident', which accumulated nearly 500,000 followers before candidate Senator Bernie Sanders dropped out of the primaries. Bernie Sanders amounted a wide range of social media supporters not only from Reddit, but from Instagram, Twitter and various other platforms. His Twitter following was most significant, and at the time of the election amassed over 10 million followers, which was more than most of his competitor's followings combined. Bernie was able to raise $100 million through his social media supporters and untraditional methods of fundraising supported by his loyal fan base, dubbed 'Bernie Bros'.

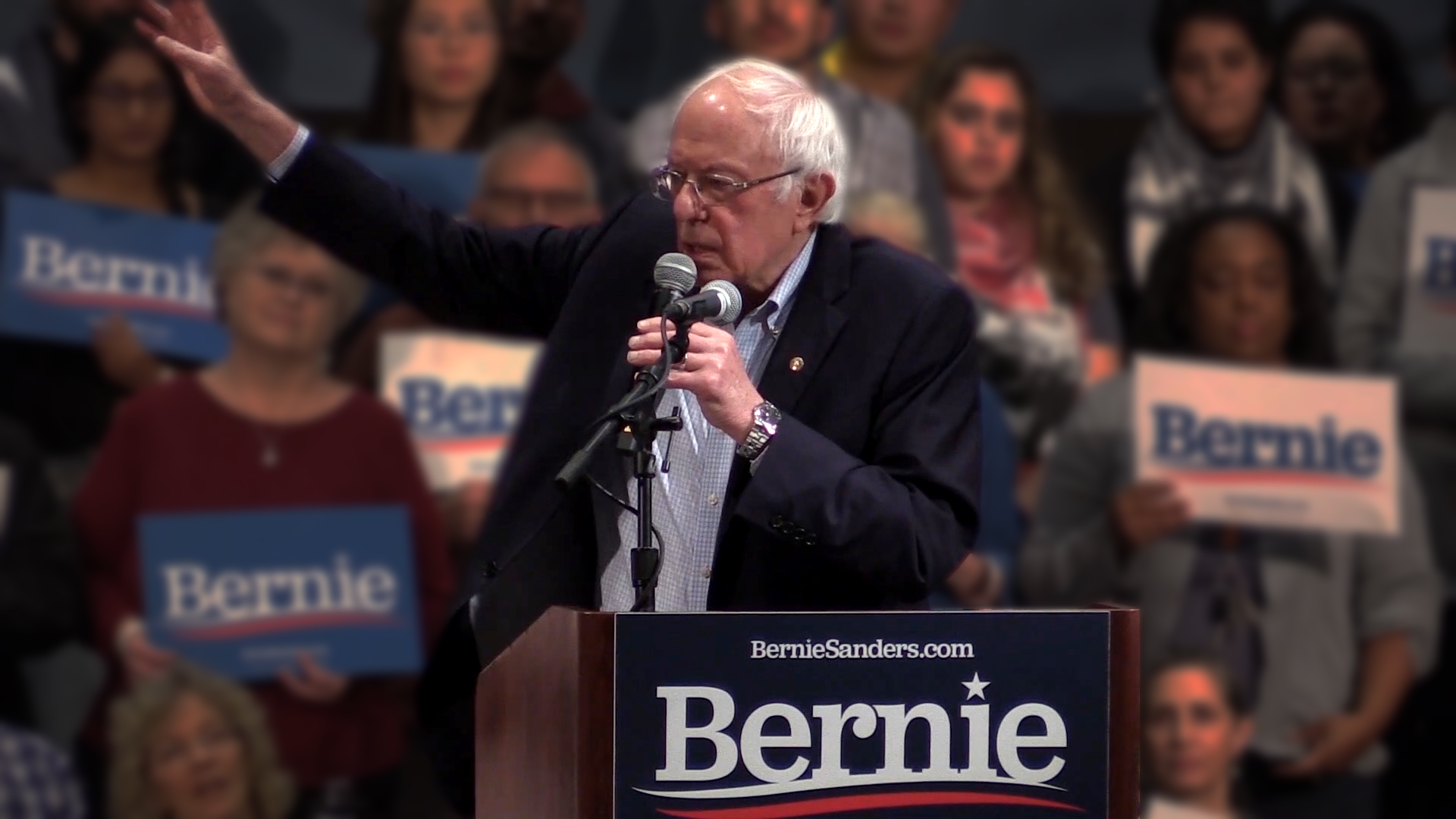
Bernie Sanders waving to his supporters, 'Bernie Bros'

The Bernie Bros ended up facing backlash from the candidate throughout the election as there were multiple instances of the fan base harassing individuals who disagreed with Sanders. Most notably, a situation where union leaders in Nevada found issue with Bernie's Medicare policies, prompting the Bernie Bros to leak the women's phone numbers, home addresses and personal information online. Democratic primaries candidate Elizabeth Warren then called on Sanders to take action against this form of extremity and was met with his supporters flooding her social media pages with snake emojis and harsh comments as a form of retaliation. Sanders stood firmly against this form of harassment, and called on his supporters publicly to put a stop to this negativity indefinitely.

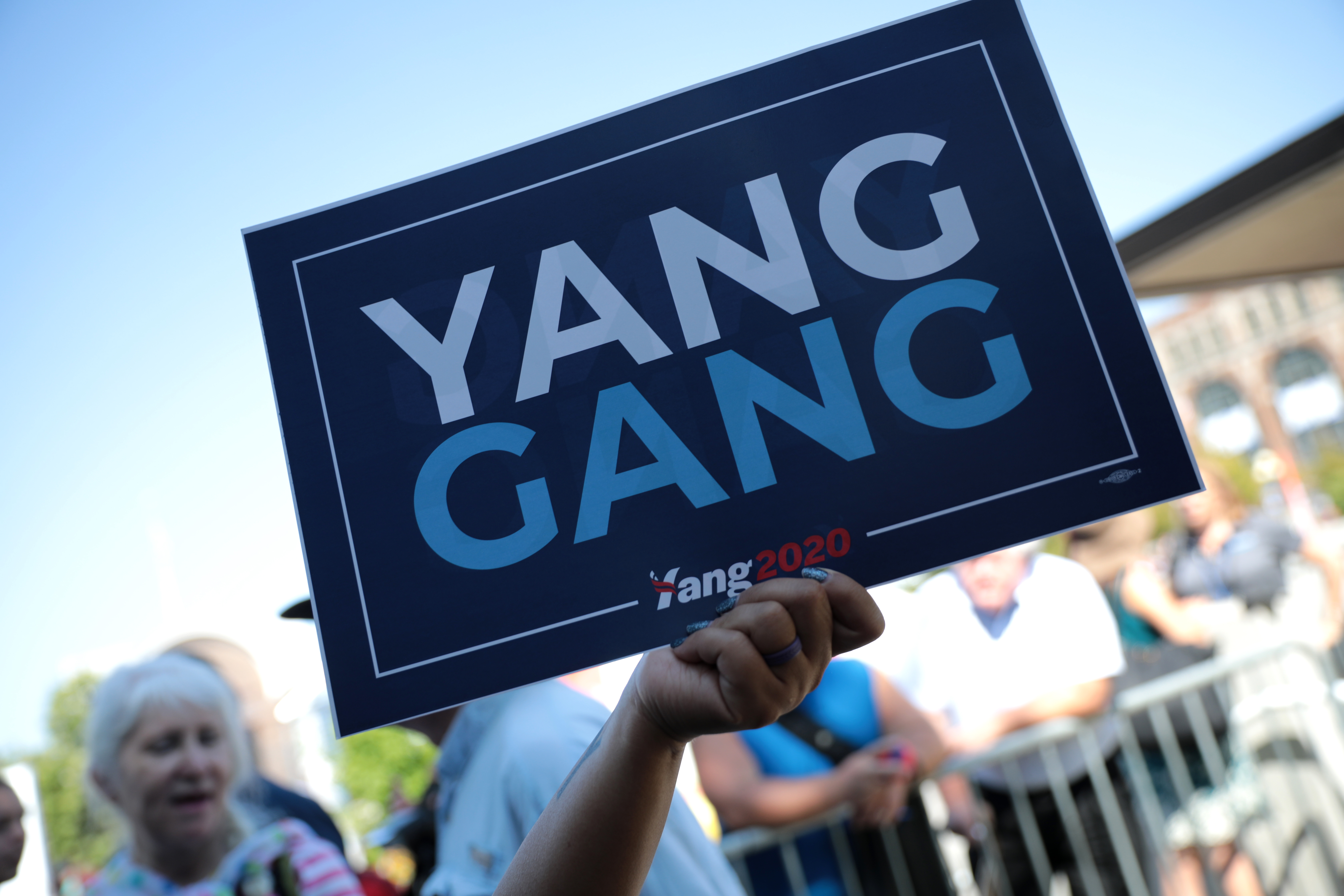
Andrew Yang's tagline

During the primaries, candidate Andrew Yang also made extensive use of social media, which greatly increased his following. Yang increased his social media presence in rather unconventional ways, given his party alignment. The presidential candidate appeared on the Joe Rogan Show and Tucker Carlson's late night show segment, right-leaning programs. His self-proclaimed voter base the 'Yang Gang' became the subject of many internet memes, particularly on the online message board 4chan.

== Joe Biden campaign ==
Similar to his Republican party opponent, Donald Trump, Joe Biden made extensive use of Twitter to broadcast news of his campaign, as well as his opinions on various policies and his proposed changes. Biden used the platform to publicly announce California senator Kamala Harris as his running mate, and also to talk to her publicly. Biden also made use of the app TikTok to reach out to teen audiences and promote his campaign by establishing a paid partnership with a group of creators under the name of TikTok for Biden.

Biden's team made use of learning from Hillary Clinton's mistakes during her presidential campaign in 2016. Biden's campaign used digital ads and television presence to target swing states. Biden made use of online campaigns, seldom making public appearances due to the emergent pandemic at the time. Biden was aware of the importance of social media presence to voter turnout. Biden used digital advertising to send out messages of unity and strength in the midst of the pandemic, bringing electorates a sense of comfort during the global crisis.

== Donald Trump campaign ==
The Trump campaign made considerable use of social media in the 2016 presidential election, and continued to do so in 2020. Trump used the online platform Twitter to broadcast opinions and news on his campaign to his supporters in a provocative and attention-grabbing manner, and his campaign staff created personalized advertisements for Facebook users. The personal data used to create these ads was obtained illegally, something which led to the Facebook–Cambridge Analytica data scandal. Trump's re-election campaign has been making use of use of multiple social media platforms as well as targeted ads since mid-2019 in an attempt to gain voters early. On 29 June 2020, Reddit deleted Trump's fans' subreddit, r/The_Donald, for violating its policies repeatedly over its lifetime. Trump and his supporters used social media platforms - especially Twitter - to criticize and spread disinformation about his opponents and the validity of the election.

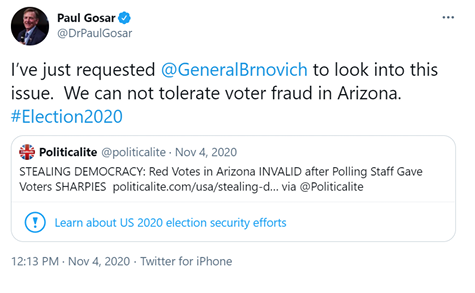
Tweet claiming election fraud by a prominent Republican congressperson.

Trump originally downplayed the seriousness of COVID-19, hosting a rally in Tulsa, Oklahoma on June 20, 2020, to promote his campaign despite the emergent pandemic crisis. Most tickets were bought by TikTok users and K-Pop fans to protest his candidacy, and many seats remained empty. Six staff members tested positive for coronavirus following the event.

Leading up to and following the election itself, social media was an important medium to spread disinformation about the election by both Trump and his supporters. Further, numerous republican congress people and Trump supporters used Twitter and Facebook to disseminate ideas that the election had been fraudulent.

== Third-party candidates ==
The 2020 presidential election proved to be a time for third-party candidates to make their social media presence known online in addition to the traditional Democratic or Republican nominees.

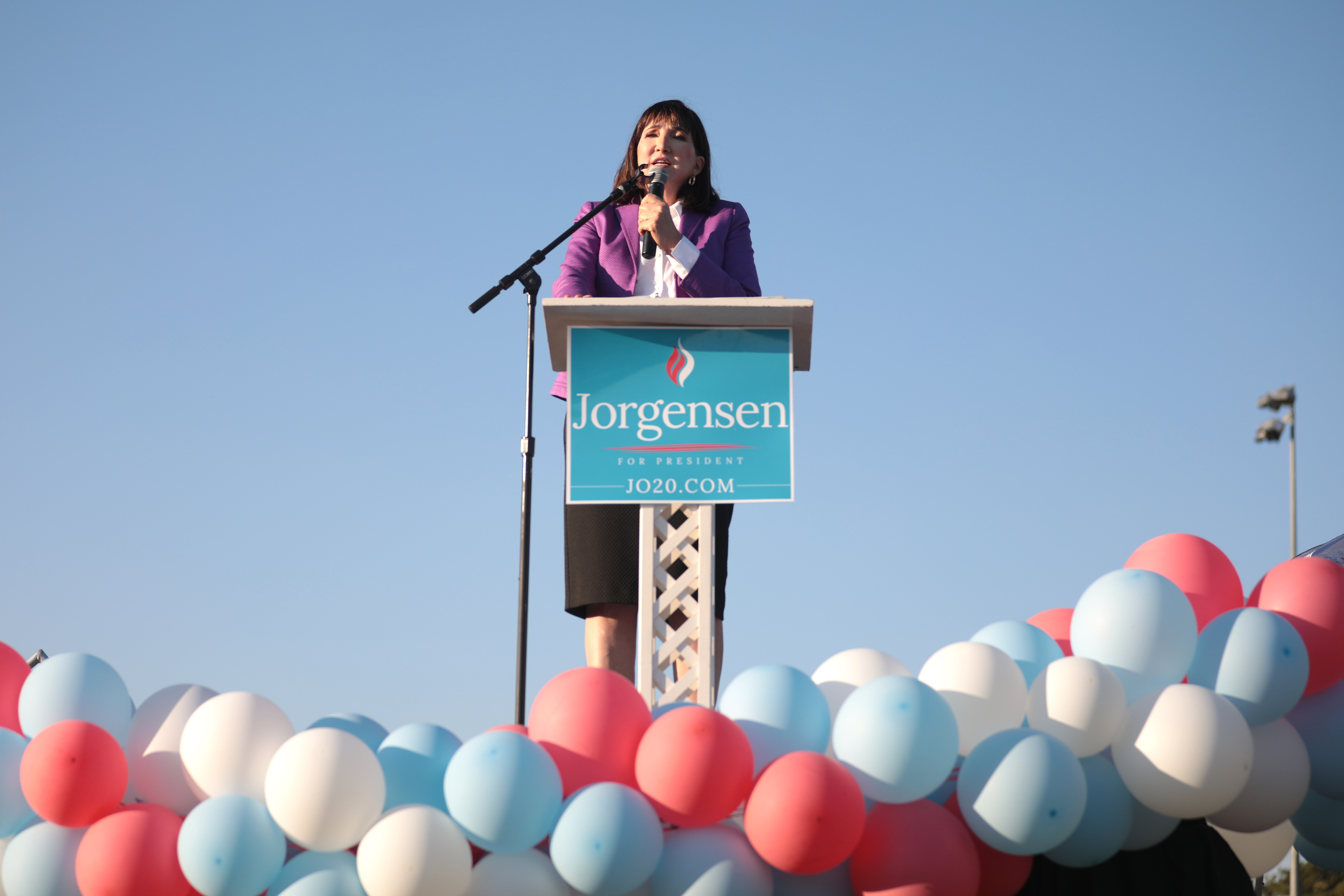
Third-party candidate Jo Jorgensen speaking at a rally, before promoting her 'Let Her Speak' message

Front runner of the third party race, libertarian Jo Jorgensen's most prominent social media moment was her announcement that she was going to cancel her 'Let Her Speak' rally after being bitten by a bat. Jo's 'Let Her Speak' rally and movement gained traction online as she wanted a place in the presidential debates next to Trump and Biden after securing her spot on the ballots of all fifty states.

With Twitter being the prominent form of his communication, Kanye West's surprising election announcement was made through a tweet on July 5, 2020, where he wrote "We must now realize the promise of America by trusting God, unifying our vision and building our future. I am running for president of the United States 🇺🇸! #2020VISION" Many flocked to his support such as business man Elon Musk, and numerous online supporters of 'The Birthday Party', his newly established platform. The rapper claimed he also wanted to make the White House similar to Black Panther's Wakanda, among other goals. West's announcement and lack of seriousness caused many to question the legitimacy of his campaign, yet he still garnered 60,000 votes total.

Green Party candidate Howie Hawkins spoke about West's announcement and cleared on social media that their intentions as third-party candidates are nowhere near similar. Hawkins even commented in an interview that the announcement is a "Republican dirty trick". Hawkins currently holds a platform on Twitter with 56,500 followers and has won the Green Party nomination previously in 2010, 2014, and 2018.

== Facebook ==
In December 2019, the Wall Street Journal reported that Sanders and Trump were the most active on Facebook, followed by Massachusetts Senator Elizabeth Warren.

Incumbent president Trump had already built a vast online presence on Facebook with around 29 million followers at the time of the election while Biden's follower count reached only 2.8 million.

== Twitter ==
Donald Trump has been criticized for his false and misleading statements, which have repeatedly been flagged by Twitter for violating its policies. On Thursday, March 5, 2020, Twitter released new features said to act against the spread of disinformation surrounding the 2020 election, including a new policy that attempts to flag misleading media. Twitter defines misleading media as synthetic, manipulated, or out-of-context content that may deceive or confuse users and lead to the spread of misconceptions. As a way to counter the spread of disinformation, Twitter warns users that they may label Tweets with a blue exclamation point and the words “manipulated media” underneath the Tweet if the platform believes the content shared is either deceptively altered, manipulated, fabricated, or being shared under a false context. Content such as deepfakes and cheap fakes fall under the category of misleading content under this new regulation. Twitter also states that they may show a warning to those who attempt to share the flagged content. According to Twitter's then head of site integrity Yoel Roth, moderators are looking out for evidence of alteration to content causing a change to its meaning. Twitter claims content will be removed if there is evidence of significant changes to the content to the extent that it could have a harmful impact on users or hinder public safety.

A Pew survey of 3518 twitter users in 2020 shows that the most active 10% generate 92% of the tweets. This highly active group is 69% Democratic and 26% Republican. Furthermore, the high-activity Democrats post twice as many posts per month as high-activity Republicans.

Biden surpassed Trump in many key metrics during the 2020 presidential election. Despite Biden having a lower follower count, 11 million followers at the time of Socialbakers's data analysis, his top three tweets have almost double the interactions that Trump, who had 87 million followers at the time of the election, received on his top three tweets.

== Influencer impact ==
Influencers have the ability to influence views on things such as products, brands, and political candidates. Influencers' voices are being utilized more and more in politics with the rise of social media. The 2020 United States presidential election is the first American presidential election that relied heavily on influencers' platforms to reach young voters. This is largely because 72% of citizens who are of voting age use social media and receive their political education from these platforms. Many young influencers were vocal about their support for Biden in the 2020 presidential election. Between October 21 and October 23 of 2020 there were 6.6 million mentions of Trump and Biden on social media, 72% of those mentions belonging to Biden. Influencers who supported opposing parties were not as vocal due to the polarizing nature of their views and its possible impact on brand deals and support from their audiences. Data from The Marketing Institute shows that 70% of teens trust influencers more than traditional celebrities while 49% of consumers rely on influencer advice and suggestions. Due to their large impact on consumer decisions, influencers have gained the power to sway voting decisions in the past few years. Influencers and brands used their power to sway and encourage their audience to support a specific political candidate. YouTuber David Dobrik incentivized his viewers to vote by organizing a car giveaway which those who voted were registered into. YouTubers, the Try Guys, had made a YouTube video endorsing Joe Biden for the 2020 election. President Trump threatened to shut TikTok down due to its impact on the 2020 election. It was a way for both parties to connect to young viewers and there were even "Hype Houses" created for both parties.

== TikTok ==
A space normally meant for entertainment, TikTok turned into a political zone during the 2020 election where users would post about their political views and beliefs. The rise of the platform within Generation Z gave a central space for candidates on all sides to promote their campaign to the youths. Accounts such as @tiktokforbiden gained hundreds of thousands of followers due to their platform being a place where creators could make videos about their political views. Political hype houses like @conservativehypehouse, @TikTokrepublicans, and @libralhypehouse have also sprung up that are dedicated to content about the election. Though the political contents on TikTok range from the far left to the far right, the platform is still thought to be left-leaning since left-leaning accounts like @tiktokforbiden gains around 100,000 views and 50,000 likes on their videos while right-leaning accounts like @conservativehypehouse gains around 75,000 views and 20,000 likes on their videos.

The influence of TikTok and other social media platforms are argued to have an influence on the voter turnout on Generation Z. Compared to the 2016 election, the 2020 election voter turnout for ages 18 to 29 rose by 8 points.

== See also ==
- Foreign interference in the 2020 United States elections
- Social media in the 2016 United States presidential election
