= Information laundering =

Propaganda tactic

An illustration of the words ‘fake news’ appearing in newsprint.

Information laundering, narrative laundering or disinformation laundering is the surfacing of news, false, AI written or otherwise, from unverified sources into the mainstream. By advancing disinformation to make it accepted as legitimate information, information laundering resembles money laundering—the transforming of illicit funds into legitimate funds. Information laundering is often described as part of a state's propaganda and information warfare toolkit and it increasingly relies on generative AI.

== Descriptions ==
Information laundering, as summarized by American comedian and commentator Jon Stewart, can happen when relatively reputable news organizations report on something that a blog or platform of unknown credibility has written. These news organizations may attribute the assertion, but another publication may omit its original source. "That piece of information [on where the news came from] has now been laundered," Stewart says, and the original assertion, whether or not its source was credible, gains credibility, especially if it is used by outlets known for high standards.

Pace University's Adam Klein, who developed the theory, argues that information laundering is similar to how criminals launder illegal funds into financial institutions. In the case of information laundering, illegitimate exchanges of information flow through social networks, political blogs, and search engines, where they intermix with mainstream ideas, and gradually become washed of their radical origins. According to Klein, "[c]onspiracies grow in communities like Reddit or Twitter, which can act as incubators. Then they graduate onto more respected websites and political blogs, until sometimes, they're picked up by mainstream news outlets as 'trusted information'."

Digital platforms can be especially vulnerable to information laundering efforts; faked videos (deepfakes) and images (photograph manipulation), for instance, can create media moments and spread disinformation. According to Karen Kornbluh, director of the German Marshall Fund's Digital Innovation Democracy initiative, and Ellen Goodman, director of the Rutgers Institute for Information Policy & Law, bots, fake accounts and click farms "pretend to be people they're not and create a false sense of consensus", and commercial platforms, "designed to keep users online to be served ads, end up privileging engagement over truth or the public interest. What drives engagement is often outrage and disgust, so this is what the algorithm rewards."

According to a report by NATO in 2020, state actors that engage in information laundering, particularly Russia, "are generally supported by cyber capabilities that enhance the spread and amplification of a laundered piece, e.g. through the creation of fake personas and burner accounts, and sophisticated for manipulation of information, e.g. through the distribution of forged letters."

According to a 2025 report by Graphika, artificial intelligence is used to launder articles from Chinese state media such as China Global Television Network (CGTN) through various social media sites in an attempt to disguise the articles' origin. CGTN affiliates have registered multiple seemingly-authentic websites that used generative AI to translate CGTN content into local languages without any indication of their origin. The EU's East StratCom Task Force also described this tactic as information laundering.

== Examples ==
In 2013, WikiLeaks, which publishes secret information from anonymous sources, was said in a commentary by Jonathan Holmes on ABC Australia to be information laundering.

Information laundering was alleged in the spreading of false news by social media in the 2018 Mexican election.

American intelligence officials say China and Russia have used information laundering to spread disinformation in the West about the COVID-19 pandemic and the 2020 elections in the United States. The Russian effort has included a network of fake accounts on social media. Russian propaganda using information laundering is also suspected in stoking fears about 5G technology. The Alliance for Securing Democracy, an American group that opposes Russian efforts to undermine Western elections, cites maskirovka, a Soviet-era military doctrine that translates as 'mask' or 'masquerade', as a precursor to Russian information laundering. Despite bans in multiple countries, content from Russian state media outlets such as RT and Sputnik continues to be laundered through third-party sites.

Local "Save the Children" rallies in 2020 by supporters of QAnon, an American far-right conspiracy theory, were an example of information laundering, as QAnon hijacked a unifying cause in attempts to attract credulous local television news coverage, according to Brandy Zadrozny of NBC News.

According to The Economist, the Independent Online of South Africa "often engages in 'information laundering' designed to make sentiment appear homegrown, says Herman Wasserman at the University of Cape Town. For instance, it will run a Chinese news-agency story on the biolab conspiracy, then get a left-wing student leader to write an article expressing concern about the supposed biolabs. Chinese news agencies will use that to write about how South Africans are worried, thus manufacturing a 'story' out of nothing at all."

In 2023, the United States Department of State accused the Chinese government of information laundering by using "manufactured personas" such as a fictitious opinion columnist named "Yi Fan" to present state narratives as "organic sentiment".

== Detection ==
In 2024, the Alliance for Securing Democracy, the University of Amsterdam, and the Institute for Strategic Dialogue jointly released an open-source tool for uncovering websites republishing content from Russian state media.

== Similar phrases ==
=== Idea laundering ===
The phrase "idea laundering" was used by journalist Nicholas Confessore in a 2003 article in Washington Monthly about Tech Central Station and its links to corporate lobbying. A section of the article was titled "The Rise of Idea Laundering". Confessore described efforts by corporate interests to influence arguments coming from sources regarded as independent, including think tanks, academics, the media and grassroots organizations, and wrote that a journalist willing to "launder the arguments of corporations and trade groups" could make the same arguments more influential by presenting them through an apparently independent source.

In 2006, St. Petersburg Times journalist Bill Adair described corporations paying apparently independent groups to promote their positions as "a form of idea laundering". In 2015, investigative journalist Till Bruckner used the term in reporting on Azerbaijani lobbying in the United States. The Organized Crime and Corruption Reporting Project described Bruckner's use of "idea laundering" as "filtering propaganda through apparently legitimate organizations and spokespeople" so that it appears to be reliable, independent information.

The phrase has also described how academicians may advance non-scientific ideas as knowledge or fact. A 2020 paper used the phrase "idea laundering" to describe plagiarism "in which ideas are plagiarized and then the plagiarism is hidden in plain sight". A similar phrase, idea laundering, has described how academicians may advance non-scientific ideas as knowledge or fact. A 2020 paper used the phrase idea laundering to describe plagiarism "in which ideas are plagiarized and then the plagiarism is hidden in plain sight".

=== Citation laundering ===
Similarly, citation laundering is a colloquial term used to refer to a number of practices including:

- Hiding a self-citation by citing someone who has referenced one's own work. (Sometimes also called "stealth citation". Individual self-citation is not to be confused with journal self-citation, commonly known as coercive citation.)
- Citing a number of more recent works that ultimately all pull their information from one flawed source. This can be intentional disinformation or an accidental lack of rigor.

Self-citation practices are usually done with the intent of increasing a scholar's research impact in terms of metrics such as the h-index; groups of scholars can form "citation farms" or "citation cartels" to aggrandize each other's work. Self- or co-citation in this way can also contribute to information laundering as it increases the seeming authority of a claim without rigorously investigating its source.

== Machine learning definition ==
In adversarial machine learning, information laundering refers to a general strategy that purposely alters the information released to adversaries, with the goal of alleviating model stealing attacks.

== See also ==
- Trading up the chain
- Astroturfing
- Circular reporting or "citogenesis"
  - Wikipedia:List of citogenesis incidents
