= Matt Floca =

American facilities manager (born 1986)

President and Executive Director of the John F. Kennedy Center for the Performing Arts
- Acting
- Assumed office March 16, 2026
- Preceded by: Richard Grenell

Personal details
- Born: Charles Matthew Floca; December 1986 (age 39)
- Education: Louisiana State University (BS)

Charles Matthew Floca (born December 1986) is an American facilities manager who has served as the acting president and executive director of the Kennedy Center since 2026. He served as the vice president of facilities at the Kennedy Center from 2024 to 2026.

== Early life and education (1986–2009) ==
Charles Matthew Floca was born in December 1986. He graduated from Louisiana State University with a Bachelor of Science degree in construction management in 2009.

== Career ==
=== Government of the District of Columbia (2013–2024) ===
By 2024, Floca had served as the associate director of sustainability and the director of facilities management for the government of the District of Columbia.

=== Kennedy Center (2024–present) ===
In January 2024, Floca became the vice president of facilities at the Kennedy Center. He oversaw the use of funding allocated to the center in the One Big Beautiful Bill Act, including redoing the seats in the opera house, replacing rigging equipment, and installing new chillers and boilers. Floca additionally gave president Donald Trump a tour of the Kennedy Center. Trump provided suggestions for renovating the building to Floca, with whom he developed a relationship. In March 2026, Axios reported that Floca would succeed Richard Grenell as the center's executive director and chief executive. Trump publicly announced the move on March 13, praising Floca. The Kennedy Center's board of trustees voted to close the center for two years and appoint Floca as its president and executive director on March 16.

In September 2026, The New York Times, reported that anonymous former employees said Floca canceled a roof repair project in April 2026 prior to a September storm where a section of the ceiling collapsed. Floca disputed the allegations, saying that during the summer, an investigation revealed that more extensive repair work was required.
