= Shelby Pierson =

US intelligence official (circa mid-1990s– )

Chair of the Election Executive and Leadership Board
- Incumbent
- Assumed office July 2019
- President: Donald Trump
- Appointed by: Director of National Intelligence

Shelby Pierson is a U.S. intelligence officer and the former top election security official of the American intelligence community, the chair of the Election Executive and Leadership Board. Director of National Intelligence Dan Coats instituted the position and appointed Pierson to fill it in July 2019. The board includes representatives from the intelligence community and other federal agencies coordinating on election security.

== Intelligence career ==
Pierson was crisis manager for election security during the 2018 midterm elections.

She has more than 20 years of intelligence experience, including as national intelligence manager for Russia, Europe and Eurasia, and roles at the National Geospatial-Intelligence Agency.

On August 19, 2025, Pierson was among 37 current and former officials to have their security clearances revoked by the Trump administration. Director of National Intelligence Tulsi Gabbard accused the group of malfeasance without providing evidence. According to The Economist, Pierson was "[one] of the most senior serving career intelligence officials to be purged under Mr Trump," and the purge marked "a sharp escalation in his war on American spooks."

== 2020 election security coordinator ==
Pierson told NPR in January 2020 that election interference "isn't a Russia-only problem" and that "we're still also concerned about China, Iran, non-state actors, 'hacktivists.' And frankly ... even Americans might be looking to undermine confidence in the elections." She said the Russians "are already engaging in influence operations" but "we do not have evidence at this time that our adversaries are directly looking at interfering with vote counts."

To deter election interference, "it's important for us to keep messaging our adversaries that this activity will not be tolerated and there will be consequences," she told NBC News.

=== Russian interference warning ===
Pierson told the House Intelligence Committee on February 13, 2020, that Russia is working to help get Donald Trump re-elected. Later, three other national security officials told CNN that this statement omitted important nuance, and that while Russia was working to interfere with the election, there was not evidence the interference was aimed at re-electing Trump.

The day afterward, Trump berated her supervisor, acting director of national intelligence Joseph Maguire, for allowing the briefing. Trump worried that Democrats might "weaponize" the information against him. On February 19, 2020, Trump replaced Maguire with Richard Grenell, considered a Trump loyalist, as acting director of national intelligence, effective immediately.

== See also ==
- Foreign interference in the 2020 United States elections
- Timeline of the 2020 United States presidential election
- Trump–Ukraine scandal
