= Post-election lawsuits related to the 2020 U.S. presidential election from Nevada =

The Donald Trump 2020 presidential campaign launched numerous lawsuits contesting the election processes of Nevada. Many of the processes contested were created due to the COVID-19 pandemic. All of these were either dismissed or dropped.

== Summary of lawsuits ==
Nevada post-election lawsuits related to the 2020 United States presidential election
First filing date	Case	Court	Docket no(s).	Outcome	Comments	References
November 5, 2020	Stokke v. Cegavske	Nevada District Court	2:20-CV-02046-APG-DJA	Dropped		
November 16, 2020	Marchant v. Gloria	Nevada District Court, Clark County	A-20-824884-W	Dismissed		
November 16, 2020	Election Integrity Project of Nevada v. Nevada	Nevada District Court, Clark County	A-20-820510-C	Dismissed		
November 16, 2020	Becker v. Gloria	Nevada District Court, Clark County	A-20-824878-W	Dismissed	Republican state senate candidate challenged use of software to verify signatures on mail-in ballots. Dismissed without prejudice.	
November 17, 2020	Law v. Whitmer	Nevada Supreme Court Nevada District Court, Carson City	82178 (NV Supreme Ct.) 20 OC 0163 1B (District Ct.)	Dismissed	Republican candidates for presidential electors contesting election. Dismissed with prejudice and affirmed on appeal.	
November 19, 2020	Rodimer v. Gloria	Nevada District Court, Clark County	A-20-825130-W	Dismissed	Republican state senate candidate seeking a new election. Dismissed.	
November 19, 2020	Becker v. Cannizzaro	Nevada District Court, Clark County	A-20-825067-P	Dropped		

== Becker v. Cannizzaro ==
On November 19, 2020, Republican state senate candidate April Becker filed a lawsuit against the Democratic incumbent, Nicole Cannizzaro, asking for a new election to be held. Becker challenged the use of processing machines to tabulate mail-in ballots. Plaintiffs voluntarily dismissed the suit the following day.

== Becker v. Gloria ==
On November 16, 2020, Republican state senate candidate April Becker filed a lawsuit in state court against the Clark County Registrar of Voters, Joseph P. Gloria, asking for a new election to be held. Becker challenged the mailing of ballots to all registered voters and the use of automated software Agilis to verify signatures, arguing that state law requires human review of the signatures. On November 24, the court denied the plaintiff's request without prejudice.

== Election Integrity Project of Nevada v. Nevada ==
On November 16, 2020, the Election Integrity Project of Nevada filed a lawsuit against the state of Nevada, claiming to have found "extensive evidence" of voter fraud. The group asked for the election results to be invalidated and a new election to be ordered. On November 20, Clark County District Court Judge Gloria Sturman denied the request, calling it a "shocking ask".

== Law v. Whitmer ==
The Nevada Republican Party and the Trump campaign filed Law v. Whitmer on November 17, 2020, in the Nevada First Judicial District Court in Carson City. The six electors pledged to Biden are named as defendants, and the lawsuit asks to either pledge all six electors to Trump or else to annul the election results. The lawsuit uses "many of the same claims already rejected by local courts in previous lawsuits, including improper use of a signature verification machine and unfair observation rules", according to the Las Vegas Review-Journal.

On November 25, a judge allowed the Trump campaign to present its evidence of fraud in the election. The judge set the hearing for December 3, allowing 15 depositions. On December 4, the court denied the plaintiff's request, saying "Contestants did not prove under any standard of proof that any illegal votes were cast and counted, or legal votes were not counted at all, for any other improper or illegal reason, nor in an amount equal to or greater than 33,596, or otherwise in an amount sufficient to raise reasonable doubt as to the outcome of the election".

On December 8, the Supreme Court of Nevada unanimously affirmed the District Court's ruling, writing: "We...are not convinced that the district court erred in applying a burden of proof by clear and convincing evidence, as supported by the cases cited in the district court's order."

== Marchant v. Gloria ==
On November 16, 2020, Jim Marchant filed a lawsuit against Clark County Registrar of Voters, Joseph P. Gloria, asking for a new election to be held. Marchant, a Republican congressional candidate, lost his bid against Democratic incumbent Steven Horsford. Marchant claimed signatures were verified using a computer system, whereas Nevada state law requires signature verification to be conducted by humans. On November 23, Clark County District Court Judge Gloria Sturman dismissed the case, citing jurisdictional issues.

== Rodimer v. Gloria ==
On November 19, 2020, Dan Rodimer filed a lawsuit in state court against the Clark County Registrar of Voters, Joseph P. Gloria, asking for a new election to be held. Rodimer, a congressional candidate who lost to Democratic Representative Susie Lee, claimed signatures on mail-in ballots were verified using a computer system whereas Nevada state law requires signature verification to be conducted by humans. The case was assigned to Clark County District Court Judge Gloria Sturman; the plaintiffs filed two motions asking Judge Sturman to recuse herself from the case, alleging that her connections to the Democratic party "rendered her too biased to preside over the case." Chief Judge Linda Marie Bell reassigned the case, but noted that "nothing in the record reflects a prejudice on the part of Judge Sturman against Mr. Rodimer that would preclude Judge Sturman from deciding this case." This lawsuit was filed by attorney Craig Mueller, who filed similar actions for losing Republican candidates. At a hearing on November 25, Judge Trevor Atkin dismissed the case, citing the court's lack of jurisdiction and format issues.

== Stokke v. Cegavske ==
On November 5, 2020, plaintiffs Jill Stokke, Chris Prudhome, Marchant for Congress, and Rodimer for Congress sued Secretary of State Barbara Cegavske and Clark County Registrar of Voters Joseph P. Gloria for illegal conduct. The initial complaint, filed in the United States District Court for the District of Nevada on November 5, 2020, accused the defendants of "illegal conduct" across three counts, including "violations of the Elections Clause", violations of Equal Protection Clause (enforceable under 18 U.S.C. § 1983), and the "violation of Nev. Rev. Stat. §§ 293.8881 and 293.363" respectively. The complaint cited irregularities in "over 3,000 instances of ineligible individuals casting ballots".

On November 5, 2020, attorneys for the plaintiffs filed a motion for an emergency temporary restraining order and preliminary injunction barring defendants from violating Nevada law, the Elections Clauses, and the Equal Protection Clause of the Constitution, listing 14 counts, including the use of signature-verification software Agilis in Clark County.

The case was dropped by the plaintiffs on November 30, 2020.
