= Trading up the chain =

Marketing and propaganda tactic

Trading up the chain is a marketing and propaganda tactic of deliberately inducing circular reporting, by seeding a message or claim in a less-credible medium, with the intent of it being quoted and repeated by publications (or people) who appeal to a wider audience. Those more-authoritative sources are then cited, to build up the message's credibility and publicize it further. Trading up the chain can be a tactic for disinformation and media manipulation.

The term was publicized by the author and marketer Ryan Holiday, who described its use in marketing and politics.

== See also ==
- Information laundering
- Argument from authority
- Disinformation
- Astroturfing
