= Yehudah Teichtal =

American rabbi

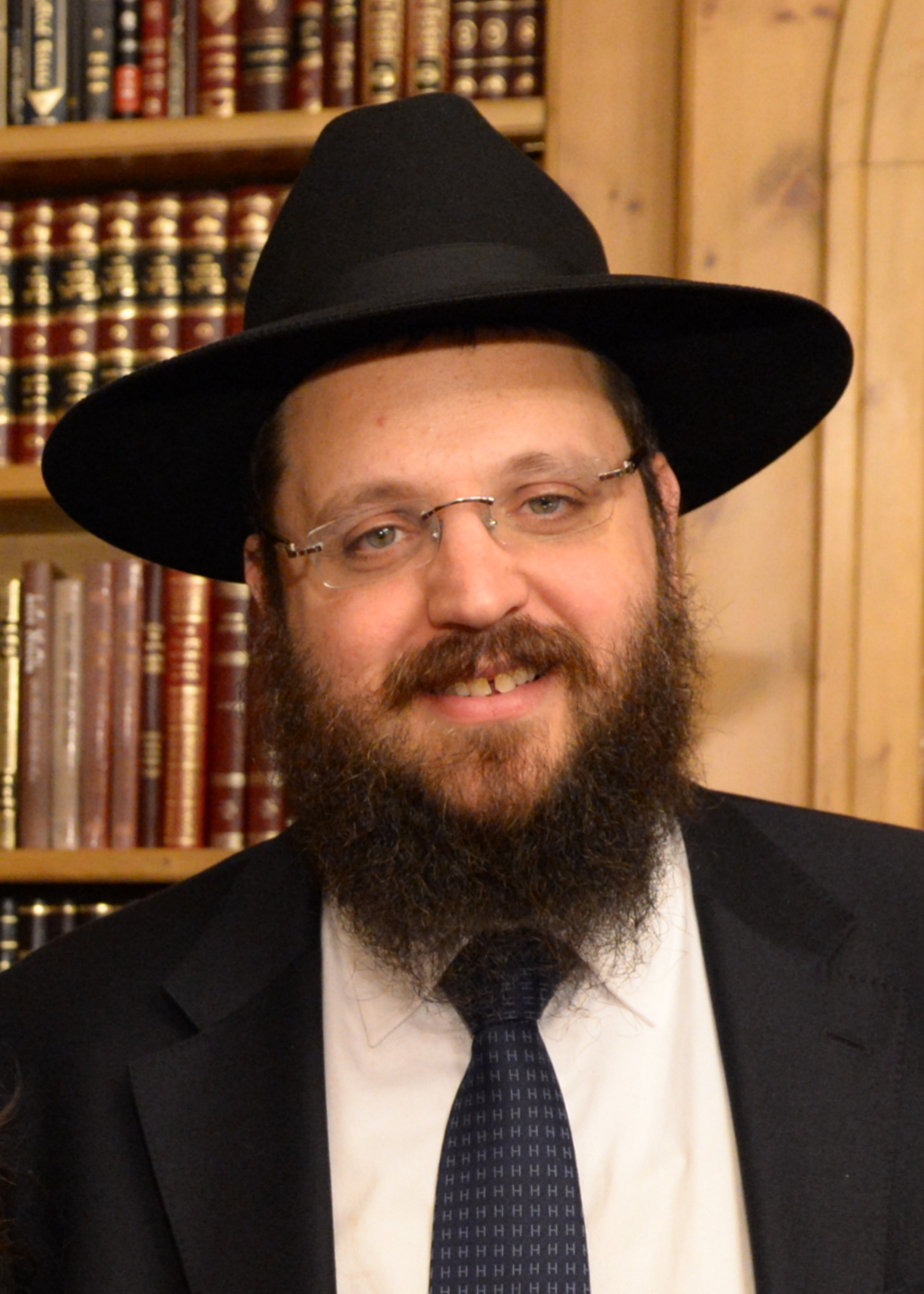

Rabbi Yehuda Teichtal (born 1972 in Brooklyn, New York, United States), is an Orthodox rabbi based in Berlin, Germany. He is a rabbi in the city of Berlin and president of the Chabad Jewish Education Centre in Berlin.

== Biography ==
Teichtal was born in New York and grew up in a Hasidic Jewish family. His great-grandfather Rabbi Yissachar Shlomo Teichtal was one of the few European rabbis to support an active effort to settle the land of Israel. After completing his studies in New York, Los Angeles, Morristown (USA), Melbourne (Australia), and Wellington (New Zealand), Teichtal was ordained as a rabbi. In 1996, Teichtal arrived in Berlin together with his wife, Leah. As part of the Jewish community in Berlin, he founded a local Chabad branch. The largest Jewish education center in Europe was opened in 2007 under his direction in the western part of Berlin. The building was financed through contributions from community members.

== Titles and recognition ==
Rabbi Teichtal graduated from high school in 1989 and then attended rabbinical college in Morristown, New Jersey. At age 23 he was ordained as a rabbi by Rabbi Zalman Goldberg - one of the senior judges in the High Court of the Israeli Chief Rabbinate. Later he was also ordained by Rabbi Avraham Yosef - the chief rabbi of Holon, the son of Rabbi Ovadia Yosef, Rabbi Yohanan Gurary and Rabbi Yehuda Jeruslavski - the secretary of the Chabad Rabbinical Court in Israel. In 2002 Rabbi Yehuda Teichtal was ordained by the chief rabbi of Israel Eliyahu Bakshi-Doron to be a community rabbi. Rabbi Yehuda Teichtal is also a member of the rabbinical court of Berlin Machzihei-Hadat, which is recognized by the chief rabbi of Israel as declared on 3 July 2014.

Yehuda Teichtal is the founder of the Pears Jüdischer Campus in Berlin, Germany.

== Achievements ==
- 2004 establishment of the Jewish Kindergarten Gan Israel in Berlin
- 2005 establishment of the Jewish Traditional School, a government recognized elementary school.

== Family ==
Rabbi Teichtal is married to Leah Teichtal and is the father of two sons and four daughters.
