= Joseph von Kudler =

Austrian economist (1786–1853)

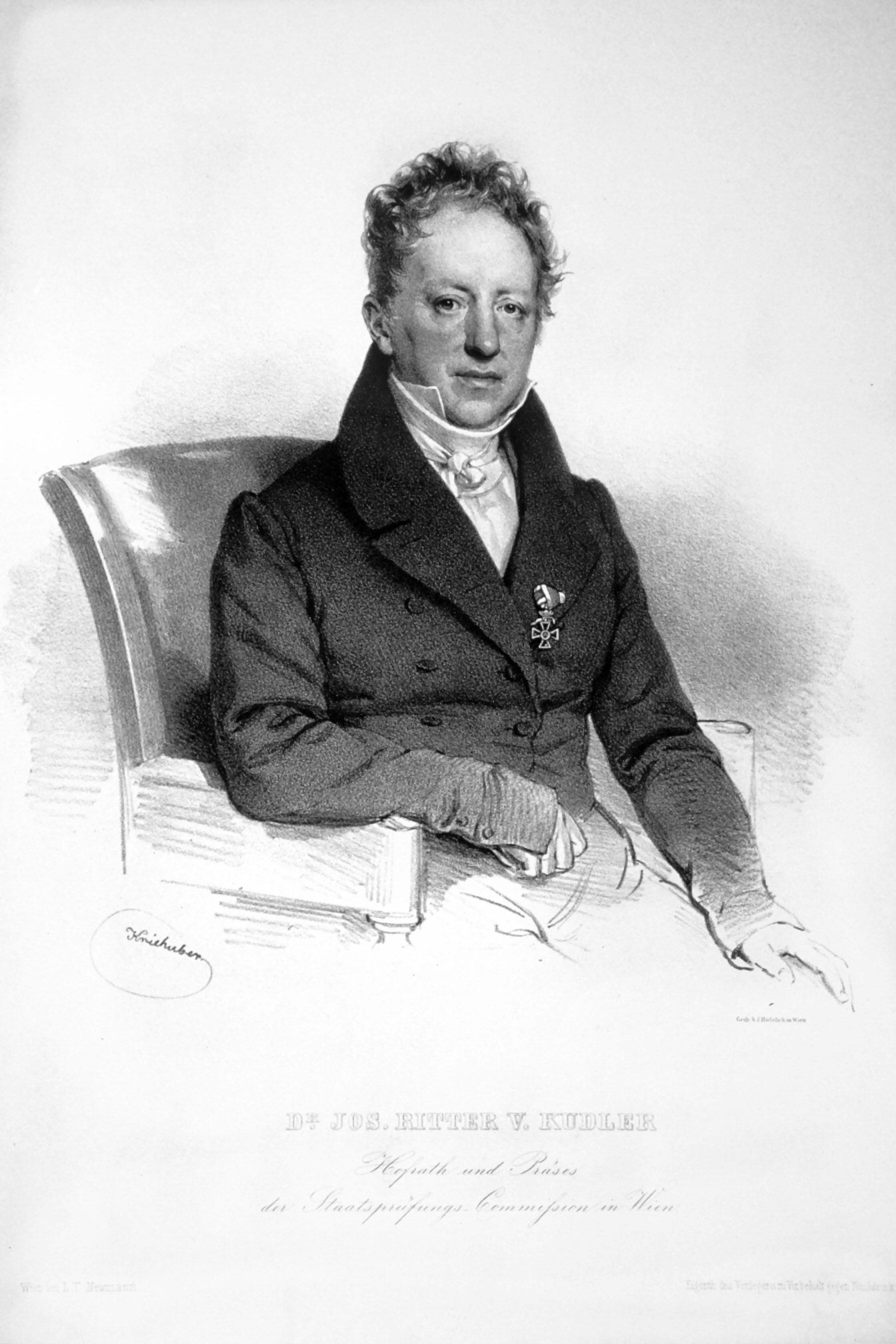
Josef Ritter von Kudler, lithography by Josef Kriehuber, 1838

Joseph von Kudler (10 October 1786 – 6 February 1853) was an Austrian economist, jurist and academic.

== Life ==
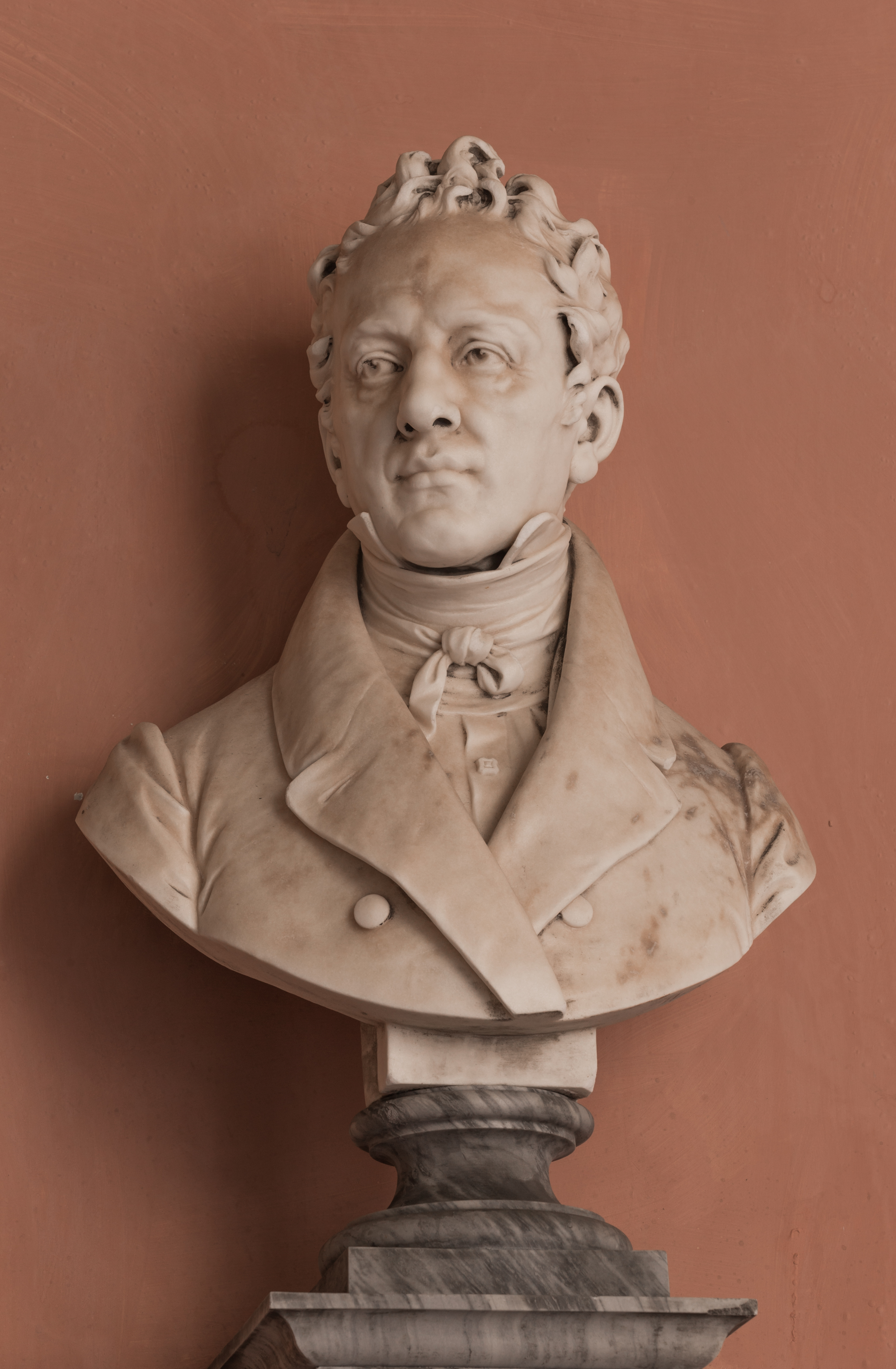
Bust in the courtyard of the University of Vienna, by Wilhelm Seib

Josef Kudler was born in Graz in 1786. He studied law and political sciences at the University of Vienna. Before obtaining his doctorate, he became a substitute teacher of statistics and political sciences. Between 1810 and 1821 he worked at the Graz Lyceum.

He was one of the founders of the Styrian agricultural society and the reading association of Graz Joanneum. He gave a big contribution to the creation and the growth of the insurance company against fire damages in Lower Austria and in Styria.

In 1821, he was assigned the chair of professor of political science and Austrian law in Vienna. In 1824, he published his Erklärung des Strafgesetzes über schwere Polizeiübertretungen ("Explanation of penal law regarding serious police crimes") in the magazine Zeitschrift für österr. Rechtsgelehrsamkeit und politische Gesetzkunde, of which he became editor-in-chief in 1834. There, he published numerous essays, among others, on tax issues. He thought that taxes should be levied only on income.

In 1845, he was called to participate in the committee for the reform of the system of jurisprudential studies and in 1848 he became vice-director of law and political sciences at the University of Vienna. In 1846 Die Grundlehren der Volkswirtschaft (Basic principles of the study of national economy) was published, written at the suggestion of young archduke Wilhelm, who was a political sciences' student of Kudler. In this work he defends freedom of acquisition, property and movement and the elimination of the tithe. Kudler, following Friedrich List thinking, advocated the application of moderate protectionistic taxes.

In 1849, he became head of the academic board of law and political sciences department at the University of Vienna.

In 1848, he became a member of the constituent Reichstag, of which he became the first president. Although he belonged to the conservative right-wing, he also supported the principles of freedom. He supported the abolition of corporal punishment. He requested a legislation to regulate the relations between Church and State, in order to preserve full freedom of conscience, but on the other hand to protect the power of the State over the Church.

Kudler took part in many charitable enterprises and business ventures, such as the Styrian Agricultural Society, various regional fire insurance companies, the Wolfsbach Iron Works Society, the Vienna Steam Mill Society, the Brunn Brewery, the Lower Austrian Merchants' Association and the Association for the Aid of Liberated Prisoners. In 1848, he became a member of the Austrian Academy of Sciences, in 1849 he was awarded the Knight's Cross of the Order of Leopold and in 1851 he was awarded the title of nobility, in 1852 he became a court councillor. He died in Vienna in 1853.

== Works ==
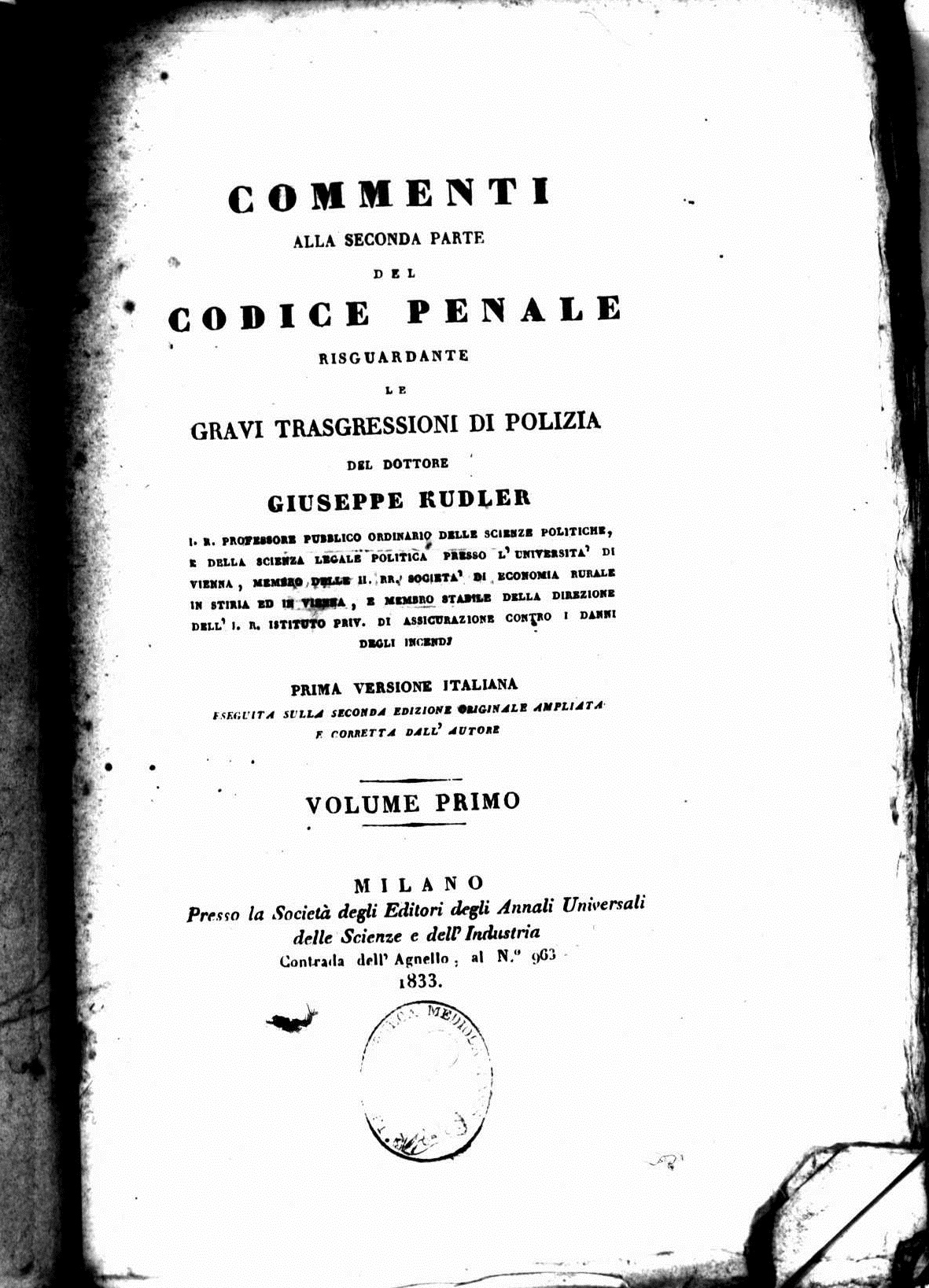
Commenti alla seconda parte del codice penale risguardante le gravi trasgressioni di polizia, 1833

- Die Grundlehren der Volkswirtschaft, Vienna 1846, 2 volumi.
- Steiermarks Volkszahl in den Jahren 1819 und 1820, in Steiermärkischen Zeitschrift, 1821.
- Steiermarks Viehstand in den Jahren 1819 u. 1820, ibid.
- Über d. Beziehung der Wissenschaften zum Staatsbürgerlichen Leben, ibid., 1824.
- Über d. Vorzüge d. Versicherungsanstalten mit wechselseitiger Gewährleistung vor jenen, welche als gewinnbringende Unternehmungen begründet werden, ibid.
- Erklärung des Strafgesetzes über schwere Polizeiübertretungen, 1824.
  - Commenti alla seconda parte del codice penale risguardante le gravi trasgressioni di polizia (in Italian). Vol. 1. Milano: Societa degli editori degli annali universali delle scienze e dell'industria. 1833.
