= Escape clause =

Contact term allowing non-performance

An escape clause is any clause, term, or condition in a contract that allows a party to that contract to avoid having to perform its obligations under the contract.

If an agreement was drawn up for the sale of a house, for example, the purchaser could include some kind of escape clause in the contract, which will allow him to "escape" from the contract without being liable for breach of contract.

International trade agreements tend to include escape clauses. Common escape clauses include countervailing duty penalties, antidumping statutes, national security exceptions, infant industry exceptions, balance of payment exceptions, and safeguard clauses.

== Real estate escape clauses ==
A "Subject to a builder's inspection to purchaser's full satisfaction" clause is one example of an escape clause. This clause effectively allows the purchaser to "escape" from the contract if an inspection reveals any irregularities or defects.

Another example is the "Subject to 30-day due diligence" clause, which effectively gives the purchaser a 30-day period to inspect any and all aspects of the property before having to commit to the purchase.

A 72-hour clause is an example of a seller's escape clause that may appear in real estate contracts.

The finance contingency clause makes the purchase offer contingent upon either the buyer or the property or both qualifying for the loan or mortgage the buyer will need.

== Escape clause abuse ==
Escape clauses, although fulfilling a real and sincere purpose in contracts of all kinds, have the potential of being abused.

For example, the "Subject to a surveyor's inspection to purchaser's full satisfaction" clause mentioned above can be abused if the buyer contracts a surveyor and instructs then to find some kind of fault in the property. The buyer, in other words, takes advantage of the escape clause to cancel the agreement to buy because he has buyer remorse, rather than because there is something wrong with the property.

== Escape clause validity ==
Escape clauses that require a purchaser or an expert representing the purchaser to be satisfied with the goods or services being purchased, have been challenged as being invalid due to lack of consideration. The argument is that a party can always escape such a contract by merely claiming to be dissatisfied. Therefore, there is no real requirement for that party to perform their obligations under the contract (to pay for the goods or services), and an agreement that only requires performance by one party is an illusory promise, void as a contract. Instead, such an agreement constitutes a gift from the performing party to the non-performing party.

Courts have generally held, however, that an escape clause containing a requirement of satisfaction nevertheless creates an enforceable contract, because a court could determine whether a claimed dissatisfaction was or was not reasonable, and therefore feigned to avoid the contract.

== International trade institutions ==
International trade agreements tend to include at least one form of escape clause. Common escape clauses include countervailing duty penalties, antidumping statutes, national security exceptions, infant industry exceptions, balance of payment exceptions, and safeguard clauses. Escape clauses tend to be attractive in the drafting of trade treaties because they give political leaders flexibility to implement trade protection if there is domestic pressure to do so.

== See also ==
- Break clause
- Force majeure
