= Why Russia Is Not America =

1999 book by Andrei Parshev

Why Russia is not America
- Book cover in Russian language Почему Россия не Америка, in English, "Why Russia is not America".
- Author: Andrei Parshev
- Original title: Почему Россия не Америка
- Language: Russian
- Genre: Opinion journalism
- Publisher: Крымский мост-9Д, Форум
- Publication date: 1999
- Publication place: Russia
- Pages: 416

Why Russia is not America (Russian: Почему Россия не Америка) is a book by Andrei Parshev, a Russian writer and former colonel of the Russian Federal Border Service. It was published in 1999.

The work is dedicated to proving that due to the peculiarities of Russia (harsh climate and long distances), the applied liberal model of market reforms is unsuitable for the country, and their continuation will lead to the extinction of a significant part of the population and the collapse of the country. According to Parshev, he wanted to name his work “The book for those who stay here”, but the publisher insisted on the current title.

The authors of the book The Siberian Curse Fiona Hill and Clifford G. Gaddy highly praised the book by Parshev and his description of the shortcomings of the cold climate. However, they think he is mistaken in this main conclusion that the Russian cold is a defining characteristic of the country’s economy.
