= Norman Naimark =

American historian (born 1944)

Norman M. Naimark
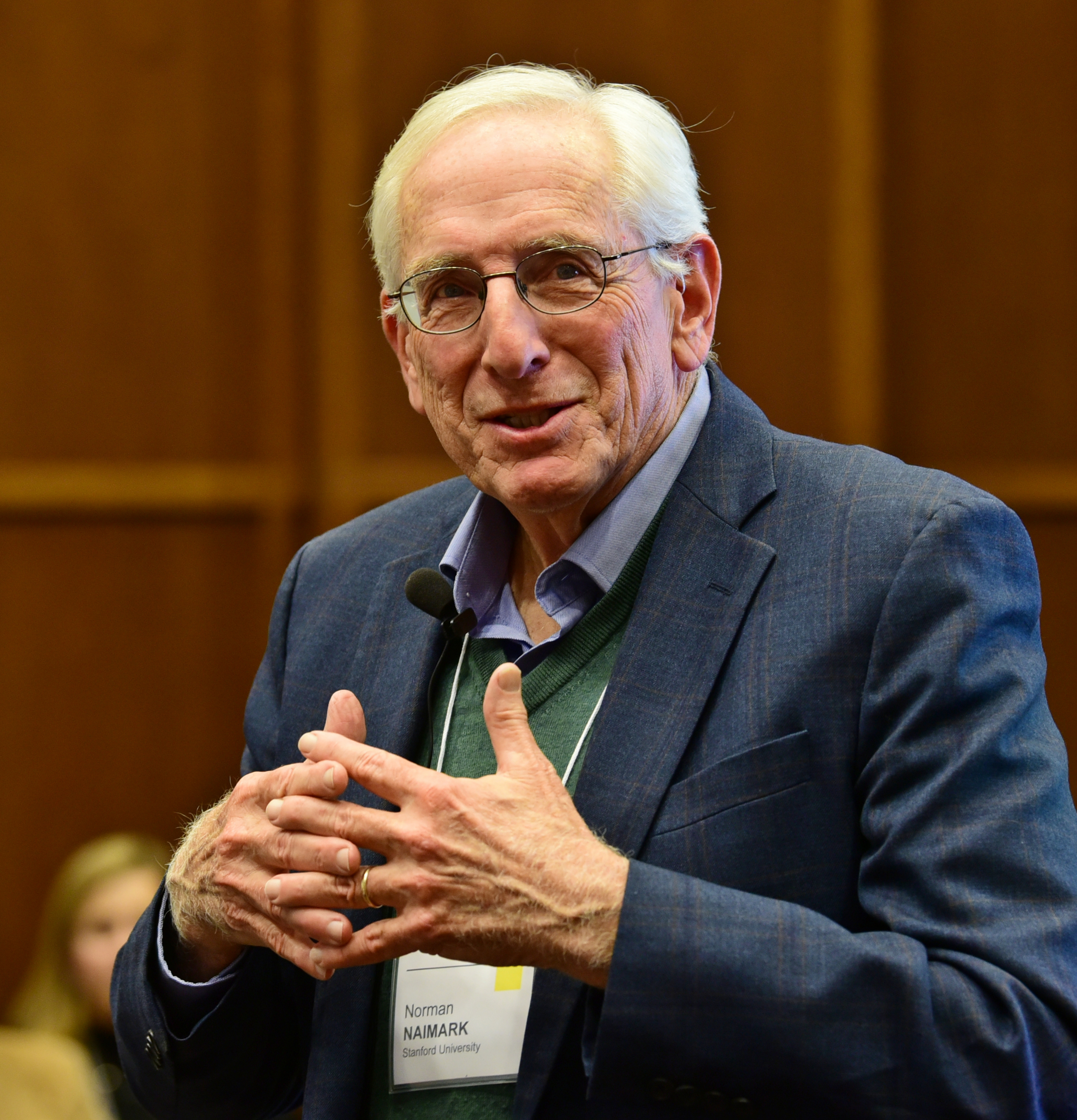
- Norman M. Naimark in 2018
- Born: 1944 (age 81–82); New York City, U.S.
- Occupation: Historian
- Spouse: Katherine Jolluck (m. 2000)

Academic background
- Education: Stanford University (BA, MA, PhD)
- Influences: Barrington Moore Jr.'s Social Origins of Dictatorship and Democracy

Academic work
- Main interests: Modern Eastern European history, genocide, and ethnic cleansing in the region
- Notable works: The Russians In Germany (1995)

Norman M. Naimark (/ˈneɪmɑːrk/; born 1944, New York City) is an American historian. He is the Robert and Florence McDonnell Professor of Eastern European Studies at Stanford University, and a senior fellow at the Hoover Institution. He writes on modern Eastern European history, genocide, and ethnic cleansing in the region.

== Career ==
Naimark received all of his degrees at Stanford. He taught at Boston University, and was a fellow at Harvard University's Russian Research Center before returning to Stanford as a member of the faculty in the 1980s. Naimark is of Jewish heritage; his parents were born in Galicia.

He is a member of the editorial boards of a number of professional journals, including The American Historical Review and The Journal of Contemporary History.

He was awarded the Officer's Cross of the Order of Merit by Germany.

He may be best-known for his acclaimed study, The Russians In Germany. He wrote in a 2017 essay that genocide is often tied to war, dehumanization, and/or economic resentment. He writes, "if there weren’t other very good reasons to prevent war, the correlation between war and genocide is a good one".

=== Views on the definition of genocide ===
Throughout his more recent works, Naimark argues that the "world needs a much broader definition of genocide" than set by the 1948 Genocide Convention to also include "nations killing social classes and political groups." In his 2010 work Stalin’s Genocides, Naimark makes a case that the government of the Soviet Union under Joseph Stalin "killed systematically rather than episodically" and that Dekulakization, Holodomor and Great Purge "shouldn’t be seen as discrete episodes, but seen together", calling it "a horrific case of genocide – the purposeful elimination of all or part of a social group, a political group."

Naimark argues that they constitute genocide due to, among other factors, the intent of extermination that underpinned them: the quotas that sometimes were set on the number of people that needed to be executed or arrested, the dehumanizing language directed at kulaks, slogans promoted by activists openly calling for their extermination, and a "great deal of evidence of government connivance" regarding Holodomor. Naimark writes that early drafts of the UN Genocide Convention had included the killing of social and political groups in the initial definitions of genocide, but were dropped after the Soviet delegation threatened to veto the convention.

==== Reception ====
The Journal of Cold War Studies asked several academic scholars of Soviet history, Joshua Rubenstein, Paul Hollander, Andrea Graziosi, Roman Szporluk, Jeffrey Hardy, Michael Ellman, and Jeffrey Rossman to write commentaries about Naimark's book about Stalin and genocide and the more expansive definition of genocide he supports. These were released as Perspectives on Norman Naimark’s Stalin’s Genocides (2012).

In his critique, Joshua Rubenstein agrees with Naimark's characterization that both Hitler and Stalin deserve to be known as "genocidaires" from a contemporary standpoint. However, he also disagrees with Naimark's apparent equating of Hitler and Stalin because the Soviet Union prevented Nazi Germany's attempt to conquer and subjugate all of Europe, suggesting the Soviet system was therefore a lesser evil when seen in a historical context.

Hollander also agrees with Naimark's use of a definition of genocide to include social and political groups.

Andrea Graziosi's analysis was more critical than Naimark's, writing he "could have presented an even stronger case" because his analysis of the Great Terror is outdated and overemphasizes the nature of that purge (which primarily targeted elites), failing to reflect recent research that highlights the mass operations and targeted minority groups. Graziosi stated that his approach thus aligns more with older interpretations and neglects the true scope and systematic nature of the terror that victimized primarily ordinary people and specific ethnic groups.

Jeffrey Hardy's review raises a critical question within the broader argument of Naimark's book. Hardy highlights the complexities of categorizing Stalin's victims, particularly the kulaks, who he believes were defined more by their perceived opposition to the regime than any inherent shared identity. Despite this, Naimark insists that the kulaks constitute a social 'group' targeted for genocide, a stance Hardy finds questionable. Furthermore, Hardy questions Naimark's decision to limit the designation of genocide to specific subgroups within the Soviet peasantry, rather than recognizing the widespread suffering as a whole.

Michael Ellman takes the most critical view of the book: "The liberal interpretation of genocide that Naimark favors is... in line with recent jurisprudence. However, he fails to point out the boomerang effect of such an interpretation. According to a recent book by a U.S. specialist on genocide... the massacres of some of the native Americans by European settlers, the Atlantic Slave Trade, the use of a nuclear bomb against Nagasaki...should all be considered genocides. This would make the United States founded on two genocides and guilty... of more... In view of this boomerang effect, my advice to Western governments is to stick to a strict constructionist interpretation of genocide. Hence, I disagree with Naimark’s wish to classify Stalin’s mass murders as genocide."

Roman Szporluk agreed with Naimark about deeming Stalin's actions as genocidal. He also suggests that Naimark's book aligns with a lesser-known aspect of Marx's theory of class struggle. While Marx is often associated with revolutionary reconstitution of society, he also acknowledges the possibility of "common ruin" for the contending classes. Szporluk argues that Stalin's regime, with its widespread violence and purges, exemplifies this alternative outcome of class conflict, highlighting the destructive potential inherent in Marxist theory.

=== Stalin and post-War Europe ===
Though primarily focused on the history of genocide, Naimark has also written books dealing with geopolitical history. He authored Stalin and the Fate of Europe: The Postwar Struggle for Sovereignty in 2019. In this work, he criticizes the notion that the outbreak of the Cold War in Europe after World War II was "inevitable". Throughout, Naimark argues that Stalin was far more amenable to a settlement with the Western Allies than previously thought and did not initially have a plan to build the cohesive Eastern Bloc of Soviet satellite states within Europe. He also states that, while Stalin imposed his will in some countries like Poland and East Germany, he surprisingly favored restraint and accommodation in others like Denmark, Finland, and Austria. Stalin's ultimate goal remained a Europe susceptible to Soviet influence, showcasing a leader navigating a delicate balance between dominance and diplomacy.

== Published works ==
Books

- —— (2019). Stalin and the Fate of Europe: The Postwar Struggle for Sovereignty. Harvard University Press. ISBN 978-0-674-23877-0. OCLC 1089965391.
- —— (2017). Genocide: A World History. Oxford University Press. ISBN 978-0-19-976527-0. OCLC 953175336.
- Suny, Ronald Grigor; Göçek, Fatma Müge; ——, eds. (2011). A Question of Genocide: Armenians and Turks at the End of the Ottoman Empire. Oxford University Press. ISBN 978-0-19-539374-3. OCLC 645707923.
- —— (2010). Stalin's Genocides. Princeton University Press. ISBN 978-0-691-14784-0.
- —— (2001). Fires Of Hatred: Ethnic Cleansing In 20th Century Europe. Harvard University Press. ISBN 978-0-674-00313-2. OCLC 1245237010.
- —— (1995). The Russians In Germany: The History Of The Soviet Zone Of Occupation, 1945–1949. Harvard University Press. ISBN 978-0-674-78405-5. OCLC 32276211.
- —— (1983). Terrorists And Social Democrats: The Russian Revolutionary Movement Under Alexander III. Harvard University Press. ISBN 978-0-674-87464-0. OCLC 9080916.
- —— (1979). The History of the "Proletariat": The Emergence of Marxism in the Kingdom of Poland, 1870–1887. East European monographs. Vol. 54. East European Quarterly; distributed by Columbia University Press. ISBN 978-0-914710-50-9. OCLC 5722861.
