= Trust International Paper Corporation =

Pulp and paper company in the Philippines

- Industry: Pulp and paper
- Founded: 1987; 39 years ago in Mabalacat, Philippines
- Founders: Elon Ting; Sylvia S. Y. Chen
- Headquarters: Mabalacat, Pampanga, Philippines
- Area served: Worldwide
- Products: Newsprint, recycled paper
- Website: www.tipco.com.ph

Trust International Paper Corporation (TIPCO) is a Philippine pulp and paper company which is known for manufacturing newsprint, newsprint, printing and writing-grade paper from recycled materials.

== History ==
Trust International Paper Corporation was established in 1987 in Mabalacat, Pampanga by Elon Ting and Sylvia S. Y. Chen.

In the early 2000s, its overseas markets included Singapore, Taiwan, Hong Kong, mainland China, Thailand, Malaysia, India and Hawaii in the United States.

American-born Filipino Mayleen Ting, the daughter of the founders, took over TIPCO's management in 2008.

TIPCO in 2014 sought government intervention in newsprint imports through safeguard measures that would impose higher duties on imported newsprint arguing the level of importation and price dumping is hurting the domestic industry. The national government granted the safeguard measure but to a lesser extent than TIPCO proposed which led to the company deferring its investment plans.

In 2014, TIPCO reportedly was the largest paper company in the Philippines, having an annual production capacity of 230,000 MT for paper-based products including newsprint and writing paper.

In 2020, due to the government mandated temporary shutdown of all business, including manufacturing operations, during COVID-19 pandemic, TIPCO temporarily suspended its production. However, in 2020, the Group restructured and rebranded under TIPCO Group, Inc. to accommodate for its various operations and businesses.
