= Andrei Parshev =

Russian political writer (born 1955)

Andrei Petrovich Parshev (Russian: Андре́й Петро́вич Па́ршев; born 16 February 1955 in Moscow) is a Russian political writer. His best known book, Why Russia is not America, sets forth his climate-based theory of Russian economic problems. He also wrote Why America is Attacking, arguing that military control over oil-producing countries is essential for the survival of the American economy.

Parshev graduated from the Bauman Moscow State Technical University in electrical engineering in 1978. He subsequently worked as engineer and lecturer in the border guards detachment of the KGB, now known as Border Guard Service of Russia and rose to the rank of colonel.

== Political and economic views ==
Parshev is known for arguing that an economic system based on liberal capitalism is unsuited for Russia because, as he claims, the harsh Russian climate makes the Russian economy inherently uncompetitive with other nations (e.g. with low temperatures high heating costs requiring higher salaries for workers and more expensive construction methods).

Parshev argues for the scaling down of Russian foreign trade, greater self-sufficiency and autarky, and for a return to more Soviet-style forms of management in economy and politics. His writings are influential among Russian nationalist and ultranationalist circles.

== See also ==
- The Siberian Curse: How Communist Planners Left Russia Out in the Cold
- The Ultimate Resource
