= Ulrich Menzel =

German political scientist

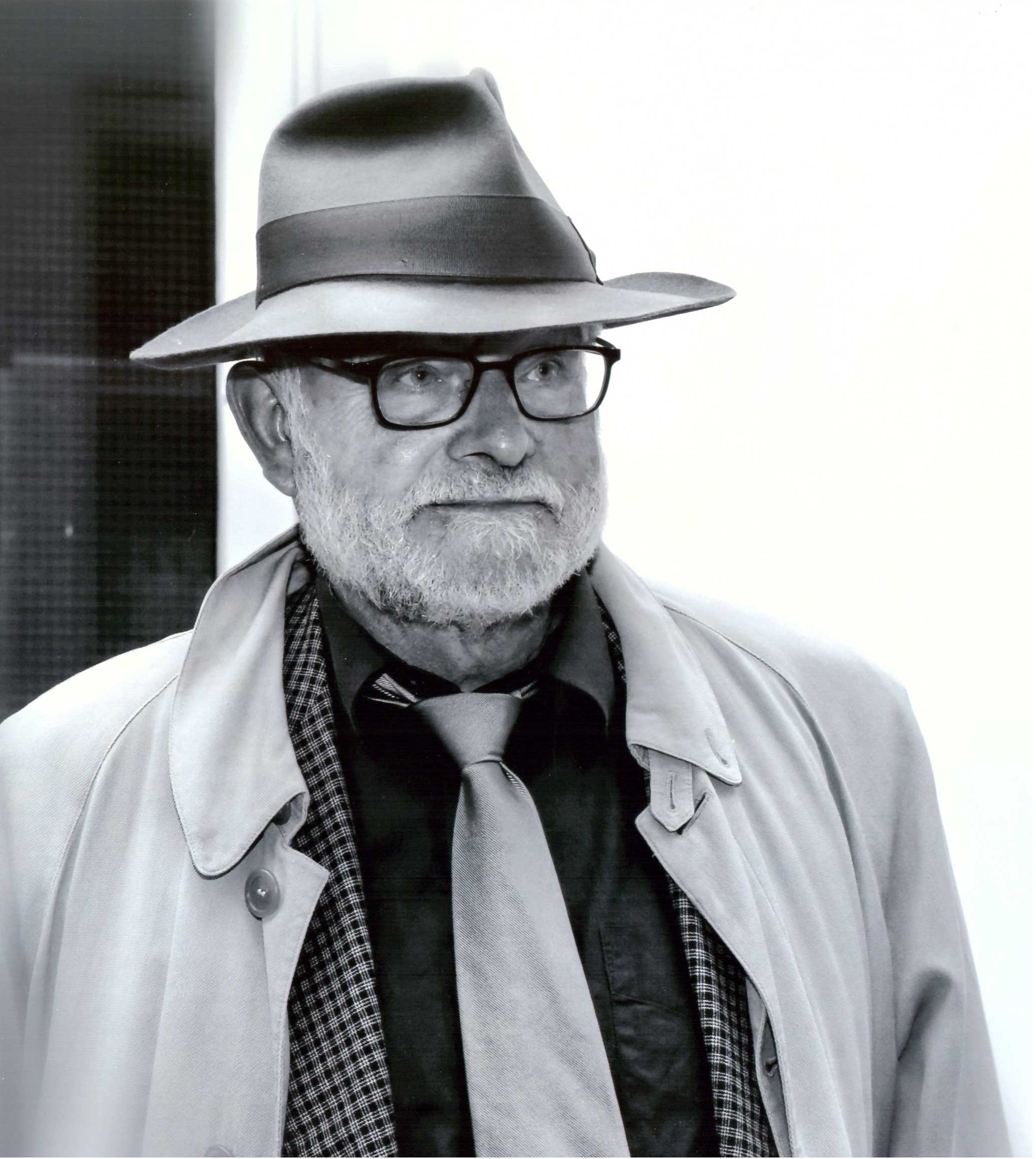
Ulrich Menzel

Ulrich Menzel (born 21 July 1947 in Düsseldorf) is a German political scientist.

== Biography ==
Menzel attended the Humboldt-Gymnasium Düsseldorf until his Abitur in 1967. He studied political science, history, philosophy, sociology and German studies in Düsseldorf, Cologne and Frankfurt am Main from 1969 to 1974. In 1978 he received his doctorate in Frankfurt with a dissertation on The Chinese Development Model in Theory and Practice under Dieter Senghaas. In 1982 he habilitated in political science, also in Frankfurt, with a thesis on Autocentric Development despite World Market Integration.

After completing his doctorate, he taught and researched in the University of Bremen, University of Tokyo, Frankfurt, University of Duisburg and Braunschweig before being appointed to the Chair of International Relations and Comparative Government at the Institute of Social Sciences at the Technical University of Braunschweig in 1993. He served as Dean (1995-1997) and Vice President (2001-2003). From 2004 until his retirement in 2015, he was managing director of the Institute of Social Sciences. In 2009, a festschrift was published in his honor, and his overall work has been discussed by several authors:

Menzel's teaching and research fields are the theory and history of the international system, hegemony in world history, development theory, development politics and North–South relations, international political economy and peace and conflict studies.

His regional interests lie mainly in East and Southeast Asia (especially China and Japan) and Europe.

His major work, Die Ordnung der Welt. Imperium oder Hegemonie in der Hierarchie der Staatenwelt. (The Order of the World) was published in 2015.

In the course of his research on globalisation, he provided a definition: globalisation is the intensification and acceleration of cross-border transactions with their simultaneous spatial expansion, or shorter is the compression of space and time. On the occasion of the COVID-19 pandemic, he predicted the possible end of globalisation because the discourse of globalisation has become defensive.

== Publications ==
- with Dieter Senghaas (ed.): Multinationale Konzerne und Dritte Welt. Westdeutscher Verlag, Opladen 1976, ISBN 3-531-11361-5.
- Theorie und Praxis des chinesischen Entwicklungsmodells. Ein Beitrag zum Konzept autozentrierter Entwicklung. Westdeutscher Verlag, Opladen 1978, ISBN 3-531-11451-4.
- Wirtschaft und Politik im modernen China. Eine Sozial- und Wirtschaftsgeschichte von 1842 bis nach Maos Tod. Westdeutscher Verlag, Opladen 1978, ISBN 3-531-11460-3.
- with Gerd Wontroba: Stagnation und Unterentwicklung in Korea. Von der Yi-Dynastie zur Peripherisierung unter japanischer Kolonialherrschaft. Anton Hain, Meisenheim am Glan 1978, ISBN 3-445-01822-7.
- In der Nachfolge Europas. Autozentrierte Entwicklung in den ostasiatischen Schwellenländern Südkorea und Taiwan. Simon & Magiera, München 1985, ISBN 3-88676-101-0.
- with Dieter Senghaas: Europas Entwicklung und die Dritte Welt. Eine Bestandsaufnahme. Suhrkamp, Frankfurt am Main 1986, ISBN 3-518-11393-3.
- Auswege aus der Abhängigkeit. Die entwicklungspolitische Aktualität Europas. Suhrkamp, Frankfurt am Main 1988, ISBN 3-518-11312-7.
- (ed.): Im Schatten des Siegers: Japan. 4 volumes, Frankfurt am Main: Suhrkamp 1989, ISBN 3-518-11495-6, ISBN 3-518-11496-4, ISBN 3-518-11497-2 and ISBN 3-518-11498-0.
- (ed.): Nachdenken über China. Suhrkamp, Frankfurt am Main 1990, ISBN 3-518-11602-9.
- Das Ende der Dritten Welt und das Scheitern der großen Theorie. Suhrkamp, Frankfurt am Main 1992, ISBN 3-518-11718-1.
- Geschichte der Entwicklungstheorie. Einführung und systematische Bibliographie. (3rd, revised edition) Deutsches Übersee-Institut, Hamburg 1995, ISBN 3-926953-30-6.
- Shanghai. Systematische Bibliographie. Mit einer Einführung und einem Anhang zu Yokohama. Deutsches Übersee-Institut, Hamburg 1995, ISBN 3-922852-61-0.
- Globalisierung versus Fragmentierung. Suhrkamp, Frankfurt am Main 1998, ISBN 3-518-12022-0.
- with Katharina Varga: Theorie und Geschichte der Lehre von den Internationalen Beziehungen. Deutsches Übersee-Institut, Hamburg 1999, ISBN 3-926953-44-6 (online, pdf).
- with Mathias Albert u. a.: Die Neue Weltwirtschaft. Entstofflichung und Entgrenzung der Ökonomie. Suhrkamp, Frankfurt am Main 1999, ISBN 3-518-11983-4.
- (ed.): Vom ewigen Frieden und vom Wohlstand der Nationen. Dieter Senghaas zum 60. Geburtstag. Suhrkamp, Frankfurt am Main 2000, ISBN 3-518-12173-1.
- Zwischen Idealismus und Realismus. Die Lehre von den internationalen Beziehungen. Suhrkamp, Frankfurt am Main 2001, ISBN 3-518-12224-X.
- mit Hartwig Hummel (ed.): Die Ethnisierung internationaler Wirtschaftsbeziehungen und daraus resultierende Konflikte. Lit, Münster 2001, ISBN 3-8258-4836-1.
- Paradoxien der neuen Weltordnung. Politische Essays. Suhrkamp, Frankfurt am Main 2004, ISBN 3-518-12365-3.
- with Reinhard Stockmann and Franz Nuscheler: Entwicklungspolitik. Theorien-Probleme-Strategien. Oldenbourg, München 2010. (2nd, revised edition) 2016, ISBN 978-3-486-71874-4)
- Die Ordnung der Welt. Imperium oder Hegemonie in der Hierarchie der Staatenwelt. Suhrkamp Verlag, Berlin 2015, ISBN 978-3-518-42372-1.
- Die Steigbügelhalter und ihr Lohn. Hitlers Einbürgerung in Braunschweig als Weichenstellung auf dem Weg zur Macht und die Modernisierung des Braunschweiger Landes. Appelhans Verlag, Braunschweig 2020; ISBN 978-3-944939-84-1.

=== Essays ===
- Der Differenzierungsprozeß in der Dritten Welt und seine Konsequenzen für den Nord-Süd-Konflikt. In: Politische Vierteljahresschrift 24. 1983, 1. S. 31–59.
- Das Ende der "Dritten Welt" und das Scheitern der großen Theorie. Zur Soziologie in auch selbstkritischer Absicht. In: Politische Vierteljahresschrift 32.1991, 1. S. 4–33.
- New Images of the Enemy: The Renaissance of Geopolitics and Geoculture in International Relations. In: International Journal of Political Economy 26. 1996, 3. S. 69-80
- Wohin treibt die Welt? In: Aus Politik und Zeitgeschichte. Supplement to the weekly newspaper Das Parlament 66.2016, 43–45. S. 4–8.
- Der Niedergang der Volksparteien und der Umbruch des Parteiensystems. In: Braunschweigische Wissenschaftliche Gesellschaft Jahrbuch 2018, Braunschweig 2019. S. 281–320
- Der Niedergang der Volksparteien und der Strukturwandel des Parteiensystems, Teil II. In: Braunschweigische Wissenschaftliche Gesellschaft Jahrbuch 2019, Braunschweig 2020. S. 80–98
- Globalization demystified? Neoliberalism´s corona shock In: Eurozine 4 May 2020
