= Infant industry =

Undeveloped branch of national economy

In economics, an infant industry is a new industry, which in its early stages experiences relative difficulty or is absolutely incapable in competing with established competitors abroad.

== History ==
Britain was one of the first nations to protect industries in their early development with regard to their raw wool industry. Among other measures, the nation ensured that competition was not allowed to import into their market especially when the destined goods were of superior quality. After about 100 years of protectionism of this wool industry, the country finally decided that duties on exports would be lifted.

The idea of supporting infant industries was first articulated by Alexander Hamilton in his 1791 Report on Manufactures and later developed further by Friedrich List. As for the US, in 1789 one of the first acts of the US Congress was to impose tariffs on a variety of imports including cotton, leather, and various forms of clothing, in an effort to protect the American textile industry.

== Infant industry argument ==
Governments are sometimes urged to support the development of infant industries, protecting home industries in their early stages, usually through subsidies or tariffs. Subsidies may be indirect, as in when import duties are imposed or some prohibition against the import of a raw or finished material is imposed. Economists argue that state support for infant industries is justified only if there are external benefits.

Infant industry protection is controversial as a policy recommendation. As with the other economic rationales for protectionism, it is often abused by rent seeking interests. In addition, countries that put up trade barriers to imports often face retaliatory barriers to their exports, potentially hurting the same industries that infant industry protection is intended to help. Even when infant industry protection is well-intentioned, it is difficult for governments to know which industries they should protect; infant industries may never grow up relative to adult foreign competitors.

== See also ==
- Import substitution industrialization
- Protectionism
