= Infant industry argument =

Rationale for protectionism

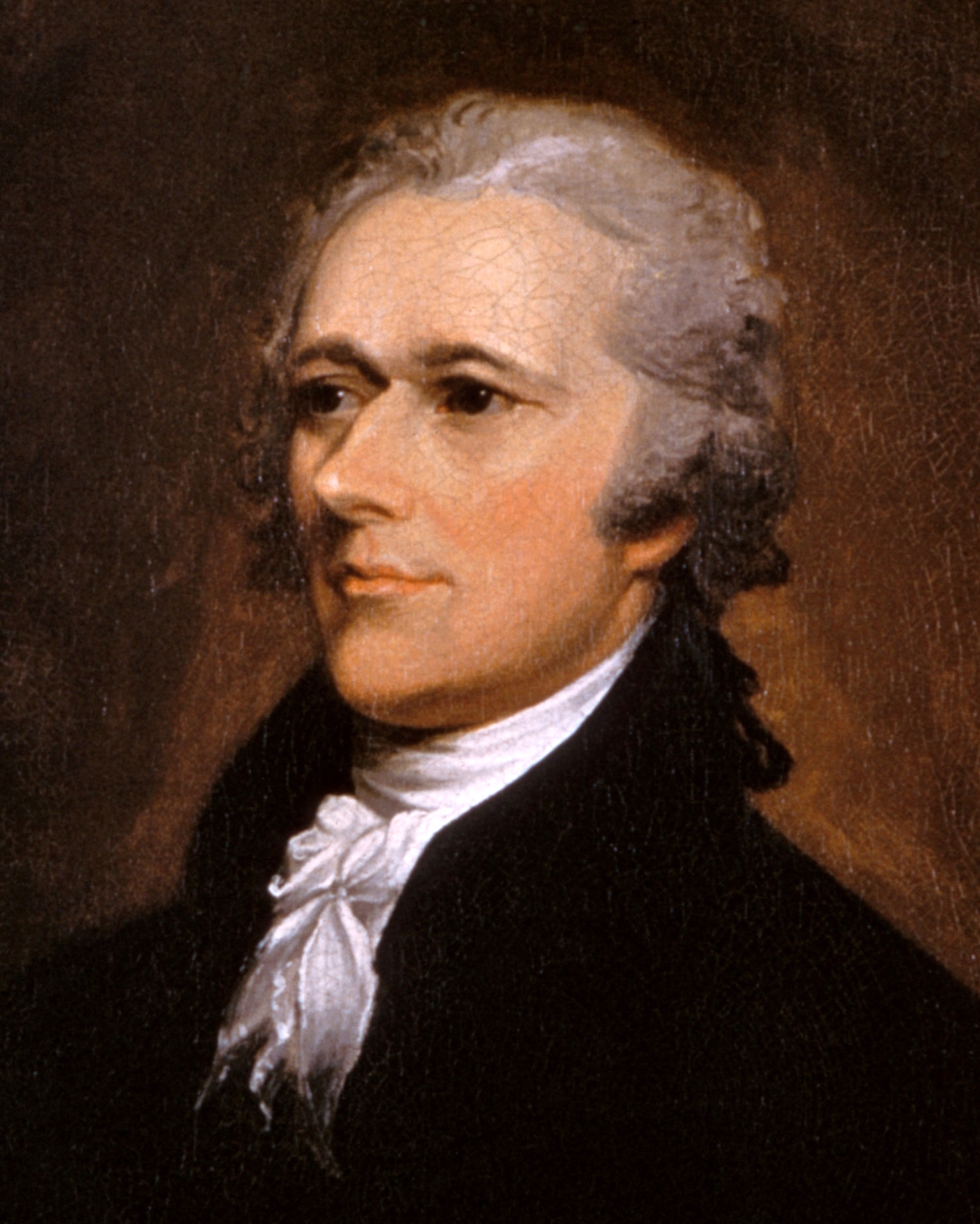
Alexander Hamilton first codified the infant industry argument.

The infant industry argument is an economic rationale for trade protectionism. The core of the argument is that nascent industries often do not have the economies of scale that their older competitors from other countries may have, and thus need to be protected until they can attain similar economies of scale. The logic underpinning the argument is that trade protectionism is costly in the short run but leads to long-term benefits.

Infant industry protection is controversial as a policy recommendation. As with the other economic rationales for protectionism, it is often abused by rent seeking interests. In addition, countries that put up trade barriers to imports often face retaliatory barriers to their exports, potentially hurting the same industries that infant industry protection is intended to help. Even when infant industry protection is well-intentioned, it is difficult for governments to know which industries they should protect; infant industries may never grow up relative to adult foreign competitors.

== Early articulations ==
The argument was first fully articulated by the first United States Secretary of the Treasury Alexander Hamilton in his 1790 Report on Manufactures. Hamilton professed that developing an industrial base in a country was impossible without protectionism because import duties are necessary to shelter domestic "infant industries" until they could achieve economies of scale. The argument was systematically developed by American political economist Daniel Raymond, and was later picked up by economist Friedrich List in his 1841 work The National System of Political Economy, following his exposure to the idea during his residence in the United States in the 1820s. List criticized Britain for advocating free trade to other countries given that Britain had obtained its economic supremacy through high tariffs and government subsidies. List stated that "it is a very common clever device that when anyone has attained the summit of greatness, he kicks away the ladder by which he climbed up, in order to deprive others of the means of climbing up after him."

== Views by heterodox economists ==
A minority of economists, for example heterodox economists like Ha-Joon Chang, claim that many countries have successfully industrialized behind tariff barriers, such as the United States and Britain. From 1816 through 1945, tariffs in the United States were among the highest in the world. Chang claimed that, "almost all of today's rich countries used tariff protection and subsidies to develop their industries". A study of French cotton producers during the Napoleonic Wars found that regions which were protected from international trade with Britain due to blockades of British shipping, experienced greater growth in mechanized cotton output than regions which continued to have close trade with Britain. Canada developed its infant industries, while facilitating the settlement of the Canadian West through immigration and railway construction under the National Policy (1879–1950s) following an earlier experiment in free trade with the United States. South Korea and Taiwan are more recent examples of rapid industrialization and economic development with major government subsidies, foreign exchange controls, and high tariffs to protect selected industries. In Latin America, many countries have implemented economic policies which establish high tariffs and other barriers to international trade, such as Brazil. Many Latin American economists have contributed to the development of theories related to economic nationalism, which in turn promotes the protection of infant industries.

== Failed implementations ==
During the 1980s Brazil enforced strict controls on the import of foreign computers in an effort to nurture its own infant computer industry. This industry never matured; the technological gap between Brazil and the rest of the world actually widened, while the protected industries merely copied low-end foreign computers and sold them at inflated prices.

According to Delphine Pouchain, Jérôme Ballet, Julien Devisme, and Catherine Duchêne in their book Économie des inégalités (2020), the protectionist measures adopted by many Latin American countries during the Great Depression led to inefficient domestic industries, limited competition, low productivity, and increased inequality. While the aim was to promote economic independence and support local industries, the actual outcome was often economic stagnation and structural weakness.

The case of Turkey in the 1960s is particularly noteworthy: the Turkish government implemented an import-substitution industrialization policy for many sectors (such as non-electrical tools and paper) and imposed high tariffs in certain branches. According to the logic of the infant industry argument, one would expect these protected industries to exhibit rapid growth in relative productivity shielded from international competition — yet this did not occur. Economists Anne Krueger and Tuncer Baran concluded that protected sectors did not become more efficient or competitive, indicating a failure of the infant industry policy.

== Recommendation to the United Nations ==
In his 2000 report to the UN Secretary-General, Ernesto Zedillo recommended "legitimising limited, time-bound protection for certain industries by countries in the early stages of industrialisation", arguing that "however misguided the old model of blanket protection intended to nurture import substitute industries, it would be a mistake to go to the other extreme and deny developing countries the opportunity of actively nurturing the development of an industrial sector".

== Criticism ==
The theory of infant industry protectionism assumes that emerging industries can catch up with more advanced competitors through temporary shielding from international competition. However, such catch-up is not guaranteed. Moreover, goods shielded from competition tend to be more expensive, making them less attractive to consumers.

Economists Krueger and Tuncer found no consistent empirical evidence that protected industries experienced faster productivity growth than unprotected ones.

Mainstream economists acknowledge that tariffs can sometimes support domestic industry development, but only if the protection is truly temporary and governments are able to identify industries with real long-term potential. In practice, tariffs often remain in place after the industry matures, and governments frequently fail to pick winners. Multiple empirical studies across different countries—such as Turkey in the 1960s and several Latin American nations—document failed attempts at infant industry protection. In many developing countries, industries have failed to attain international competitiveness even after 15 or 20 years of operation and might not survive if protective tariffs were removed.

Moreover, economists argue that infant-industry protection can be harmful not only at the national level but also internationally. If multiple countries pursue such protection simultaneously, it can fragment global markets, preventing firms from achieving economies of scale through exports, and leading to inefficient, small-scale production across countries.

== See also ==
- Industrial policy
- New trade theory
- Royal manufactories in France
