= Raimund Hermann Siegfried Moltke =

German writer and economist

Raimund Hermann Siegfried Moltke (usually known as Siegfried Moltke) (9 July 1869 in Leipzig – c. 1958) was a German writer and economist. He studied at Leipzig and at the Art Academy in Berlin and later became librarian of the Chamber of Commerce of Leipzig.

== Selected works ==
- Verse (1895)
- Aus Meiner Skizzenmappe (1897)
- Der Heilige Karl, a play (1903)
- Die Feder Geschärft (1914)
- Gott im Leide (1915)
- Kreuzwege des Lebens (1916)
- Um die Mark Main (1919)
- Leipzigs Handelskorporationem (1907)
- Zwei Kapitel aus Leipzigs Handelsund Verkehrsgeschichte (1912)
- Friedrich List (1913)
- Katalog Altkaufmännischer Archive in Leipzig (1913)
- Die Deutsche Eisenbahn im Kriege (1916)
- Die Leipziger Messe im Kriege (1917)

He wrote the biography Bernhard von Tauchnitz (1916).
