= Stalin and the Fate of Europe =

2019 book by Norman Naimark

- Author: Norman Naimark
- Genre: Cold War history
- Publisher: Belknap Press (Owned by Harvard University Press
- Publication date: October 8, 2019
- ISBN: 9780674238770

Stalin and the Fate of Europe: The Postwar Struggle for Sovereignty is a historical book written by Stanford University historian Norman Naimark.

Published in 2019 by Harvard University Press, the book discusses Soviet leader Joseph Stalin's post-World War II strategies and interactions with Eastern European countries as they sought to assert their sovereignty amidst growing Cold War tensions. Naimark provides an examination of Stalin's influence in shaping post-war Europe, contesting simplistic narratives of Soviet domination and highlighting the complexities of power dynamics during this period.

The book was listed as one of the best history books of 2019 by the Financial Times. It also won the 2020 Norris and Carol Hundley Award and the 2020, US-Russia Relations Book Prize.

== Reviews ==
Writing in The Guardian, historian Daniel Beer praised the findings of the book but also criticized its selective use of examples. Beer agrees with much of Naimark’s claim that Stalin improvised to protect Soviet interests, largely on the basis that the book's case studies are sharp and reveal how local European leaders carved out room to manoeuvre. Beer singles out Finland, Italy, Austria, and the divided Berlin as convincing examples. However, Beer also believes the various Soviet interventions in Hungary, Czechoslovakia, Bulgaria, eastern Germany, and Romania were not sufficiently covered by Naimark. Overall, Beer states that Naimark reveals, in a well-supported manner how the policy of the Soviets was mostly improvised and reactive to "atomic-powered US military superiority" and "shrewd machinations" of European leaders.

Another favorable review came from Paul Hanebrink, writing in The American Historical Review. He states that Naimark takes a "traditional approach to politics", focusing on the political decision-making of Europe's leading statesmen. His main criticism of the book is twofold: first, that Naimark seldom looks at "the everyday politics of ordinary people" in Europe and second, that the book treats the development of anti-communism as a "...static force rather than a dynamic and malleable ideology" that could ignite different political initiatives across the continent.

In a positive review, Austrian-American historian Günter Bischof praises Naimark as a “master historian”. He states the book’s value lies in its vast, multilingual archival base and the surprising reframing it yields: Stalin lacked a pre-set blueprint to 'sovietize' Europe and acted primarily from security concerns. What Bischof most appreciates in the case studies is how they foreground European agency across the continent's leaders, namely Reuter, Paasikivi, Renner, Figl, De Gasperi, over determinist Cold War narratives. Bischof praises the existence of a chapter on Austria separate from that of Germany, which he states "is normally subsumed under Germany" in most "Anglo-American literature". He further singles out the chapter on Austria for deft sourcing and even‑handed criticism of Austrian communists and asks whether Soviet leaders sounded “more Austrian” than Austria’s communists because unlike the latter, they wanted the Soviet occupation of the country to end. Austria's communists had opposed the Soviet withdrawal from Austria. The Kremlin (as stated by Zhdanov) thought the Austrian communists were strong enough to succeed without a Soviet presence.

Czech historian Jan Koura praises the book. By “taking off the Cold War lenses,” Koura states that Naimark shows that the rivalry between superpowers wasn’t the only driver. Local elites’ identities, national traditions, and domestic political calculations also shaped outcomes. Koura highlights this as a key strength of the book. However, Koura finds the Poland and Italy chapters the least convincing for the book’s central thesis. Regarding Poland, he questions whether Stalin’s overall geostrategy left room for a distinctive national path to emerge there. He notes that Italy was neither liberated by the Soviets nor contiguous with territory controlled by them, weakening its usefulness as a comparative case. Koura states that "Greece could be a more fitting example of Stalin’s pragmatism".
