= Frank Knox Memorial Fellowship =

The Frank Knox Memorial Fellowship program is a scholarship program which funds students from Australia, Canada, New Zealand and the United Kingdom to undertake graduate study at Harvard University.

The program is named after the businessman, soldier and politician Frank Knox and was established by his wife, Annie Reid Knox. It is administered by the Committee on General Scholarships at Harvard University. The scholarship program has two primary parts, both associated with graduate schools at Harvard University and administered by the Committee on General Scholarships.

== Frank Knox ==
William Franklin Knox was born in Boston, Massachusetts, on 1 January 1874. He attended Alma College, in Michigan, and served in Cuba with the First Volunteer Cavalry (the "Rough Riders") during the Spanish–American War. Following that conflict, Knox became a newspaper reporter in Grand Rapids, Michigan, the beginning of a career that grew to include the ownership of several papers. He changed his first name to Frank in about 1900. During World War I, Knox was an advocate of preparedness and United States participation. He served as an artillery officer in France after America entered the hostilities.

In 1930, Frank Knox became publisher and part owner of the Chicago Daily News. An active Republican, he joined with the party's presidential nominee Kansas Governor Alf Landon as nominee for Vice President in the 1936 election. Knox, who was an internationalist and supporter of the World War II Allies, became Secretary of the Navy in July 1940, as President Roosevelt strove to create bi-partisan appeal for his foreign and defense policies following the defeat of France.

Knox was an outspoken proponent of cooperation between all English-speaking countries.

== The Fellowships ==
=== Inward-Facing ===
The inward facing part of the scholarship program funds students from Australia, Canada, New Zealand, and the United Kingdom to undertake graduate study at Harvard University. Through in-country competitions, Knox Fellowships are typically awarded to 15 newly admitted graduate students each year. Knox Fellowship funding is guaranteed for up to two years of study at Harvard for students in degree programs requiring more than one year of study. All Knox Fellowship applicants must also apply for admission to the Harvard graduate school of their choice.

=== Outward-Facing ===
The outward facing part of the scholarship program provides funding for graduate students finishing at Harvard University to spend an entire academic year abroad after their graduation. Generally, Knox Fellowships support research and/or study in Commonwealth countries: including Australia, Canada, New Zealand, South Africa, or the United Kingdom. Applicants must be citizens of the United States.

The fellowship award amount changes from year to year. For the 1965–66 academic year, the fellowship award was $3,000. For the 2010–2011 academic year, the fellowship award is $24,000.

=== Administration ===
The inward-facing and outward-facing fellowships are administered independently. The inward-facing fellowship is better publicized, while the outward-facing fellowship is only detailed within the Harvard community.

The outward-facing fellowship is administered jointly with two substantially similar Harvard Fellowships: the Sinclair Kennedy and Fredrick Sheldon Traveling Fellowships. Like Knox, Sinclair Kennedy and Fredrick Sheldon were outspoken proponents of cooperation between the United States and Britain, in a federation of the English-speaking world.

== Past recipients ==
Despite the dearth of a public list of past recipients, it would seem that many of the past Knox fellowship recipients, both inward-facing and outward-facing, have later built reputations as academics or public servants.

For example, a Harvard Crimson article from 1965 lists a host of winners, including Howard E. Gardner (who is now a professor at the Harvard Graduate School of Education) and Alan M. Tartakoff (who is now a professor at Case Western Reserve University Medical School). Fiona Hill, former official at the National Security Council, was also a Frank Knox Memorial Fellow.
