= There Is Nothing for You Here: Finding Opportunity in the 21st Century =

2021 political memoir

- Author: Fiona Hill
- Language: English
- Genre: non-fiction
- Publisher: Mariner Books
- Publication date: October 5, 2021
- Publication place: United States
- Pages: 422
- ISBN: 978-0-358-57431-6

There Is Nothing for You Here: Finding Opportunity in the 21st Century is a 2021 political memoir by British-American political advisor Fiona Hill. It details her early life in England, entering US politics, and continues through the presidency of Donald Trump.
