= Daniel Raymond =

American political economist (1786–1849)

Daniel Raymond (1786–1849) was an early political economist in the United States whose influence shaped the American school of political economy. He authored Thoughts on Political Economy (1820) and The Elements of Political Economy (1823).

== Economic theory ==
He theorized that "labor creates wealth," which may have been an improvement based on the thinking of Adam Smith of Europe. He thought that the economy of England was actually the economy of the higher-ranking members of that society and not the economy of the entire nation. He held that wealth is not an aggregation of exchange values, as Adam Smith had conceived it, but the capacity or the opportunity to acquire the necessaries and conveniences of life by labor.

He systematized the infant industry argument.

== Political theory ==
In 1845, he wrote a book entitled 'The Elements of Constitutional Law' which included basic definitions of a government, a sovereign state, a confederacy and a constitution. While these concepts have evolved, much of the basic theories which he outlined still have relevance in modern political analysis.

His writings affected political developments in the United States.

In his Elements on Political Economy, he represents himself as a protectionist. In Book II Chapter Nine, Of Protecting Duties, he says that protectionism is aligned with national interests and the government should put national interests ahead of individual interests. To Raymond, national interests are never in harmony with individual interests. The protective tariff represents national interests, Raymond conveys, and the advantage of protective tariffs is the leverage of a nation and the special treatment over foreigners in the nation's domestic commerce and industry of the nation.

His policy was opposed by Adam Smith. Raymond believed national interests are monumental and trump individual interests. To Raymond, defending national interests over individual interests was like military strategy. He stated that the primordial perspective is that the army is one and the general the commander. Subordinate troops are not allowed to have the privileges of power or concerns or pursuits that directly oppose the general prosperity of the military unit.

He then conveys that the principle that I political economy, no private interest or right may have authority over the general interest of the country, and if a political economy does not acknowledge that principle, it will forever remain in a dismal state.

Raymond also expounded on his government philosophy. For him, the public good is above all forms of citizens, property, and individual rights. Government can seize private land and lay and collect taxes only in the name of the general good. The government has the right to take away land to use it for internal improvements or infrastructure. In addition, government has the prerogative and the absolute right to establish regulations for property or trade that benefits the general good. Raymond states that protectionism is vehemently opposed to laissez-faire.

In Book II, Chapter VIII, "Monopolies and Colonial Systems," Raymond wrote, "There is no hardship or injustice, in excluding foreign nations from a participation in our domestic trade, but there would be a very great hardship, as well as injustice, in excluding any portion of our own citizens from a participation in it."

=== On unproductive labor ===
In Book I, Chapter XVII, Raymond considered the labor that laissez-faire advocates like not to be worthwhile to civilization. Protectionists understand what is a useful pursuit and what is a blight. Raymond stated that a destructive occupation is a detriment to civilization and that a pursuit fails to help society if it has no ability to increase the standards of the requirements and conveniences of life or to foster the joy and happiness of the society.

Also, he said that when poets, painters and musicians cease to produce innocent enjoyments, they become uncongenial and unproductive. However, he considered the best example of an occupation that never suited society well to be the speculator and the stock-jobber (stock broker): "The object of those employed in these occupations, is not to produce any of the necessaries and comforts of life. Different persons may have other opinions of the moral character of these occupations, but all must agree that they are useless, and unproductive to the community."

He then finished the chapter by stating the duties of man and government: each man must endeavor to foster the longevity of civilization, and no man has the warranted right to be a mindless being, by using his time repugnantly or by engaging in uncongenial pursuit.

For him, government is an imperative concern to stifle all occupations that are grotesque and a blight to mankind and, as much as possible, not to facilitate them.
