= Safeguard =

Restraint to protect home or national industries from foreign competition

In international trade law, a safeguard is a restraint to protect home or national industries from foreign competition. In the World Trade Organization (WTO), a member may take a safeguard action, such as restricting imports of a product temporarily to protect a domestic industry from an increase in imports causing or threatening to cause injury to domestic production.

== Background ==
Within the WTO, safeguard measures were available under the General Agreement on Tariffs and Trade (GATT) (Article XIX). However, they were infrequently used, and some governments preferred to protect their industries by "grey area" measures ("voluntary" export restraint arrangements on products such as cars, steel and semiconductors). As part of the WTO deal, members gave up the "grey area" measures and adopted a specific WTO Safeguards Agreement to discipline the use of safeguard measures.

Safeguards are usually seen as responses to economic development and trade processes that align with international law, as opposed to negative practices, such as dumping or subsidies.

In the context of world trade, they are supposed to be used only in very specific circumstances, with compensation, and on a universal basis. For example, a member restricting imports for safeguard purposes would have to restrict imports from all other countries. However, exceptions to the nondiscriminatory rule are provided for in the Agreement on Safeguards itself as well as in some ad hoc agreements. In the last respect, it is worthwhile to note that the People's Republic of China accepted that discriminatory safeguards may be imposed on its exports to other WTO members until 2013.

== Examples ==
Some safeguard measures can be resorted to in the area of services, as provided for in the General Agreement on Trade in Services (GATS).

Regional trading arrangements have their own rules relating to safeguards. One example of a safeguard being used successfully was when Liechtenstein used a safeguard measure in the EEA Agreement with the European Union to limit immigration from the EU until a more permanent agreement was put in place to limit immigration.

Article 16 of the Northern Ireland Protocol is a more wide ranging safeguard measure affecting the relationship of Northern Ireland, the United Kingdom and the European Union after Brexit.

== See also ==
- Escape clause
- World Trade Organization (WTO)
- IAEA safeguards (Supporting the Treaty on the Non-Proliferation of Nuclear Weapons)
