= The Siberian Curse =

2003 book by Hill and Gaddy

- Author: Fiona Hill; Clifford Gaddy
- Publisher: Bloomsbury Publishing
- Publication date: 11 April 2003
- ISBN: 9780815796183

The Siberian Curse: How Communist Planners Left Russia Out in the Cold is a book written by Fiona Hill and Clifford G. Gaddy, two political scientists and fellows of the Brookings Institution in 2003.

In the book they propose the thesis that Siberia, while one of the most resource-abundant regions in the world, is too big and harsh to be populated and industrialized on an economically rational basis. Consequently, since the collapse of the USSR, which planned and subsidized Siberian towns, a westward exodus to the urban European part of Russia is occurring. The large territory, they state, is not one of the greatest sources of strength of Russia, but one of its greatest weaknesses.

== Reception ==
Robert Legvold, reviewing the book for Foreign Affairs, said that the authors "argue well with ample data to back them up" that the Russian, and particularly Soviet, efforts to develop Siberia "have always been economic folly." According to Legvold, the authors recommend that Russia try to draw its population to large urban areas in warmer regions, and treat Siberia as a "commodity-producing hinterland" akin to Northern Canada.

In contrast, John Dolan, writing for The eXile, described the book as a "classic California-style real-estate scam" built on overly-simplistic "fake math" social science, aiming in his eyes to convince Russians that Siberia was worthless so that "corrupt developers" could buy it up at low prices. He felt the authors were also trying to divert blame for Russia's economic woes onto Siberia and away from the more-rightful target of "incompetent, sleazy Western consultant[s]" like Jeffrey Sachs, whose endorsement of the book he described as self-serving.

== See also ==
- Demography of Russia
- Gulag
- Magnitogorsk
- Sino-Soviet border conflict
- Vladivostok
- Zek
- Why Russia is not America
