= Roman Szporluk =

Ukrainian-American historian (born 1933)

Roman Szporluk (Ukrainian: Роман Шпорлюк, Schporlyuk; born 8 September 1933) is a Ukrainian-American political scientist and historian. He is a professor emeritus at Harvard and the University of Michigan. He has written several books and many papers.

== Biography ==
Szporluk was born in Grzymałów (Kopychyntsi county, Tarnopol voivodeship in Poland, now Hrymailiv in the Ternopil region, Ukraine) and studied in Lublin after World War II at Maria Curie-Skłodowska University graduating in 1955. He did post-graduate work for three years and then headed west in 1958 studying political thought at Oxford University in 1961 under Sir Isaiah Berlin and John Plamenatz and at Stanford.

From 1965 until 1991, he worked at the University of Michigan in Ann Arbor as a professor of history. There he also was a Director of the Center for Russian and Eastern European Studies at the University of Michigan.

He was then a professor of history at Harvard University including as director of the Harvard Ukrainian Research Institute from 1991 until 2004.

=== Membership ===
Szporluk was one of Fiona Hill's PhD advisors.

Member of the Ukrainian Free Academy of Sciences in the United States.

Member of the Board of the American Association for the Advancement of Slavic Studies (1976–1979).

Member of the Polish Society of Sciences and Arts in New York and other scientific societies.

Foreign Member of the National Academy of Sciences of Ukraine.

Professor Emeritus of the National University of Kyiv-Mohyla Academy.

Member of the Shevchenko Scientific Society.

== Academic work ==
Szporluk's expertise is in Ukrainian history, Polish-Ukrainian relations, Marxism, and nationalism in Central and Eastern Europe.

He is the compiler and editor of the selected articles by M. Pokrovsky ("Russian in World History", 1970) and the combined work "The Influence of Eastern Europe and the Soviet West on the USSR" (1975).

== Selected published works ==
- The Political Thought of T.G. Masaryk
- Communism and Nationalism: Karl Marx versus Friedrich List
- Russia, Ukraine, and the Breakup of the Soviet Union
- U poshukakh maibutnioho chasu ("In Search of Future Time" (in Ukrainian, 2010)

== Further research ==
- Szporluk delivering the August Zaleski lecture on Modern Ukrainian History 1795–1991 in 2012
