= Dieter Senghaas =

German social scientist and peace researcher

Dieter Senghaas (born 27 August 1940 in Geislingen an der Steige) is a German social scientist and peace researcher.

== Biography ==
After studying political science, social science, philosophy and history from 1960 to 1967, Senghaas received his doctorate in Frankfurt in 1967 (with Ludwig von Friedeburg as his second examiner). His dissertation, Kritik der Abschreckung (Criticism of Deterrence), dealt with the field which has characterised his scientific activities since then: international relations, especially peace research, research on developing countries and conflict research. His studies were followed by work as an assistant at the Johann Wolfgang Goethe University in Frankfurt until 1968, and then a research residency in the USA with Karl W. Deutsch at Harvard University, among others, until 1970. From 1972 until 1978, Senghaas was leader of a research group at the Hessische Stiftung Friedens- und Konfliktforschung (Hessian Foundation for Peace and Conflict Research) and professor at the University of Frankfurt during that same period. Since 1978, he has been a professor at the University of Bremen and also active there at the Institut für interkulturelle und internationale Studien (Institute for Intercultural and International Studies). In 1986/1987 and 1992/1994, Dieter Senghaas was a research professor at the Stiftung Wissenschaft und Politik (Foundation of Science and Politics). Since 1995, Senghaas has been a member of the advisory council of the Bundesakademie für Sicherheitspolitik (Federal Academy for Security Policies) in Bonn. In 1999, Senghaas was awarded the Göttinger Friedenspreis (Göttingen Peace Prize) of the Dr. Roland Röhl Foundation.

== Scientific work ==
=== Work concerning the East-West conflict ===
In the 1960s and the beginning of the 1970s, Senghaas took a close look at the armament dynamics and the system of deterrence in the East-West conflict. Senghaas recognised an autistic structure in the deterrence situation of the Cold War, which according to Senghaas, was mostly driven from the inside and less from the outside (international processes). Senghaas' criticism of deterrence and his analysis of armament dynamics and control contributed to the development of critical peace research.

=== Work concerning the North-South conflict ===
In his three compilations, "Imperialismus und strukturelle Gewalt (1972)" (Imperialism and Structural Power), "Peripherer Kapitalismus. Analysen über Abhängigkeit und Unterentwicklung (1974)" (Peripheral Capitalism. Analyses of Dependency and Underdevelopment) and "Kapitalistische Weltökonomie. Kontroversen über ihren Ursprung und ihre Entwicklungsdynamik (1979)" (Capitalistic World Economy. Controversies about its Origin and its Development Dynamics), as well as in his 1977 book, "Weltwirtschaftsordnung und Entwicklungspolitik. Plädoyer für Dissoziation" (World Economic Order and Development Policy. Plea for Dissociation), Senghaas attempts to make visible the structural dependency of the periphery on the metropolises, or stated more simply, the dependence of the developing countries (or areas) on the political and economic power centers in the age of world economy. Senghaas sees a solution to the impediments to development, created externally (pressure of the industrial countries) and internally (interests of the power elite in keeping the existing societal structures), in a decoupling (not severance!) at times from the world market. In this decoupling phase, the concentration should be upon the development of the economic form of the developing countries, which should be the satisfaction of the local population, if possible exploiting local resources (with which Senghaas does not mean striving for economic self-sufficiency). With this way of looking at things, Senghaas also simultaneously rejected the idea prevalent at that time that simply integrating the Third World into the existing world economic order could solve the development problems of the Third World. As of the middle of the 1970s, Senghaas attempted to strengthen his theory by analysing the developing socialist countries of Albania, the People's Republic of China, North Korea and Cuba. For Senghaas, socialism did not represent a post-capitalist production system. Much more (independently of the intentions of the respective leader or regime), socialism could accomplish an economic development, which would not have been possible in that way under capitalistic conditions. In his analysis, Senghaas came to the conclusion that the development of states proceeded positively in the beginning, but then came increasingly to a standstill due to the absence of reforms, a more and more complex system of business and society and an increasingly inflexible political order (results in the middle of the 1980s). From the results of the analysis, several country monographs and an article on the status of socialism regarding historical development were created in cooperations with Frankfurt graduate students. Dieter Senghaas decisively left his mark on the discussion of theoretical development within international relations in Germany with his works about the possibilities of independent development processes in dependency of the given international conditions (economic and political).

=== The civilizational hexagon ===
Dieter Senghaas' "civilizational hexagon" joins load-bearing building blocks together for a stable maintenance of peace. This peacekeeping and its supervision of itself is regarded as a civilising project. The hexagon consists of six building blocks, which are all linked to each other, since they all depend on each other. A fundamental building block is the monopoly on the use of force, which means the de-privatisation of force and its authorization, that is, "disarmament of the citizens". The next building block, the rule of law, comprises the control of the monopoly of force, which has as a precondition that the public monopoly of force is not despotically abused. Since without a check on the monopoly of force, it would be nothing less than a dictatorship. The third building block, democratic participation, means democratic involvement of the public in elections and other decision making, since without this right of the people to contribute, they would not obey the professed laws. The trust of the people must also be secured by equal rights, so that they comply with such regulations. This occurs, among other things, through the building block of social justice, which provides for a just verdict from a neutral court when there is a violation of the law, but also takes care of safeguarding the basic necessities of every person. The next building block falls under the heading of constructive conflict culture, which describes the capability for tolerance in a multi-cultural society and a willingness for compromise-oriented conflict solution. The last building block of the hexagon is interdependencies and control of emotion. The purpose of this building block is the mutual dependency among people and their control of themselves in conflict situations.

== Publications ==
- Abschreckung und Frieden. Studien zur Kritik organisierter Friedlosigkeit, Frankfurt: Europäische Verlagsanstalt 1969 (3rd expanded edition. 1981)
- Politikwissenschaft. Eine Einführung in ihre Probleme, Frankfurt: Europäische Verlagsanstalt 1969 (4th edition. Fischer Verlag 1973) (co-editor)
- Bibliographie zur Friedensforschung, ed. by G. Scharffenorth and W. Huber, Stuttgart/Munich: Kösel und Kaiser Verlag 1970 (2nd edition. 1973) (coauthor)
- Zur Pathologie des Rüstungswettlaufs, Freiburg: Rombach Verlag 1970 (ed.)
- Friedensforschung und Gesellschaftskritik, Munich: Hanser Verlag 1970 (2nd edition. Frankfurt: Fischer Verlag 1973) (ed.)
- Texte zur Technokratiediskussion, Frankfurt: Europäische Verlagsanstalt 1970 (2nd edition. 1971) (co-editor)
- Kritische Friedensforschung, Frankfurt: Suhrkamp Verlag 1971 (6th edition. 1981) (ed.)
- Aggressivität und kollektive Gewalt, Stuttgart: Verlag Kohlhammer 1971 (2nd edition. 1972)
- Aufrüstung durch Rüstungskontrolle. Über den symbolischen Gebrauch von Politik, Stuttgart: Verlag Kohlhammer 1972
- Imperialismus und strukturelle Gewalt, Frankfurt: Suhrkamp Verlag 1972 (7th edition. 1987) (ed.)
- Rüstung und Militarismus, Frankfurt: Suhrkamp Verlag 1972 (2nd edition. 1982)
- Jahrbuch für Friedens- und Konfliktforschung, Vol. 2, Düsseldorf: Bertelsmann Verlag 1972 (co-editor)
- Frieden in Europa? Zur Koexistenz von Rüstung und Entspannung, Reinbek bei Hamburg: Rowohlt Verlag 1973 (coauthor)
- Peace Research in the Federal Republic of Germany, Journal of Peace Research 3/1973 (special issue) (ed.)
- Kann Europa abrüsten? Friedenspolitische Optionen der siebziger Jahre, Munich: Carl Hanser Verlag 1973 (co-editor)
- Gewalt-Konflikt-Frieden. Essays zur Friedensforschung, Hamburg: Hoffmann & Campe Verlag 1974
- Overcoming Underdevelopment, Journal of Peace Research 4/1975 (special issue) (ed.)
- Peripherer Kapitalismus. Analysen über Abhängigkeit und Unterentwicklung, Frankfurt: Suhrkamp Verlag 1974 (2nd edition. 1977) (ed.)
- Probleme des Friedens, der Sicherheit und der Zusammenarbeit, Cologne: Pahl-Rugenstein Verlag 1975 (co-editor)
- Multinationale Konzerne und Dritte Welt, Wiesbaden: Westdeutscher Verlag 1976 (co-editor)
- Weltwirtschaftsordnung und Entwicklungspolitik. Plädoyer für Dissoziation, Frankfurt: Suhrkamp Verlag 1977 (5th edition. 1987)
- Strukturelle Abhängigkeit und Unterentwicklung. Unterrichtsvorschläge, Frankfurt: HSFK-Studie 1–3, 1978 (co-author)
- Kapitalistische Weltökonomie. Kontroversen über ihren Ursprung und ihre Entwicklungsdynamik, Frankfurt: Suhrkamp Verlag 1979 (2nd edition. 1982) (ed.)
- Strukturelle Abhängigkeit und Unterentwicklung am Beispiel Mozambiques, Bonn: Verlag Wegener 1980 (coauthor)
- Sozialismus-Diskussion. Eine Fortsetzung, Schwerpunktheft des Leviathan, Vol. 9, 1981, No. 2 (ed.)
- Wiedersehen mit China nach zwei Jahren, Saarbrücken: Breitenbach-Verlag 1981 (co-editor)
- Von Europa lernen. Entwicklungsgeschichtliche Betrachtungen, Frankfurt: Suhrkamp Verlag 1982
- Auf dem Wege zu einer Neuen Weltwirtschaftsordnung? Bedingungen und Grenzen für eine eigenständige Entwicklung. Baden-Baden: Nomos Verlag 1983 (co-editor)
- Die Zukunft Europas. Probleme der Friedensgestaltung, Frankfurt: Suhrkamp Verlag 1986
- Europas Entwicklung und die Dritte Welt. Eine Bestandsaufnahme, Frankfurt: Suhrkamp Verlag 1986 (2nd edition. 1991) (coauthor)
- The Quest for Peace. Transcending Collective Violence and War among Societies, Cultures and States, London: Sage 1987 (co-editor)
- Konfliktformationen im internationalen System, Frankfurt: Suhrkamp Verlag 1988
- Regionalkonflikte in der Dritten Welt. Fremdbestimmung und Autonomie, Baden-Baden: Nomos Verlag 1989 (ed.)
- Europa 2000. Ein Friedensplan. Frankfurt: Suhrkamp Verlag 1990 (2nd edition. 1991)
- Die Welt nach dem Ost-West-Konflikt. Geschichte und Prognosen, Berlin: Akademie-Verlag 1990 (co-editor)
- Friedensforschung in Deutschland. Lagebeurteilung und Perspektiven für die neunziger Jahre, Bonn: Arbeitsstelle Friedensforschung Bonn 1990 (co-editor)
- Soziale Verteidigung. Konstruktive Konfliktaustragung. Kritik und Gegenkritik, Frankfurt: Verlag Haag + Herchen 1991 (Military policy. Documentation issue 89/81) (coauthor)
- Friedensprojekt Europa, Frankfurt: Suhrkamp Verlag 1992 (3rd edition. 1996)
- Wohin driftet die Welt? Über die Zukunft friedlicher Koexistenz, Frankfurt: Suhrkamp Verlag 1994 (2nd edition. 1996)
- Den Frieden denken. Si vis pacem, para pacem, Frankfurt: Suhrkamp Verlag 1995. (ed.)
- Frieden machen, Frankfurt: Suhrkamp Verlag 1997 (ed.).
- Zivilisierung wider Willen. Der Konflikt der Kulturen mit sich selbst. Frankfurt: Suhrkamp Verlag 1998 (2nd edition. 1998)
- Klänge des Friedens. Ein Hörbericht – Annäherung an den Frieden über klassische Musik, Frankfurt: Suhrkamp Verlag 2001
- Friedensprojekt Europa, 2002
- Friedenspolitik. Ethische Grundlagen internationaler Beziehungen, Munich: Piper Verlag 2003 (co-editor)
- Zum irdischen Frieden, Erkenntnisse und Vermutungen, Frankfurt: Suhrkamp Verlag 2004
- Vom hörbaren Frieden, 2004
- The Civilisation of Conflict: Constructive Pacifism as a Guiding Notion for Conflict Transformation, in: Transforming Ethnopolitical Conflict. The Berghof Handbook. Edited by Alex Austin, Martina Fischer & Norbert Ropers. Wiesbaden: VS Verlag, 2004, 26-39. Also available online at Berghof Handbook for Conflict Transformation

== Literature ==
- Frank Nullmeier, Michael Zürn: Wissenschaft als Beruf – Zwei Vorträge über Dieter Senghaas. In: Leviathan. Vol. XXXIII, 2005, Issue 4, p. 423–463.
- Lukas Mengelkamp: Deterrence as "Organized Peacelessness". In: Sources and Methods (History and Public Policy Program, Wilson Center), 14.05.2020.
