= First impeachment trial of Donald Trump =

2020 trial in the US Senate

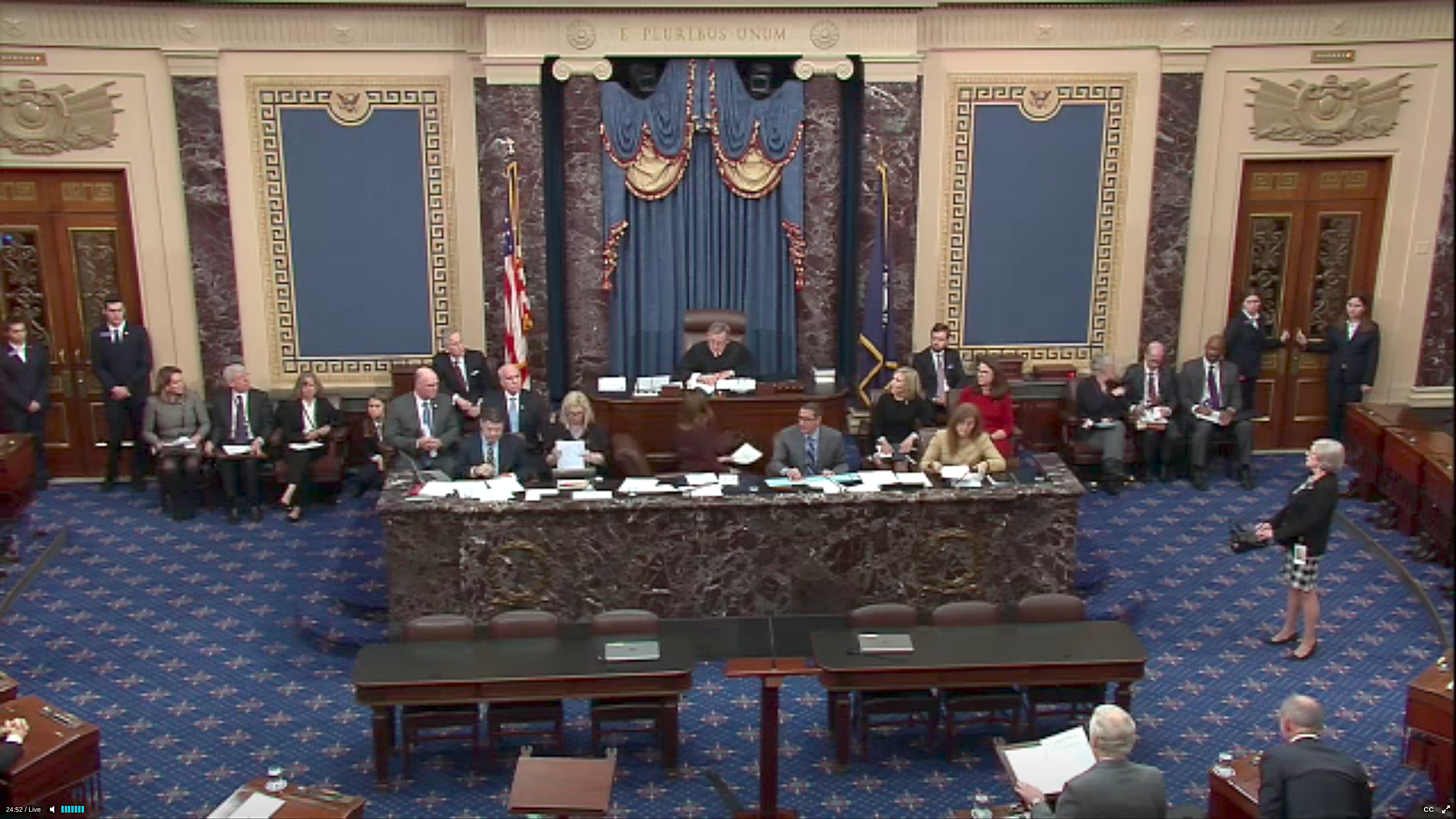
- Chief Justice John Roberts presides over the first impeachment trial of Donald Trump.
- Date: January 16 – February 5, 2020 (2 weeks and 6 days)
- Accused: Donald Trump, 45th president of the United States
- Presiding officer: Chief Justice John Roberts
- House managers: Adam Schiff (lead manager); Jason Crow; Val Demings; Sylvia Garcia; Hakeem Jeffries; Zoe Lofgren; Jerry Nadler
- Defense counsel: Pat Cipollone (White House Counsel); Pam Bondi; Alan Dershowitz; Eric Herschmann; Patrick F. Philbin; Michael Purpura; Jane Raskin; Robert Ray; Jay Sekulow; Ken Starr
- Outcome: Acquitted by the U.S. Senate, remained in the office of President of the United States
- Charges: Abuse of power; Obstruction of Congress
- Cause: Allegations that Trump sought help from Ukrainian authorities to favor him in the 2020 U.S. presidential election

The first impeachment trial of Donald Trump, the 45th president of the United States, began in the U.S. Senate on January 16, 2020, and concluded with his acquittal on February 5. After an inquiry between September and November 2019, Trump was impeached by the U.S. House of Representatives on December 18, 2019; the articles of impeachment charged him with abuse of power and obstruction of Congress. It was the third impeachment trial of a U.S. president, preceded by those of Andrew Johnson and of Bill Clinton. (Note: Richard Nixon resigned before he could be impeached and put on trial.)

The Republican majority voted on January 21 to reject 11 amendments proposed by Democrats which requested subpoena authority to introduce testimony from current and former White House officials, as well as Trump administration documents which were not provided to House investigators.

The prosecution made its opening arguments on January 22–24, and the defense made its arguments on January 25–28. This was followed by a period of questions, answers, and debate on January 29–31. On January 31, a majority of 51 senators (all Republicans) voted against allowing subpoenas to call witnesses or documents.

On February 5, the Senate acquitted Trump on both impeachment articles, as neither article obtained the support of a two-thirds supermajority of senators. Fifty-two Republican senators voted against the charge of abuse of power, and all fifty-three voted against the charge of obstruction of Congress. Mitt Romney became the first U.S. senator in history to cast a vote to convict and remove a president of his own political party from office.

On January 13, 2021, the House of Representatives voted to start a second impeachment trial of Trump, following the January 6 United States Capitol attack. The Senate acquitted Trump a second time on February 13, 2021.

== Background ==
The articles of impeachment against President Trump

Under the U.S. Constitution, the House has the sole power of impeachment (Article I, Section 2, Clause 5), and after that action has been taken, the Senate has the sole power to hold the trial for all impeachments (Article I, Section 3, Clause 6). Trump is the third U.S. president to face a Senate impeachment trial, after Andrew Johnson and Bill Clinton.

=== Early planning ===
After the emergence of Trump's phone call with Ukrainian president Volodymyr Zelenskyy, House leadership came to the conclusion that impeachment might be advisable, and began an inquiry.

As this was happening, Senate Majority Leader Mitch McConnell was quietly planning a possible trial. On October 8, 2019, he led a meeting on the subject, advising the Republican Senators to craft their responses according to their own political needs. McConnell proposed two potential avenues: state opposition to the House process, or refuse to comment due to being potential jurors.

=== Republican plans ===
As the articles of impeachment moved to a vote before the full House and referral to the Senate for trial, Mitch McConnell met with White House Counsel Pat Cipollone and White House Congressional Liaison Eric Ueland, later stating, "Everything I do during this I'm coordinating with the White House counsel. There will be no difference between the president's position and our position as to how to handle this ... I'm going to take my cues from the president's lawyers." As part of the "total coordination", McConnell said the president's lawyers could decide if witnesses would be called for the trial. McConnell also said there was "no chance" the Senate would convict Trump and remove him from office, while declaring his wish that all Senate Republicans would acquit Trump of both charges. On December 14, Judiciary Committee chairman Lindsey Graham said, "I am trying to give a pretty clear signal I have made up my mind. I'm not trying to pretend to be a fair juror here ... I will do everything I can to make [the impeachment trial] die quickly." Three days later, McConnell said, "I'm not an impartial juror. This is a political process. There is not anything judicial about it. Impeachment is a political decision." The Constitution mandates senators to take an impeachment oath, in which by Senate rules is stated, "I will do impartial justice according to the Constitution and laws, so help me God."

=== December 2019 ===
On December 15, Senate minority leader Chuck Schumer, in a letter to McConnell, called for Mick Mulvaney, Robert Blair, (Note: One of Mulvaney's top aides until being promoted by Trump on December 23 to a special representative for global telecommunications policy.) John Bolton (Note: The former national security advisor did not attend his scheduled House deposition on November 7, 2019, and his lawyer threatened to take legal action if he was subpoenaed. According to a House Intelligence Committee official, this is evidence of the president's obstruction of Congress. On January 6, 2020, Bolton said he would be willing to testify in the Senate trial if subpoenaed. However, Trump has said he would invoke executive privilege to keep him from testifying.) and Michael Duffey to testify in the expected Senate trial, and suggested that pre-trial proceedings take place on January 6, 2020. Two days later, McConnell rejected the call for witnesses to testify, saying the Senate's job is only to judge, not to investigate. Schumer quickly replied, citing bipartisan public support for the testimony of witnesses who could fill in gaps caused by Trump preventing his staff from testifying in the House investigation.

On December 17, McConnell opened the Senate session with a half-hour long speech denouncing the impeachment, calling it "the most rushed, least thorough, and most unfair in modern history", and "fundamentally unlike any articles that any prior House of Representatives has ever passed". Schumer replied that he "did not hear a single sentence, a single argument as to why the witnesses I suggested should not give testimony" in the potential Senate trial.

Citing a need to "[s]ee what the process is on the Senate side", on December 18, the day of the impeachment, Speaker of the House Nancy Pelosi declined to commit to when, or even if, the impeachment resolution would be transmitted to the Senate, saying that "[s]o far we haven't seen anything that looks fair to us." The entire legislative branch adjourned for winter break later that day without taking action to schedule the Senate trial. The following day, McConnell and Schumer briefly met to discuss the trial.

=== January 2020 ===
Lindsey Graham proposed that he and McConnell "change the rules of the Senate so we could start the trial without [Pelosi], if necessary". On January 7, McConnell announced that he had the caucus backing to pass a blueprint for the trial, which discusses witnesses and evidence after the opening arguments. Pelosi called for the resolution to be published before she could proceed with the next steps, but McConnell asserted the House had no leverage and that there would be no negotiating over the trial. This prompted several Democratic senators to voice their readiness to have the trial begin. On January 9, Pelosi said she would deliver the articles soon, but continued to cite a need for Republican transparency in the Senate; the same day, McConnell informed members of his caucus that he expected the trial to begin the next week, and Senator Josh Hawley announced that McConnell had signed on as a co-sponsor to his resolution to dismiss articles of impeachment not sent to the Senate within 25 days. On January 10, Pelosi announced that she and Jerry Nadler were prepared to bring a resolution to appoint managers and transmit the articles of impeachment to the House floor in the next week.

On January 6, John Bolton, the former national security advisor in the White House, said he was "prepared to testify" if subpoenaed by the Senate for the impeachment trial. (Note: The House had invited Bolton to testify during the impeachment inquiry, but after Bolton's former deputy, Charles Kupperman—who shares a lawyer with Bolton—filed a lawsuit in response to being subpoenaed, the House decided not to subpoena Bolton.) On January 23, as Bolton was preparing for possible Senate testimony about the assertions in the manuscript for his yet-to-be-published book, the National Security Council told him it contained classified information which "may not be published or otherwise disclosed". Bolton's attorney said he did not believe the manuscript contained sensitive information. The dispute set the stage for a prolonged review, with Bolton's attorney asking that access to the manuscript be limited to "those career government officials and employees regularly charged with responsibility for such reviews". On January 26, The New York Times reported that Bolton had written in his book that in August 2019, Trump told Bolton he would continue withholding $391 million in security aid to Ukraine until it assisted with investigations into Democrats, including Joe and Hunter Biden. The Associated Press independently confirmed the report a day later, while Trump labeled Bolton's claims as false (despite admitting he had not read the manuscript). On January 31, The New York Times reported that Bolton's book also described a May 2019 meeting where Trump, in the presence of Pat Cipollone, Mick Mulvaney and Rudy Giuliani, asked Bolton to call Zelenskyy to set up a meeting between him and Giuliani.

On January 31, the lawyer for Lev Parnas sent a letter to McConnell stating that Parnas was ready to testify before the Senate with information "directly relevant to the President's impeachment inquiry", including physical evidence of documents and messages. Parnas would be able to testify on the efforts to "remove Ambassador Marie Yovanovitch and gather 'dirt' on Joe and Hunter Biden", as well as his own actions "at the direction of Mr. Giuliani, on behalf of" President Trump, which included Parnas' trips to Ukraine and meetings with aides of the Ukrainian president to convey a quid pro quo. Parnas would be able to testify on his own direct conversations with Trump, as well as conversations between Trump and Giuliani that Parnas overheard. According to the letter, Parnas knew of "the pressure [Trump] was placing upon Ambassador Bolton to assist in resolving the apparent unwillingness of [Ukrainian] President Zelenskiy to abide by [Trump's] wishes." (Note: Parnas also had information on Vice President Mike Pence, former energy secretary Rick Perry, Secretary of State Mike Pompeo, Attorney General William Barr, Senator Lindsey Graham, Republican Representative Devin Nunes, Nunes' aide Derek Harvey, journalist John Solomon, pro-Trump lawyers Joe diGenova and Victoria Toensing, and the pro-Trump super PAC America First.)

== Officers of the trial ==
=== Presiding officer ===
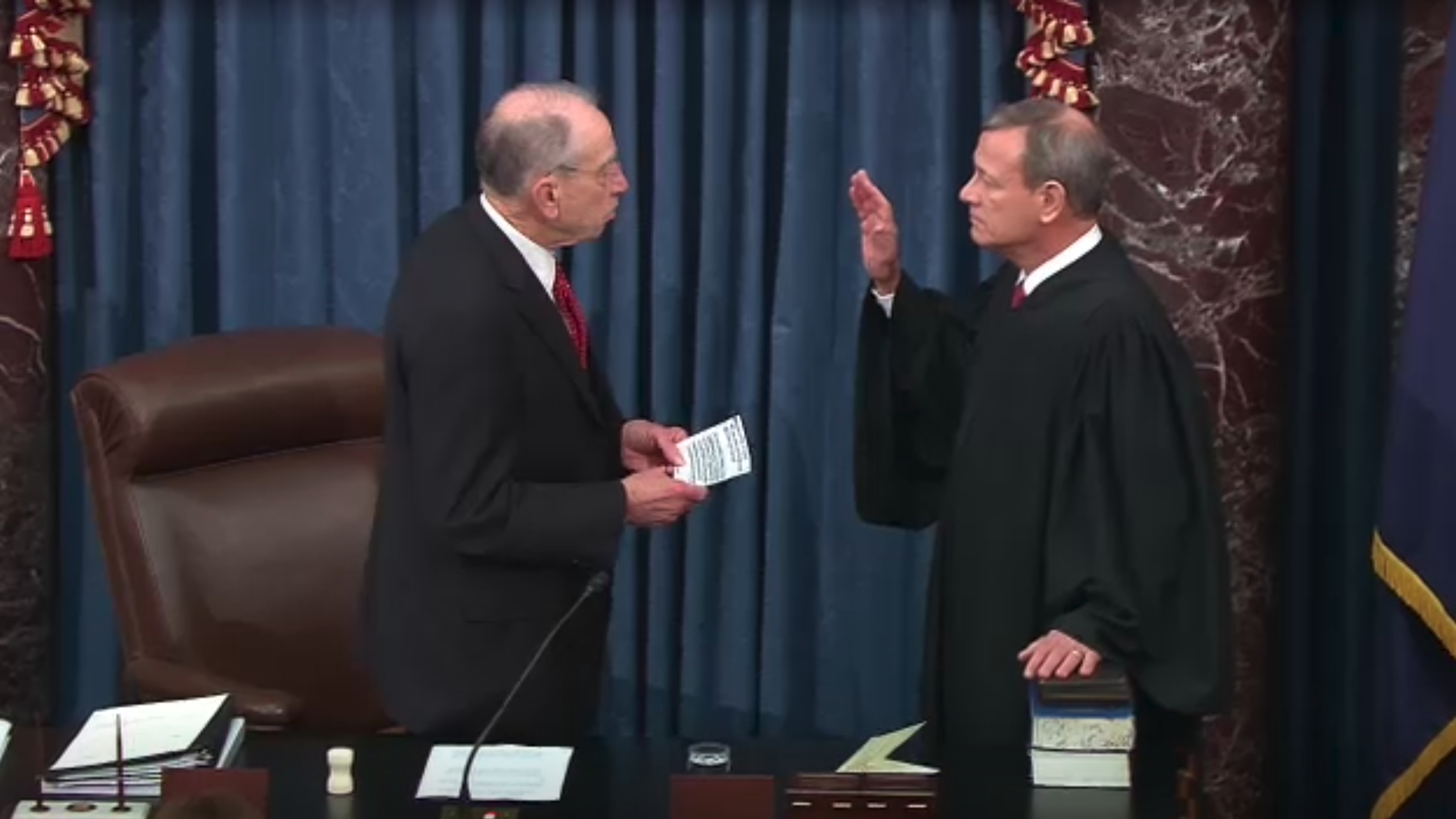
Senator Chuck Grassley administers the oath of office to Chief Justice John Roberts on January 16, 2020.

The Chief Justice is cited in Article I, Section 3, Clause 6 of the United States Constitution as the presiding officer in an impeachment trial of the President. As such, Chief Justice John Roberts assumed that role and was sworn in by Senate President pro tempore Chuck Grassley on January 16, 2020. He immediately administered the oath, as required by Rule XXV, to 99 of the senators in attendance. (Note: Oklahoma Senator Jim Inhofe was attending to a family emergency, but would take the oath upon returning to DC.)

As in all parliamentary proceedings in the Senate, Justice Roberts is advised on procedural matters by Elizabeth MacDonough, Parliamentarian of the United States Senate.

=== House managers ===
The House managers, who conducted the prosecution, were named by Speaker Nancy Pelosi on January 15, and formally appointed by the House of Representatives later that same day by a vote of 228–193.

House managers
Lead manager Adam Schiff (Democrat, California)	Jerry Nadler (Democrat, New York)	Zoe Lofgren (Democrat, California)	Hakeem Jeffries (Democrat, New York)	Val Demings (Democrat, Florida)	Jason Crow (Democrat, Colorado)	Sylvia Garcia (Democrat, Texas)

The seven congressmembers were chosen for their legal and national security experience and for geographic, racial, and gender diversity. Schiff had helped lead the impeachment inquiry as chairman of the House Intelligence Committee, while Nadler oversaw the drafting of the articles of impeachment in the House Judiciary Committee. Lofgren had been a staffer on the Judiciary Committee during Nixon's impeachment inquiry. Jeffries is the chairman of the House Democratic Caucus, the fifth-ranking member of the Democratic leadership. Demings is the former chief of police in Orlando, and is one of two Democrats on both the Intelligence and Judiciary committees. Crow was one of the "national security" freshman Democrats who co-authored an op-ed in The Washington Post calling for an impeachment inquiry. Garcia was a municipal judge in Houston.

=== Trump counsel and congressional defense team ===
The White House formally announced its Senate trial counsel as being led by White House Counsel Pat Cipollone and Jay Sekulow, alongside Ken Starr, Alan Dershowitz, Pam Bondi, Jane Raskin, Eric Herschmann, and Robert Ray on January 17. Additionally, Michael Purpura and Patrick Philbin participated in the trial.

On January 20, the White House named eight House Republicans to serve on Trump's defense team: Doug Collins, Mike Johnson, Jim Jordan, Debbie Lesko, Mark Meadows, John Ratcliffe, Elise Stefanik, and Lee Zeldin.

President's counsel
White House Counsel Pat Cipollone	Jay Sekulow	Ken Starr	Alan Dershowitz	Pam Bondi
Jane Raskin	Eric Herschmann	Robert Ray	Patrick F. Philbin	Michael Purpura

Congressional defense team
Doug Collins (Georgia)	Mike Johnson (Louisiana)	Jim Jordan (Ohio)	Debbie Lesko (Arizona)
Mark Meadows (North Carolina)	John Ratcliffe (Texas)	Elise Stefanik (New York)	Lee Zeldin (New York)

== Opening formalities ==
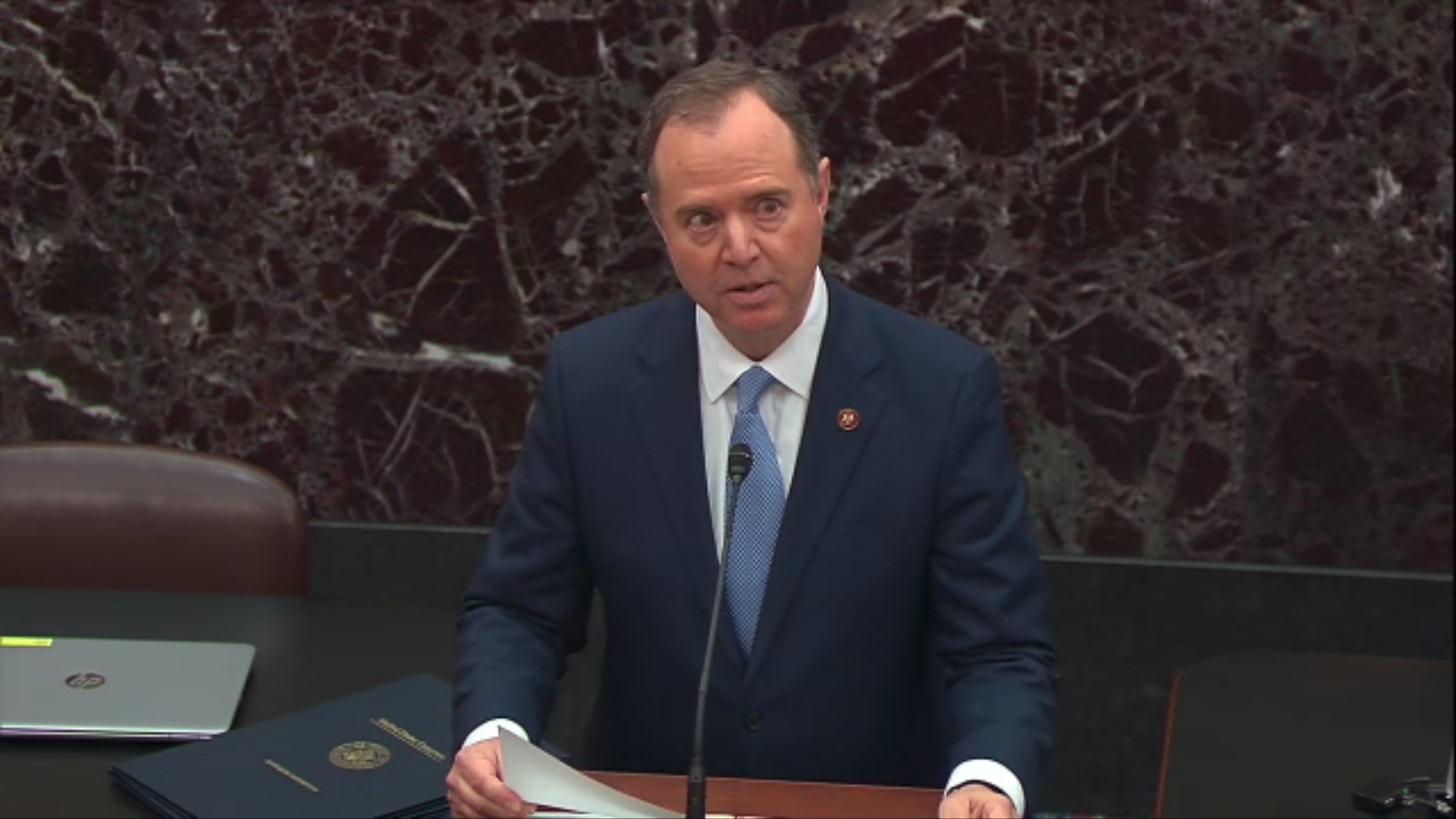
Representative Adam Schiff reads the Articles of Impeachment before the Senate.

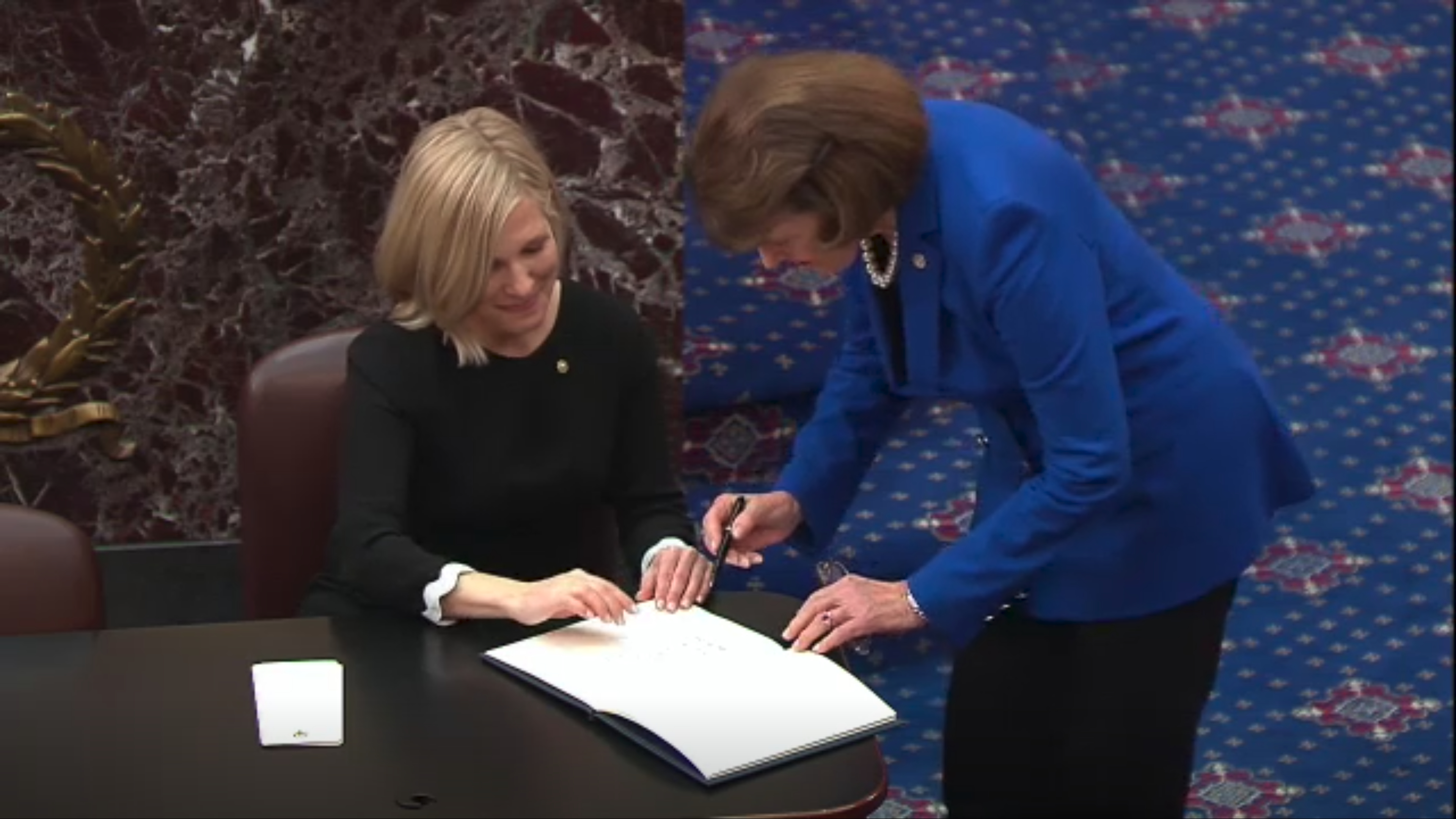
Senator Dianne Feinstein signs the oath book.

Article I, Section 3, Clause 6 of the U.S. Constitution states that "The Senate shall have the sole Power to try all Impeachments." Per the Senate's impeachment rules adopted in 1986, the submission of the articles to the Senate initiated the trial. Speaker Pelosi signed the articles of impeachment on January 15 and gave them to the sergeant-at-arms, who along with House Clerk Cheryl Johnson, and the managers, delivered them to the Senate where Johnson entered the chamber and announced to Grassley and the Senate leadership that President Trump had indeed been impeached and must stand trial.

Once this happened, Grassley told the managers and their entourage to leave and return at noon the following day. They left and at the appointed hour repeated a version of the ceremony. Some Republicans criticized Pelosi for giving congressmen the pens used to sign the articles of impeachment, which have her name printed on them. McConnell commented, "It was a transparently partisan performance from beginning to end."

For this trial, the Senate President pro tempore swears in the chamber's presiding officer, the Chief Justice of the United States, who then swore in all senators who will act as jurors. Each is required to take the following oath (or affirmation):

I solemnly swear (or affirm, as the case may be) that in all things appertaining to the trial of the impeachment of Donald John Trump, President of the United States, now pending, I will do impartial justice according to the Constitution and laws: So help me God.

The Senate sergeant-at-arms, Michael Stenger, then read aloud the following proclamation to mark the beginning of the proceedings:

Hear ye! Hear ye! Hear ye! All persons are commanded to keep silent, on pain of imprisonment, while the House of Representatives is exhibiting to the Senate of the United States articles of impeachment against Donald John Trump, President of the United States.

With the ceremonial beginning over, the Senate adjourned for the Martin Luther King Jr. Day recess beginning the following day. In the meantime, the Senate chamber was modified to resemble a courtroom. The House impeachment managers began their opening presentation at 1:00 p.m. EST on January 22.

== Trial memoranda and responses ==
Trial Memorandum of the House of Representatives

Answer of President Trump to the Trial Memorandum of the House of Representatives

Replication of the House of Representatives to the Answer of President Trump

Trial Memorandum of President Donald Trump

Answer of the House of Representatives to the Trial Memorandum of President Donald Trump

On January 18, 2020, the House trial managers released a 111-page trial memorandum, which included new evidence from after Trump was impeached, such as the Government Accountability Office's conclusion that it was illegal for the Trump administration to have withheld military aid to Ukraine without informing Congress—a violation of the Impoundment Control Act of 1974. Trump attorneys released a six-page response to the articles of impeachment, criticizing what they described as a "lawless process", while not directly addressing the allegations that Trump withheld military aid and a White House meeting from Ukraine in an attempt to have Ukraine announce investigations of Joe Biden and Hunter Biden. On January 20, House trial managers released a 9-page rebuttal to the original Trump response, rejecting the claim that Trump cannot be removed from office "even if the House proves every claim in the Articles of impeachment", as they argued that the Constitution "allows the Senate to remove Presidents who, like President Trump, abuse their power to cheat in elections, betray our national security, and ignore checks and balances".

Also on January 20, Trump attorneys released a 110-page trial memorandum. The memorandum asserted the impeachment was illegitimate and the president should be immediately acquitted because he was not accused of violating any specific law and that abuse of power is not in itself an impeachable offense. This reasoning had been previously rejected by legal scholars, and contradicts a 2018 statement by Trump's attorney general Bill Barr, who before taking office wrote a memo to Trump's Justice Department and legal team advising that abuse of power is an impeachable offense. As a Trump legal team member, prominent constitutional scholar Alan Dershowitz also argued that proof of a crime is required to impeach a president, though during the 1998 impeachment of President Clinton he asserted, "It certainly doesn't have to be a crime if you have somebody who completely corrupts the office of president and who abuses trust and who poses great danger to our liberty. You don't need a technical crime," adding, "We look at their acts of state. We look at how they conduct the foreign policy. We look at whether they try to subvert the Constitution." After the video of his statements resurfaced in light of the Trump trial, Dershowitz retracted his earlier position. On January 21, House trial managers released a 34-page response to the Trump attorneys trial memo, where they stated that the Trump attorneys trial memo was "heavy on rhetoric and procedural grievances" but did not feature a "legitimate defense" of the president. The House trial managers also argued that "any imagined defect" in the House's procedures could be addressed with the Senate admitting and receiving evidence of its own, to give Trump the fair trial he requested.

== Procedural resolution and debate ==
On January 20, McConnell presented a resolution providing procedures for the trial, subject to approval by a simple majority vote. The resolution provided the White House counsel and House impeachment managers 24 hours each over two days to make opening statements, beginning at 1:00 p.m. each day. The next day, the resolution was amended to extend opening statements to three days. Opening statements were to be followed by 16 hours of questions and answers, followed by four hours of debate and a vote on whether to consider witnesses or new information. Minority leader Schumer criticized the resolution as a "national disgrace" because it did not automatically include evidence from the House inquiry and rushed the trial, while the White House was pleased with the proposal. The next day, McConnell amended his resolution to automatically include the House inquiry evidence unless a simple majority vote prohibited it. The White House and its Senate allies were confident they could garner the simple majority needed to prevent calling witnesses, though they worked on a fallback plan if Bolton was compelled to testify by asserting national security concerns to move his testimony to a closed-door session. Some conservatives floated a proposal to permit Bolton's testimony in exchange for requiring Hunter Biden to testify, which Democrats rejected. Biden had been the subject of baseless conspiracy theories related to his business activities in Ukraine.

On January 21, Schumer and the House managers introduced 11 amendments to McConnell's resolution, which sought to subpoena testimony from current and former White House officials (Mick Mulvaney, John Bolton, Robert Blair, and Michael Duffey) and also subpoena White House, State Department, and Office of Management and Budget documents. The White House and the State Department previously refused to pass such documents to House investigators. All 11 amendments were tabled (rejected). With the exception of a single amendment to extend the amount of time permitted to file motions, which was supported by Republican senator Susan Collins, the amendments were defeated along party lines with a vote of 53 to 47.

Also on January 21, Sekulow drew a parallel between Trump withholding aid to Ukraine and President Obama withholding aid to Egypt in 2013. In the latter case, Egypt had just experienced a military coup d'etat, which under U.S. law required aid to be withheld.

On January 22, Trump gave public comments on his impeachment trial: "I thought our team did a very good job. But honestly, we have all the material. They don't have the material." The White House denied Trump was referring to documents that had been withheld from House impeachment investigators and sought by the Democratic trial managers. The following day, Sekulow told reporters, "the White House will use, and we will use, appropriate documents that will be admissible to what this record is."

During statements in the Senate chamber regarding trial procedures, Trump attorneys Cipollone and Sekulow made significant false statements which had previously been asserted by Trump supporters but debunked. Cipollone asserted that Republican House members were not allowed to participate in closed-door hearings, when in fact all Republicans who were members of the three investigating committees were entitled to attend the hearings, and many did and questioned witnesses. Cipollone also accused Adam Schiff of manufacturing a fake transcript of Trump's comments during the Trump–Zelenskyy phone call, but Schiff had said in advance that he was paraphrasing Trump's words. Cipollone also misrepresented the genesis of the president's impeachment, falsely asserting that Schiff proceeded with his investigation despite knowing his allegations were false. Sekulow asserted that Trump was denied the right to cross-examine witnesses, examine the evidence, or have an attorney present during Judiciary Committee proceedings, though the White House was invited to exercise those rights, but declined, as the president had refused to cooperate in any way with the inquiry. Sekulow also falsely asserted that the Mueller Report had concluded that Trump did not engage in obstruction of justice.

== Opening arguments ==
=== Prosecution ===
==== January 22 ====
On January 22, the first day of opening arguments, Democrats presented evidence from House impeachment inquiry testimony, the Trump–Zelenskyy phone call and Trump's statements. Schiff started by asserting that Trump needs to be removed from office because he has shown he is ready and willing to cheat in the 2020 elections. Schiff told the Senate, "The president's misconduct cannot be decided at the ballot box because we cannot be assured the vote will be fairly won." Schumer called the previous evening a "dark night for the Senate", when the White House, in response to a Freedom of Information Act lawsuit, released new evidence including a string of heavily redacted emails revealing details about how the Office of Management and Budget froze aid to Ukraine. (Note: The night after the Senate voted against subpoenaing witnesses in the trial, the Justice Department and a lawyer for the Office of Management and Budget acknowledged that some of the emails which remain undisclosed due to executive privilege contain details about why military aid to Ukraine was frozen.) Jerry Nadler and Sylvia Garcia discussed Trump's lawyer Rudy Giuliani's smear campaign against Ambassador Marie Yovanovitch. Jason Crow and Hakeem Jeffries discussed the significance of the Trump–Zelenskyy phone call, and Schiff and Zoe Lofgren detailed how the scheme was exposed to the public. Lofgren mentioned that Pentagon officials wrote to the Office of Management and Budget warning that freezing aid to Ukraine might be illegal. Schiff concluded by pointing to the courage of administration officials who risked their careers in testifying and called upon senators to show equal courage.

An estimated eleven million viewers tuned in to watch the proceedings.

During his statements, Schiff referenced a quid pro quo in Trump's actions. Outside the Senate chamber, Sekulow told reporters the articles of impeachment do not mention any quid pro quo, though Article I states that Trump had "conditioned two official acts on the public announcements that he had requested" without using the expression quid pro quo. After the session, Justice Roberts allowed a page of supplementary testimony from an aide of Vice President Mike Pence to be admitted into the record.

==== January 23 ====
On day two, House managers presented arguments to assert the evidence warranted Trump's removal from office. Jerry Nadler argued that abuse, betrayal, and corruption, or the "ABCs" of impeachment make a strong case for removal. He played videos from the impeachment trial of Bill Clinton showing statements by Senator Lindsey Graham (Republican, South Carolina) and lawyer Alan Dershowitz arguing that impeachment does not necessitate the breaking of a law; Graham absented himself during the showing of the video. They also played videos of Fiona Hill and FBI director Chris Wray to debunk the notion that Ukraine, rather than Russia, interfered in the 2016 United States presidential election. Sylvia Garcia and Adam Schiff argued several points to highlight why Trump's activities were inappropriate, including that he was not looking for an actual investigation but only an announcement of one, that the investigations were not official foreign policy and were carried out through unofficial channels, and that the White House first tried to bury the call. They pointed out that Trump himself told us he was looking for an investigation into the Bidens. They also pointed out that Vice President Biden pushed out Ukrainian prosecutor Viktor Shokin because he was not fighting corruption in Ukraine, and his ouster was backed by international organizations. (Note: In March 2016 testimony to the Senate Foreign Relations Committee, former ambassador to Ukraine John E. Herbst said, "By late fall of 2015, the EU and the United States joined the chorus of those seeking Mr. Shokin's removal" and that Joe Biden "spoke publicly about this before and during his December visit to Kyiv". During the same hearing, assistant secretary of state Victoria Nuland said, "we have pegged our next $1 billion loan guarantee, first and foremost, to having a rebooting of the reform coalition so that we know who we are working with, but secondarily, to ensuring that the prosecutor general's office gets cleaned up.") Schiff concluded by arguing that Trump cannot be counted on to stand up to the Russians if they interfere in the 2020 presidential election.

Despite strict rules of silence during the trial, Senator Graham chuckled through the presentation about Biden and he whispered to Senators John Barrasso (Republican, Wyoming) and John Cornyn (Republican, Texas). At the end of the day, Susan Collins sent a note to Chief Justice Roberts complaining about Nadler's remarks that senators would be complicit in a coverup if they did not allow testimony from additional witness. Senators Richard Burr (Republican, North Carolina), Tom Cotton (Republican, Arkansas), and Pat Toomey (Republican, Pennsylvania) played with toys while Marsha Blackburn (Republican, Tennessee) read a book during the session.

==== January 24 ====
On their third and final day, the Democrats discussed how they expected the Trump defense might respond and asked the Senate to call witnesses. Jerry Nadler called Trump a dictator and said, "The president has declared himself above the law. He has done so because he is guilty." He contrasted Trump's complete stonewalling of any witness or documents with the cooperation other presidents have offered during investigations, including Ronald Reagan during the Iran–Contra affair. Schiff rebuffed Republican arguments that House Democrats should have subpoenaed witness by pointing out that the process would probably have dragged out in the courts for months. Schiff concluded, "Give America a fair trial. She's worth it."

Some Republicans remarked that the Democrats' presentations were repetitive, though Democratic senator Tim Kaine indicated this was intentional as many senators and the public had not closely followed the impeachment inquiry. Republican senator John Kennedy acknowledged, "Senators didn't know the case. They really didn't. We didn't stay glued to the television. We haven't read the transcripts." Senator James Inhofe (Republican, Oklahoma) said, "I have to say this: Schiff is very, very effective." In his closing remarks, Schiff said of the Trump defense team, "If they couldn't get Ukraine to smear the Bidens, they want to use this trial to do it instead."

=== Defense ===
As Trump's defense team prepared to begin their statements the next day, Sekulow told reporters that during their statements Democrats had "kicked the door down" on Burisma and the Bidens, and that his team planned to respond. The Washington Post reported that the Trump team planned a scorched-earth defense by targeting the Bidens in an effort to both sway senators in the trial and undercut Trump's political opponent. Lindsey Graham stated his opposition to subpoenaing either Biden even if other witnesses were called, because he did not want the trial to interfere with the 2020 presidential election, (Note: Trump has argued that the impeachment's timing was designed to hurt Bernie Sanders's presidential campaign by forcing him to focus on the trial.) but stated his support of a separate investigation.

==== January 25 ====
The Trump defense team began its statements on January 25. The primary arguments were a lack of direct evidence of wrongdoing, and that Democrats were attempting to use the impeachment to steal the 2020 election. Sekulow cited the conspiracy theory that Ukraine had interfered in the 2016 election, suggesting this gave Trump a basis to investigate corruption in Ukraine. (Note: The United States intelligence community, the Senate Intelligence Committee and the FBI have not found evidence that Ukraine interfered in the election.) Deputy White House counsel Michael Purpura presented video from the impeachment inquiry of three envoys to Ukraine testifying that the first time they had become aware Ukraine had expressed concern about the aid being withheld was in August 2019, suggesting Ukraine was unaware of the hold at the time of the Trump–Zelenskyy phone call. (Note: Purpura omitted the testimony of Deputy Assistant Secretary of Defense Laura Cooper, who testified that her office received emails about the hold from Ukrainian officials on July 25, the day of the call.) Despite White House resistance to witness testimony during the impeachment inquiry and trial, deputy White House counsel Patrick Philbin said, "cross-examination in our legal system is regarded as the greatest legal engine ever invented for the discovery of truth."

==== January 26 ====
On January 26, The New York Times reported that Bolton had written in a draft of his forthcoming book that the president told him in August 2019 he wanted to continue freezing $391 million in aid to Ukraine until officials there pursued investigations into Democrats, including the Bidens. Trump denied Bolton's claim. The House impeachment managers subsequently called for the Senate to call Bolton as a witness. McConnell evidently had no knowledge of the book contents prior to the Times story, though White House aides have reportedly had the manuscript since late December. After the Times story was published, Trump asserted that House impeachment investigators had never called Bolton to testify. The Times later reported the Bolton book described a May 2019 Oval Office meeting during which Trump directed Bolton to call Zelenskyy to ask him to meet with Giuliani about getting damaging information on the Bidens. Bolton reportedly wrote that Giuliani, Mulvaney and Cipollone attended the meeting. Trump denied telling Bolton this, and Giuliani denied Mulvaney or Cipollone attended meetings related to Ukraine. Cipollone previously said he never attended Ukraine-related meetings, and Mulvaney said he avoided Trump–Giuliani meetings so as to not jeopardize their attorney-client privilege.

==== January 27 ====
The following day, Pam Bondi (Note: Bondi has been tied to indicted Giuliani associate Lev Parnas by Parnas and his lawyer. In the leaked audiotape of his April 2018 dinner with Trump, Parnas mentioned with regard to his illegal financial support for Florida Republican politicians like Rick Scott that he had just had lunch with Bondi, who was Florida's attorney general at the time. Photos were released of two meetings between Parnas and Bondi.) dedicated most of her time discussing the motive behind Trump's actions, citing the conspiracy theory involving the Bidens and Burisma, saying, "We would prefer not to be talking about this. But the House managers have placed this squarely at issue, so we must address it." She repeated allegations that Joe Biden had sought the removal of Ukrainian prosecutor general Viktor Shokin, who was ostensibly investigating the firm that employed Hunter Biden, though this action was in agreement with the foreign policy of the United States and other Western governments towards Ukraine at the time. (Note: Bondi did not mention that both Western governments and non-governmental organizations had sought Shokin's removal because they believed he was corrupt and that the Burisma investigation had gone dormant under him.) Bondi also falsely asserted that The New York Times reported in 2015 that Shokin was investigating Burisma and its owner.

Trump attorney Jane Raskin followed Bondi and told senators, "In this trial ... Mr. Giuliani is just a minor player, that shiny object designed to distract you." (Note: The whistleblower and several impeachment inquiry witnesses testified that Trump had instructed them to coordinate their activities through Giuliani, who was mentioned by name multiple times in the Trump–Zelenskyy phone call. Giuliani had also sent Zelenskyy a letter on behalf of Trump as a private citizen requesting a meeting with the newly elected Ukrainian president in May 2019.) Trump counsel Eric Herschmann asked why Hunter Biden was hired and paid so much by Burisma despite having no experience in the energy sector or Ukraine, then played a video of him explaining that he was employed to head the corporate governance and transparency committee on the Burisma board. Trump's team asserted that President Obama had abused his power with Russia, with Herschmann characterizing a 2012 "hot mic" incident between Obama and Russian president Dmitry Medvedev as a quid pro quo. He also played a video from a 2012 presidential debate in which Obama mocked his opponent Mitt Romney for having said Russia was America's top geopolitical opponent.

==== January 28 ====
On January 28, the final day of the Trump team's opening statements, Pat Philbin argued that no one could get into the president's mind and decide what is or is not an "illicit motive". He went on to say the president is not beholden to what his subordinates say or think. Senators James Lankford (Republican, Oklahoma) and Lindsey Graham proposed that Bolton's book should be reviewed in a classified setting; some argue that this would be illegal. Schumer immediately shot the idea down. Sekulow said the trial was "not a game of leaks and unsourced manuscripts", characterizing the reported assertion in Bolton's book as inadmissible. Schiff later remarked, "I don't think quite frankly that we could have made as effective a case for John Bolton's testimony as the president's own lawyers." Sekulow also falsely asserted that Crossfire Hurricane—the FBI investigation opened in July 2016 that investigated links between Russians and Trump campaign associates—had also investigated Trump personally; Trump did not come under personal scrutiny until his May 2017 firing of FBI director James Comey raised suspicions of obstruction of justice.

== Question-and-answer session ==
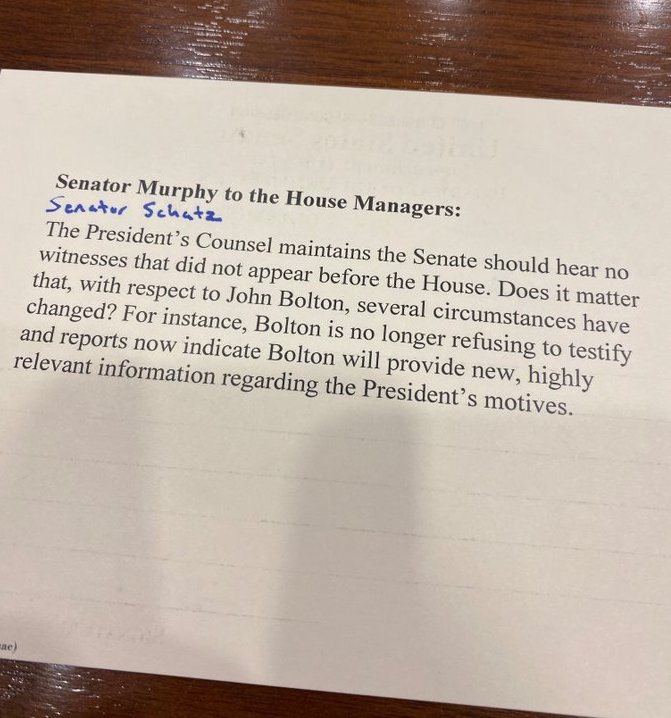
Senator Chris Murphy's question presented to the House Managers

Sixteen hours of questions and answers began on January 29. Senators had to write questions on a sheet of paper addressing the defense, the prosecution or both, which Chief Justice Roberts read out loud for the relevant team to answer. The first day contained questions of both procedural and evidentiary topics, as well as questions Roberts declined to allow, such as one speculating about the identity of the whistleblower. Senator Rand Paul was seen and heard expressing his frustration at the ruling during a break.

Most of the questions fell along party lines; Democrats questioned the House managers, and Republicans questioned Trump's lawyers. Tim Scott (Republican, South Carolina) said that was because "You don't want to see someone just drone on." The first question was from Senators Susan Collins (Republican, Maine), Mitt Romney (Republican, Utah), and Lisa Murkowski (Republican, Alaska) who asked whether Trump's conduct toward Ukraine would be impeachable if he was acting out of both public and personal motives. Patrick Philbin replied that mixed motives would make the case for impeachment fail. Asked for his view on the same question by Chuck Schumer (Democrat, New York), Schiff argued that "[I]f any part of the president's motive was a corrupt motive, that is enough to convict." Ted Cruz (Republican, Texas) asked if quid pro quo arrangements were common in foreign policy; Alan Dershowitz suggested there would be nothing wrong if the president asked a foreign country for help in his reelection because the president might think it was central to the best interests of the country. Schiff retorted that would give carte blanche to more interference in the future. Five Republicans asked how the Founding Fathers would feel about an impeachment that was supported by only one political party; Dershowitz opined that "The president is the executive branch. He is irreplaceable." Schiff and Philbin disagreed over calling witnesses. Schiff said Bolton could clear up doubts about Trump's motives, while Philbin threatened that any attempt to get Bolton to testify would tie up the proceedings for months. Schiff said Chief Justice Roberts could rule on the question.

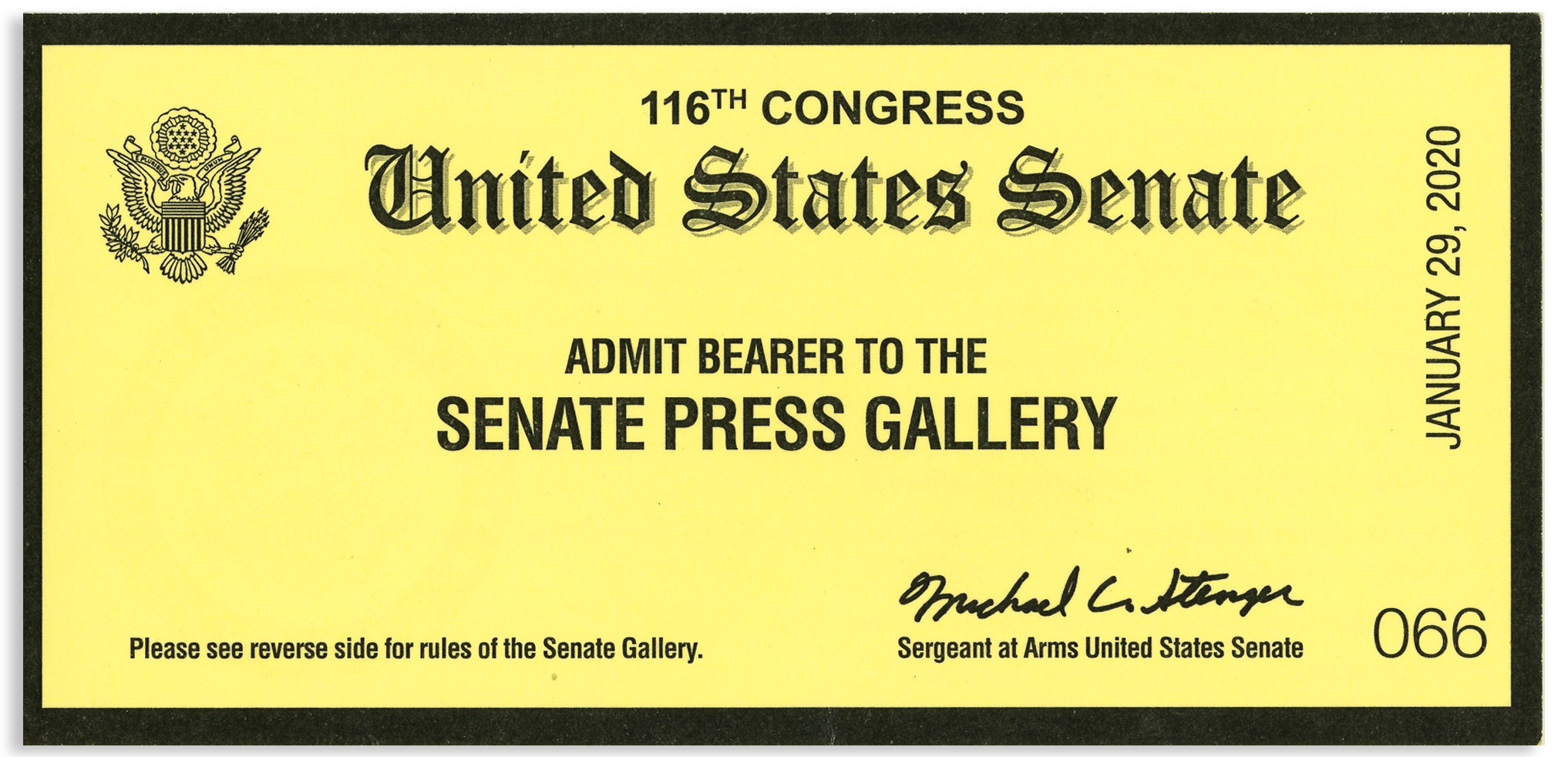
Admission ticket to the Senate Press Gallery dated January 29, 2020

Dershowitz stirred controversy on January 29 by saying, "If a president does something which he believes will help him get elected in the public interest, that cannot be the kind of quid pro quo that results in impeachment." The statement elicited concerns among many that Dershowitz was asserting a president is above the law, with Schiff telling senators it was reminiscent of former president Nixon's assertion that "when the president does it, that means it is not illegal." Dershowitz insisted his comment was mischaracterized, later stating, "a president seeking re-election cannot do anything he wants. He is not above the law. He cannot commit crimes."

The question and answer session continued on January 30. One of the first questions was how the Senate could find out when the $400 million hold was first ordered. Democratic House manager Jason Crow said that information was unknown but could be easily obtained with subpoenas for documents and witnesses, including Bolton. Senator Lisa Murkowski cited Ambassador Gordon Sondland and Senator Johnson in asking why Bolton should not be called to testify. Murkowski later joined Lamar Alexander in asking defense lawyers if withholding aid to Ukraine was impeachable; the lawyers said it is not. Senators Jack Reed (Democrat, Rhode Island), Tammy Duckworth (Democrat, Illinois), and Kamala Harris (Democrat, California) asked both sides who was paying Rudy Giuliani. Schiff reported that he did not know, and Sekulow called the question unimportant.

Senator John Thune (Republican, South Dakota) conceded that Trump did what he was charged with, but that witnesses were not necessary and the actions were not impeachable. Kevin Cramer (Republican, North Dakota) said, "I think [Bolton] sounds like a lot of the other witnesses, frankly. I don't know that he's got a lot new to add to it." Other Republicans made similar statements.

Representative Schiff inspires laughter from the Senate, after describing a Justice Department lawyer's defense argument.

Schiff pointed out that during a January 30 federal court hearing about the White House's refusal to honor congressional subpoenas, Judge Randolph Moss asked Justice Department attorney James Burnham what remedies Congress might have in such a case. Burnham suggested impeachment, though Trump's attorneys argue that obstruction of Congress is not an impeachable offense. Burnham said, "They are hypocrites. We are hypocrites, I guess," in reference to the Trump administration's stance against both impeachment and court cases, as well as the House's wanting to impeach the president for obstruction of Congress while asking the courts to enforce its subpoenas for executive-branch information. Moss said, "It seems ... remarkable to suggest that Congress as an institution can't enforce its subpoenas," noting that if that were so, subpoenas would be little more than requests.

== Vote on subpoenas ==
On January 31, after a planned debate session, the Senate voted against allowing subpoenas to call witnesses or documents with a 51–49 vote. Fifty-one Republican senators voted against calling witnesses, while 45 Democratic senators, two independents (Bernie Sanders and Angus King) who typically vote Democratic, and two Republicans (Mitt Romney and Susan Collins) voted for witnesses. Further attempts to add witnesses, Bolton in particular, via amendments were tabled with similar vote tallies but with Romney and Collins joining their fellow Republicans except for votes specifically calling for Bolton as a witness.

Senate voting results on subpoenaing new witnesses and new documents (Rollcall Vote No. 27)
	Yea	Nay	Present
Republican	2	51	0
Democratic	45	0	0
Independent	2	0	0
Totals	49	51	0
Rejected (Note: Adoption nominally based on a simple majority. There are 100 Senate seats, half is 50 and one extra vote is needed for a majority so 51 is the number of yea votes for a clear adoption. There was some uncertainty over how a 50–50 tie would be handled and whether it would give the Presiding Officer, Chief Justice John Roberts, a tie-breaking vote similar to how the Vice President of the United States votes to break a tie in the Senate. Roberts himself rejected this, saying he viewed it as "inappropriate" despite being aware of historical precedent.)

The night after the vote, the Justice Department and a lawyer for the Office of Management and Budget acknowledged, in a court filing in a FOIA lawsuit brought against the administration by the Center for Public Integrity, the existence of two dozen emails revealing Trump's thinking about the "scope, duration, and purpose" of the freeze on military aid to Ukraine. The Trump administration withheld the documents, asserting that they are subject to "presidential privilege".

== Verdict ==
Mitt Romney explaining his vote

Closing arguments were given by the prosecution and defense teams on February 3. That day, Democratic senator Joe Manchin, who was undecided on the trial vote, proposed the Senate censure the president to prevent his behavior to go "unchecked by the Senate", though there appeared to be little support for it. Senator Rand Paul (Republican, Kentucky) gave a speech reiterating the question which Chief Justice Roberts declined to read. On February 5, the Senate voted on whether to convict the president on the charges and evidence as they were presented and debated upon. The senators voted 52 to 48 to find Trump not guilty on the charge of abuse of power; all 45 Democrats, Independent senators Bernie Sanders and Angus King, and Republican senator Mitt Romney voted guilty. Romney's vote marked the first time in American history a senator voted to convict a president of his own party. On the second charge, the Senate voted 53 to 47, in a party-line vote, to find him not guilty on the charge of obstruction of Congress.

With 48% of senators voting to convict on the first article of impeachment, and 47% of senators voting to convict on the second article of impeachment, out of the four presidential impeachment trials in United States history, this trial has the lowest percentage of senators that voted to convict on at least one article. In the impeachment trial of Andrew Johnson, 64.82% of senators voted to convict on each of the three articles of impeachment which saw votes cast. In the second impeachment trial of Donald Trump, 57% of senators voted to convict on the sole article of impeachment. In the impeachment trial of Bill Clinton, 45% of senators voted to convict on the first article of impeachment, and 50% of senators voted to convict on the second article of impeachment.

Voting results
Article I (Abuse of power)			Article II (Obstruction of Congress)		
	Guilty	Not guilty		Guilty	Not guilty
Democratic	45	0	Democratic	45	0
Republican	1	52	Republican	0	53
Independent	2	0	Independent	2	0
Totals	48	52	Totals	47	53
Not guilty (Note: Guilt based on "the Concurrence of two thirds of the Members present" according to the Constitution (Article 1, Section 3, Clause 6). There are 100 Senate seats (two per U.S. state) and all Senators were present at the trial. Two-thirds of 100 is 66.6̅, so 67 guilty votes are needed for a guilty verdict.)			Not guilty		

Roll call votes on the Articles of Impeachment
Senator	Party	Article I	Article II
Lamar Alexander	R–TN	Not guilty	Not guilty
Tammy Baldwin	D–WI	Guilty	Guilty
John Barrasso	R–WY	Not guilty	Not guilty
Michael Bennet	D–CO	Guilty	Guilty
Marsha Blackburn	R–TN	Not guilty	Not guilty
Richard Blumenthal	D–CT	Guilty	Guilty
Roy Blunt	R–MO	Not guilty	Not guilty
Cory Booker	D–NJ	Guilty	Guilty
John Boozman	R–AR	Not guilty	Not guilty
Mike Braun	R-IN	Not guilty	Not guilty
Sherrod Brown	D-OH	Guilty	Guilty
Richard Burr	R–NC	Not guilty	Not guilty
Maria Cantwell	D–WA	Guilty	Guilty
Shelley Moore Capito	R–WV	Not guilty	Not guilty
Ben Cardin	D–MD	Guilty	Guilty
Tom Carper	D–DE	Guilty	Guilty
Bob Casey Jr.	D–PA	Guilty	Guilty
Bill Cassidy	R–LA	Not guilty	Not guilty
Susan Collins	R–ME	Not guilty	Not guilty
Chris Coons	D–DE	Guilty	Guilty
John Cornyn	R–TX	Not guilty	Not guilty
Catherine Cortez Masto	D–NV	Guilty	Guilty
Tom Cotton	R–AR	Not guilty	Not guilty
Kevin Cramer	R–ND	Not guilty	Not guilty
Mike Crapo	R–ID	Not guilty	Not guilty
Ted Cruz	R–TX	Not guilty	Not guilty
Steve Daines	R–MT	Not guilty	Not guilty
Tammy Duckworth	D–IL	Guilty	Guilty
Dick Durbin	D–IL	Guilty	Guilty
Mike Enzi	R–WY	Not guilty	Not guilty
Joni Ernst	R–IA	Not guilty	Not guilty
Dianne Feinstein	D–CA	Guilty	Guilty
Deb Fischer	R–NE	Not guilty	Not guilty
Cory Gardner	R–CO	Not guilty	Not guilty
Kirsten Gillibrand	D–NY	Guilty	Guilty
Lindsey Graham	R–SC	Not guilty	Not guilty
Chuck Grassley	R–IA	Not guilty	Not guilty
Kamala Harris	D–CA	Guilty	Guilty
Maggie Hassan	D–NH	Guilty	Guilty
Josh Hawley	R–MO	Not guilty	Not guilty
Martin Heinrich	D–NM	Guilty	Guilty
Mazie Hirono	D–HI	Guilty	Guilty
John Hoeven	R–ND	Not guilty	Not guilty
Cindy Hyde-Smith	R–MS	Not guilty	Not guilty
Jim Inhofe	R–OK	Not guilty	Not guilty
Ron Johnson	R–WI	Not guilty	Not guilty
Doug Jones	D–AL	Guilty	Guilty
Tim Kaine	D–VA	Guilty	Guilty
John Kennedy	R–LA	Not guilty	Not guilty
Angus King	I–ME	Guilty	Guilty
Amy Klobuchar	D–MN	Guilty	Guilty
James Lankford	R–OK	Not guilty	Not guilty
Patrick Leahy	D–VT	Guilty	Guilty
Mike Lee	R–UT	Not guilty	Not guilty
Kelly Loeffler	R–GA	Not guilty	Not guilty
Joe Manchin	D–WV	Guilty	Guilty
Ed Markey	D–MA	Guilty	Guilty
Mitch McConnell	R–KY	Not guilty	Not guilty
Martha McSally	R–AZ	Not guilty	Not guilty
Bob Menendez	D–NJ	Guilty	Guilty
Jeff Merkley	D–OR	Guilty	Guilty
Jerry Moran	R–KS	Not guilty	Not guilty
Lisa Murkowski	R–AK	Not guilty	Not guilty
Chris Murphy	D–CT	Guilty	Guilty
Patty Murray	D–WA	Guilty	Guilty
Rand Paul	R–KY	Not guilty	Not guilty
David Perdue	R–GA	Not guilty	Not guilty
Gary Peters	D–MI	Guilty	Guilty
Rob Portman	R–OH	Not guilty	Not guilty
Jack Reed	D–RI	Guilty	Guilty
Jim Risch	R–ID	Not guilty	Not guilty
Pat Roberts	R–KS	Not guilty	Not guilty
Mitt Romney	R–UT	Guilty	Not guilty
Jacky Rosen	D–NV	Guilty	Guilty
Mike Rounds	R–SD	Not guilty	Not guilty
Marco Rubio	R–FL	Not guilty	Not guilty
Bernie Sanders	I–VT	Guilty	Guilty
Ben Sasse	R–NE	Not guilty	Not guilty
Brian Schatz	D–HI	Guilty	Guilty
Chuck Schumer	D–NY	Guilty	Guilty
Rick Scott	R–FL	Not guilty	Not guilty
Tim Scott	R–SC	Not guilty	Not guilty
Jeanne Shaheen	D–NH	Guilty	Guilty
Richard Shelby	R–AL	Not guilty	Not guilty
Kyrsten Sinema	D–AZ	Guilty	Guilty
Tina Smith	D–MN	Guilty	Guilty
Debbie Stabenow	D–MI	Guilty	Guilty
Dan Sullivan	R–AK	Not guilty	Not guilty
Jon Tester	D–MT	Guilty	Guilty
John Thune	R–SD	Not guilty	Not guilty
Thom Tillis	R–NC	Not guilty	Not guilty
Pat Toomey	R–PA	Not guilty	Not guilty
Tom Udall	D–NM	Guilty	Guilty
Chris Van Hollen	D–MD	Guilty	Guilty
Mark Warner	D–VA	Guilty	Guilty
Elizabeth Warren	D–MA	Guilty	Guilty
Sheldon Whitehouse	D–RI	Guilty	Guilty
Roger Wicker	R–MS	Not guilty	Not guilty
Ron Wyden	D–OR	Guilty	Guilty
Todd Young	R–IN	Not guilty	Not guilty

== Public opinion ==
Americans were sharply divided on whether Trump should be removed from office, with Democrats largely supporting removal, Republicans largely opposing, and independents divided. A poll of 1,156 respondents conducted by Social Science Research Solutions in January 2020 found that 51% of people (89% of Democrats, 8% of Republicans, and 48% of independents) supported Trump's removal from office, compared to 45% who opposed the idea. The poll also found that 69% of respondents support calling new witnesses during the trial. Of the respondents, 32% of those sampled were Democrats, 26% were Republicans, and 42% described themselves as independents or members of another party. A January 17–22 Reuters/Ipsos poll found that about 72% of Americans believed the trial "should allow witnesses with firsthand knowledge of the impeachment charges to testify", including 69% of Republicans.

A Quinnipiac University poll released on January 28 showed that 75% of those polled support calling witnesses; 49% of Republicans, 95% of Democrats, and 75% of independents. On the issue of removing Trump from office, 48% said no and 47% said yes. 89% of the respondents said they are firm in their opinions. A Pew Research Center poll showed that 51% of Americans believed Trump should be removed from office and 70% believed he had done unethical things.

== Political reactions ==
During the trial on January 24, Senator Marsha Blackburn (Republican, Tennessee) tweeted her disdain for the Director for European Affairs for the United States National Security Council, Lieutenant Colonel Alexander Vindman, questioning his patriotism for testifying against the president. (Note: Vindman's testimony corroborates that of Fiona Hill and William B. Taylor Jr.) On January 27, former vice president Joe Biden pushed for witnesses but said he would not testify because he had nothing to defend. The following day, Senator Joni Ernst (Republican, Iowa) said she believed the trial would hurt Biden in the Iowa caucuses on February 3. A Biden spokesperson replied, "Senator Ernst just said the quiet part out loud: Republicans are terrified that Joe Biden will be the Democratic nominee, defeat Donald Trump, and help progressives gain seats in the House and take the Senate."

Steve Benen, who writes for The Rachel Maddow Show, reported on January 28 that former Trump White House chief of staff General John F. Kelly responded to Trump's downplaying of Bolton's book by saying, "If John Bolton says that in the book, I believe John Bolton." Benen notes that Kelly attributes Bolton with honesty, integrity, and character, but fails to apply the same terms to the president. Benen also quoted Senator Roy Blunt (Republican, Missouri) as rejecting witnesses, saying he did not want to "stretch this out with no change in outcome".

The White House on January 23 issued a formal threat to stop Bolton from publishing his book, The Room Where It Happened, citing national security concerns, according to CNN. Neither Bolton nor publisher Simon & Schuster responded to a request for comment.

House Speaker Pelosi said on January 30 that Trump's lawyers had trampled on the Constitution with their arguments that the president could not be impeached for using his office for political gain, and she suggested they should be disbarred. Two days after Trump's acquittal, she wrote a partisan opinion piece criticizing Republican senators as "accomplices to the president's wrongdoing" who were "normalizing lawlessness and rejecting the checks and balances of our Constitution".

Former Illinois Congressman Joe Walsh said on January 31 that the vote not to call witnesses was "Absolutely cowardly", going on to state "I'm a Republican running for president. ... these Senate Republicans ... deserve to pay a big price."

While they voted against witnesses, Senator Rob Portman (Republican, Ohio) called Trump's actions "wrong and inappropriate", and Senator Lamar Alexander (Republican, Tennessee) said they were inappropriate, but not bad enough to convict the president. Alexander said the House of Representatives proved the case that Trump withheld military aid to Ukraine to encourage its government to investigate the Bidens, but concluded that the consequences of the president's actions should be decided in the next election. Senator Susan Collins (Republican, Maine) said she believes Trump has learned his lesson from the Ukraine scandal and his impeachment, but she later said that "hopes" was a better word for it after Trump maintained that he did nothing wrong in response to Collins' comments.

With his vote to convict Trump, Republican senator Mitt Romney became the first senator to vote to convict a president of his own political party. Romney said Trump was "guilty of an appalling abuse of public trust", saying, "Corrupting an election to keep oneself in office is perhaps the most abusive and destructive violation of one's oath of office that I can imagine."

== Aftermath ==
After being apparently smeared by Rudy Giuliani and Lev Parnas, former ambassador to Ukraine Marie Yovanovitch announced her retirement from the State Department on January 31, 2020.

On February 6, the day after the trial ended, Trump gave a speech to a large group of supporters to "discuss our country's victory on the impeachment hoax". He held up a copy of The Washington Post with the headline "Trump Acquitted", saying "It's the only good headline I've ever had in The Washington Post." He said, "We've been going through this now for over three years. It was evil, it was corrupt, it was dirty cops, it was leakers and liars. And this should never, ever happen to another president, ever." He railed against perceived enemies including Mitt Romney, James Comey, and Robert Mueller, and said of Nancy Pelosi and Chuck Schumer, "In my opinion, it's almost like they want to destroy our country." The next day he told reporters that his impeachment should be "expunged" because it was a "total political hoax".

On February 7, Lt. Col. Alexander Vindman and his brother Lt. Col. Eugene Vindman were escorted from the White House and reassigned to the Defense Department and the U.S. Army's Office of General Counsel, respectively, in apparent retaliation for their testimony. At that time, Alexander Vindman was planning to leave the National Security Council in July; in July, he announced he would retire from the U.S. Army, claiming that Trump allies continued to retaliate against him by limiting his chances at promotion.

Also on February 7, ambassador to the European Union Gordon Sondland who had also testified in the House inquiry, was recalled from his post. Following the sackings, Pelosi, Schiff, and Schumer accused Trump of acting in retaliation for Vindman testifying in response to a subpoena from the House impeachment inquiry.

Days after his acquittal, Trump acknowledged that he had directed Giuliani to go to Ukraine, after denying he had prior to his impeachment.

In early February 2020, Lindsey Graham publicly said Senate Intelligence Committee chairman Richard Burr would subpoena the whistleblower to look at "whether or not the whistleblower had a bias". Later that month, Burr said, "I'm prepared to do whatever we have to to interview the whistleblower." Republican Senator John Cornyn has argued that there are "unresolved questions", including the whistleblower's "contact with [the House Permanent Select Committee on Intelligence and its staff] and ... if that was a result of a collaborative process between Mr. Schiff's staff and the whistleblower." Both Schiff and the whistleblower's lawyers have denied that Schiff played any role in creating the complaint.

On February 21, director of the Office of Presidential Personnel John McEntee held a meeting to liaise for coordination among agencies which reportedly included him asking Cabinet liaisons to identify political appointees and career officials working against the President's agenda.

On April 3, late on a Friday evening, Trump notified the Congressional intelligence committees that he intended to fire Michael Atkinson, the Inspector General of the Intelligence Community. Trump's letter did not specify a reason for firing Atkinson. However he has criticized Atkinson for helping to start his impeachment when he told Congress about the existence of a whistleblower complaint, as the law required. In defending the firing, Trump stated that Atkinson is "not a big Trump fan". Trump was heavily criticized for the firing, which many members of Congress described as another abuse of power. Adam Schiff described the firing as "yet another blatant attempt by the president to gut the independence of the intelligence community and retaliate against those who dare to expose presidential wrongdoing". Michael Horowitz, the chair of the Council of the Inspectors General on Integrity and Efficiency, also released a statement rebuking Trump and defending Atkinson's professionalism and standards. One of the only public officials who openly supported Trump's firing of Atkinson was Attorney General William Barr. Barr originally had tried and failed to prevent Atkinson from informing Congress about the existence of a whistleblower complaint. Under Barr, the Justice Department also determined that no crimes needed to be investigated with regard to the extortion of Ukraine's government. In justifying Atkinson's firing, some of Barr's statements about the actions of Atkinson and the DOJ, and the relevant laws and policies, were false.

After the 2021 storming of the United States Capitol the House of Representatives voted to approve the second impeachment of Donald Trump on January 13, 2021, leading to the second impeachment trial of Donald Trump the following month.

== Coverage ==
The trial was televised on all the major U.S. broadcast and cable television networks. Facebook and Twitter streamed the address online.

=== Viewership ===
Average of cable and network viewers

Network	Viewers
FNC	2,534,000
MSNBC	1,481,000
CBS	1,474,000
ABC	1,243,000
CNN	1,134,000
NBC	906,000

Broadcast networks

Cable news networks

== See also ==
- Second impeachment trial of Donald Trump
