= Toensing (surname) =

Toensing is a surname of Germanic origin.

Those bearing it include:

- Amy Toensing, American photojournalist
- Craig Edward Toensing (born 1937), past chair of Connecticut State Board of Education
- Richard Toensing (born 1940), American musician & educator
- Victoria Toensing (born 1941), American jurist
- Gale Courey Toensing (born 1944), American journalist with Indian Country Today
