= Amy Toensing =

American photojournalist

- Born: Amy Toensing; New Hampshire
- Education: Ohio University, College of the Atlantic
- Known for: Photojournalism
- Website: www.amytoensing.com

Amy Toensing is an American photojournalist.

== Life and work ==
Toensing obtained a bachelor's degree in human ecology from the College of the Atlantic in Maine.

She began her professional career in 1994 as a staff photographer at her home town paper, The Valley News in New Hampshire. After she started covering the Capitol Hill and the White House under the Presidency of Bill Clinton working for The New York Times. Toensing left D.C. in 1998 to receive her master's degree from the School of Visual Communication at Ohio University.

Toensing contributed to National Geographic magazine for over a decade, with 13 published feature stories. She has covered cultures around the world including the last cave dwelling tribe of Papua New Guinea, the Māori people of New Zealand and the Kingdom of Tonga, as well as the aftermath of Hurricane Katrina and Muslim women living in Western culture. Toensing spent more than four years documenting Indigenous Australians. This work was published in the June 2013 edition of National Geographic.

She is one of 11 women featured in National Geographic's ongoing traveling exhibition Women of Vision. The exhibit showcases a diversity of photos from the magazine's most accomplished women photojournalists.

In addition to her photojournalism work, Toensing teaches photography to kids and young adults in underserved communities. This includes working with nonprofit organization Vision Workshops on projects including teaching photography to Somali and Sudanese refugees in Maine and Burmese refugees in Baltimore. She traveled to Islamabad to teach young Pakistanis photojournalism and cover their own communities.

Toensing is the daughter of lawyer and GOP operative Victoria Toensing and step-daughter of her law partner Joseph DiGenova.

Toensing lives in the Hudson Valley of New York with her husband Matt Moyer, who is also a photojournalist.

== Award ==
- A photograph she took in the Australian outback was chosen as one of National Geographic's all time 50 Best Photos.

== Exhibitions ==
- 2012: Visa pour l'image, Festival of the Photograph, Perpignan, France.
- 2013–present: Women of Vision, National Geographic Photographers on Assignment.
- 2017: Visa pour l'image, Festival of the Photograph, Perpignan, France.
