= Circa News =

American online newspaper and entertainment service

- Website type: News, Lifestyle, Travel, and Culture
- Available in: English
- Dissolved: March 26, 2019; 7 years ago
- Successor: The National Desk (social media accounts)
- Owner: Sinclair Broadcast Group
- Editors: Lou Ferrara (chief content officer), Bonny Ghosh (managing editor)
- Website: circa.com
- Commercial: Yes
- Registration: Optional
- Launched: October 16, 2012; 14 years ago (initial); July 18, 2016; 10 years ago (relaunch)
- Current status: Defunct

Circa News, also known as Circa, was an American online newspaper and entertainment service. The site was founded in 2012 by Matt Galligan, Ben Huh and Arsenio Santos. The service had news stories and features consisting of individual bits of information.

The service went offline for financial reasons on June 24, 2015, and was then relaunched in spring 2016 under the ownership of the Sinclair Broadcast Group media company. Under Sinclair, the website's coverage was described by some media outlets as conservative although the site claimed to report from a neutral point of view.

The site was discontinued abruptly on March 26, 2019, with Sinclair stating that industry changes did not justify the continuation of Circa News as a website (and three days before sister property KidsClick was also closed with little notice). The former domain for the site now redirects to Sinclair's streaming portal, Stirr. Circa's social media accounts remained active but dormant, with their handles changed to the initials "TND"; Sinclair would later repurpose the accounts for its headline news service The National Desk, removing all traces of Circa from the accounts, but also retaining the existing subscribers of those feeds.

== History ==
=== Early years ===
Circa's original logo (c. 2012-2015)

On October 16, 2012, Circa launched its application for iOS. The app featured news and information from different sources and viewpoints that were stitched together into a story designed to be shifted around and changed easily as stories developed. The founders' aim for Circa was "to pursue a more pure definition of news with truths divorced from conjecture, opinion or biased analysis".

On September 24, 2014, Circa announced version 3.0 of its mobile applications. The update added a daily briefing service called "Wire", which aggregates top stories over a 24-hour period. Circa would expand from the app world to the internet in February 2015, with the announcement of a web version, CircaNews.com.

On April 30, 2015, Circa announced that it was looking for a buyer after failing to obtain a new funding round of venture capital financing. On June 21, 2015, Circa halted its news reporting operations for financial reasons. Three days later, on June 24, Circa announced that it would shut down and go on an "indefinite hiatus" following its inability to secure an buyer. CEO and co-founder Matt Galligan bade farewell to Circa in a blog post titled "Farewell to Circa News" in which, he admired the successes of Circa, but lamented the company's failure to become a sustainable business.

=== Acquisition and relaunch ===
On November 22, 2015, a few former Circa employees reported that the CircaNews.com website was again active, stating a simple message that "Circa will be back soon...". A report by the Nieman Journalism Lab said that the site's domain name was registered a month earlier to Sinclair Broadcast Group. Sinclair confirmed on 7 December 2015, that it had acquired Circa News, its intellectual property and assets earlier in 2015, and aimed to relaunch Circa in spring 2016. The acquisition of Circa was to be funded by a Sinclair subsidiary (Sinclair Digital Ventures) and potentially other investors. Circa CEO Matt Galligan mentioned at its closure the previous June that the company could sell or "white-label" its technology to a news-producing company for use in its own apps.

The revived Circa formally went live on 18 July 2016, with a redesigned app and a website using a new URL, Circa.com. From December 2016, Circa was led by the chief operating officer John Solomon, the former vice-president of content and business development for The Washington Times. Solomon was hired by Sinclair as Circa's chief creative officer in December 2015. Solomon left Circa to join The Hill in July 2017.

The app announced in March 2017, that it would be shutting down.

==== Ideology ====
Sinclair says that it aims to "let the content drive [Circa]" and not let the site adhere to any set political or cultural viewpoint, describing Vice News and Breitbart as "partisan-driven" news sites that the new Circa would not intentionally emulate. Though Sinclair has aired conservative political content on its stations, its stated intention with Circa was to present information with "no spin, just facts and transparency" and in "an irreverent tone" that will allow the site's target audience (young adults 18 to 35 years old) to form its own opinions.

Circa's reporting has been characterized by other media outlets as conservative. Circa attracted attention for its reporting on Russian interference in the 2016 election, which broke many stories seen to be favorable to the Trump administration. According to The Hill, Circa's reporting on Russian interference has "only a peripheral focus on whether anyone in Trump’s inner circle had contact with Russian officials during the campaign".

It has been reported that Sinclair had made an agreement with the Trump campaign to be given greater access in exchange for favorable coverage. Solomon said that reporting in many mainstream outlets was "reckless, false, unfair and imbalanced".

== Features ==
Since its original iteration, the Circa mobile app and website have offered "atomization" of news rather than "summarization". "Atomization", as originally expressed by Circa, means "to break down a story into its core elements: facts, stats, quotes and media", as opposed to a summary where content is reduced for quicker reading or users are linked elsewhere for the full story. Circa initially pushed multiple updates, also known as "points", over the days, weeks and months as stories continued to develop. The Circa app also allowed users to "follow" particular stories in order to receive future developments.

As relaunched in 2016, the Circa app and the Circa.com website retained the original "atomization" approach to delivering the news. The redesigned Circa emphasized "short- and long-form video, optimized for mobile and social media engagement". Circa utilizes original reporting from its own 80-person staff, user-generated content and access to video feeds and reportage from Sinclair's 172 owned-or-operated TV stations.

Circa features several portals and micro-sites accessible through its website, app and social media platforms. These include:

- Circa Now, a portal for top stories and breaking developments
- 60 Seconds, a one-minute twice-daily summary of the day's news emphasizing text prompts and images optimized for mobile viewing and social media sharing
- The Great American Pop Report, a fast-moving summary of pop culture and social media buzz
- Circa Documentaries, long- and short-form documentaries exploring serious issues and topics
- Circa Moments, daily news segments produced to air on Sinclair's owned-and-operated TV stations
- Circa 360, news, entertainment, and branded advertisements shot entirely in a virtual reality format
- Circa Humor, topical parodies, satirical content, and humorous videos produced under the supervision of David Zucker.
- It's Complicated, a series of videos discussing all aspects of dating life for millennials, including "ghosting", "cuffing" and "when to meet the parents". First shown 18 October 2017.

== See also ==
- Automatic summarization
- News aggregator
- Multi-document summarization
