= Lev Parnas =

Soviet-American businessman (born 1972)

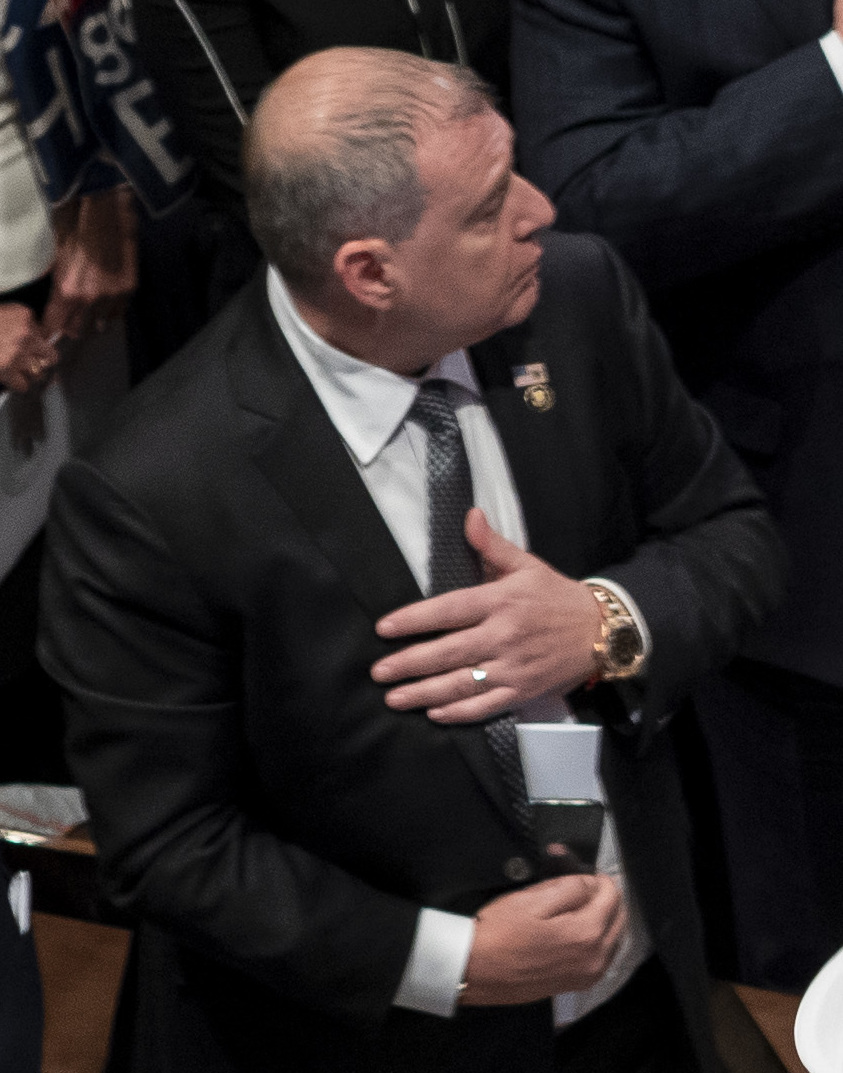
- Born: February 6, 1972 (age 54); Odesa, Ukrainian SSR, Soviet Union (now Ukraine)
- Education: Brooklyn College (attended); Baruch College (attended)
- Political party: Republican (before 2026); Democratic (2026); Independent (2026–present)
- Children: 6, including Aaron

Lev Parnas (Note: Ukrainian: Лев Парнас, romanized: Lev Parnas) (born February 6, 1972) is a Soviet-born American businessman and former associate of Rudy Giuliani. Parnas, Giuliani, Igor Fruman, John Solomon, Yuriy Lutsenko, Dmytro Firtash and his allies, Victoria Toensing and Joe diGenova, were involved in creating the false Biden–Ukraine conspiracy theory, which was part of the Trump–Ukraine scandal's efforts to damage Joe Biden. As president, Donald Trump said he did not know Parnas nor what he was involved in; Parnas insisted Trump "knew exactly what was going on".

In October 2021, Parnas was found guilty in U.S. federal court on six counts related to illegal donations to the 2020 campaign of Donald Trump. He was sentenced to 20 months in prison, three years of supervised release and $2,322,500 in restitution on June 29, 2022.

In early March 2026, Parnas announced his candidacy for the Florida 27th district seat in the 2026 election.

== Early life and education ==
Parnas was born in Odesa, the Ukrainian Soviet Socialist Republic, in 1972 to a Jewish family. His family brought him at the age of four to the U.S. via the U.S. Refugee Resettlement Program, first to Detroit, and later to Brooklyn. He was a student at Brooklyn College and Baruch College. He also worked at Kings Highway Realty, where he sold Trump Organization co-ops.

== Career ==
Parnas moved to Florida in 1995. He later founded Parnas Holdings. After a failed film project, he partnered with Igor Fruman in an energy-related venture. The Miami Herald reported that he "left a long trail of debts in Florida and beyond." It was reported that he founded company called Fraud Guarantee so he could bury the history of his debts in Google search results.

In 2019, Parnas served as a translator for a legal case involving Dmytro Firtash, a Ukrainian oligarch with close ties to the Kremlin and self-admitted Russian mob connections, who is fighting extradition to the U.S. to face bribery charges. Firtash has been free on bail in Vienna since 2014. According to prosecutors, Parnas was paid by diGenova & Toensing, LLP as an interpreter to communicate with their client, Firtash. A Swiss lawyer for Firtash loaned $1 million to Parnas's wife in September 2019, according to federal prosecutors.

=== Trump–Ukraine scandal ===
As early as April 2018, Giuliani, Parnas, and Fruman began assisting Trump's re-election efforts and they identified Ambassador Marie Yovanovitch as being an obstacle. On January 24, 2020, during the Trump impeachment trial, ABC News published a recording that Parnas's attorney claimed was made by Fruman and shared with Parnas. The recording appears to be from a small gathering with Trump, apparently during a dinner held April 30, 2018 at Trump Hotel Washington. A voice identified as Parnas's is heard to say to Trump: "The biggest problem there, I think where we need to start is we gotta get rid of the Ambassador."

Late in 2018, Giuliani dispatched the two to Ukraine to search for damaging information on Trump's U.S. political rivals. According to The New York Times, "Their mission was to find people and information that could be used to undermine the Special Counsel's investigation, and also to damage former Vice President Joseph R. Biden." Both were at the center of the pro-Trump forces' push to remove Ambassador Yovanovitch, because her loyalty to Trump was deemed insufficient. It was reported the two also pressed for support for allegations that former Ukrainian officials schemed to manipulate the 2016 election to support Hillary Clinton, by revealing adverse information about Paul Manafort, chairman of Trump's campaign, which became a central element in Mueller's special counsel investigation.

Over the course of a year beginning in 2018, Parnas and Fruman assisted Giuliani and his associates to contact Ukrainians who were working on finding alleged corruption surrounding Hunter Biden and Burisma. These included Yuriy Lutsenko, then the Prosecutor General of Ukraine, who was crucial to Giuliani's efforts to produce damaging information. Viktor Shokin, a former Prosecutor General of Ukraine, was part of this group.

In late September 2019, the whistleblower report was released, which characterized Parnas and Fruman as "two associates of Mr. Giuliani."

On September 30, 2019, Adam Schiff of the Democrat House Intelligence Committee requested documents from Parnas. Parnas was initially represented by John M. Dowd, who was Trump's personal attorney during part of the Mueller investigation in 2017–18. Trump consented to this representation, as evidenced in an email from White House Counsel Jay Sekulow to the president. Parnas later disclosed that they met with Dowd in Dowd's home and conducted a conference call with Sekulow and Giuliani. According to revelations disclosed on The Rachel Maddow Show by Parnas in 2020, they decided to claim immunity and not cooperate on the basis that Giuliani was the president's attorney, protected by attorney-client privilege, and they were working under the direction of Giuliani. On October 7, 2019, Dowd informed the Miami Herald newspaper there would be no cooperation, Mike Pompeo made a similar announcement, and State Department employee Charles Kent failed to appear before the House Intelligence Committee. On October 8, 2019, White House counsel Pat Cipollone issued a document that confirmed that Trump and his administration would not cooperate with the impeachment inquiry in any manner.

==== Arrest and prosecution ====
Parnas and Fruman were arrested on the evening of October 9, 2019, at Dulles International Airport, and charged with planning to direct funds from a foreign government "to U.S. politicians while trying to influence U.S.-Ukraine relations". They had one-way tickets to Frankfurt, Germany, and were reported to be going to Vienna, Austria. The head of the New York FBI office described the investigation as "about corrupt behavior, deliberate lawbreaking".

The charges alleged Parnas and Fruman were involved in the campaign to oust Ambassador Yovanovitch from her post and have her recalled. In 2018, the operation included Parnas and Fruman donating funds and pledging further additional moneys to an unnamed Congressman, who was allegedly recruited for the campaign to oust her. The funds were allegedly funneled through a shell company, Global Energy Producers, and some violated campaign limits. Parnas and Fruman were also charged with unlawful campaign contributions. Based on campaign finance filings, former congressman Pete Sessions (R-Texas) was identified as the unnamed recipient. In 2018, as the Chairman of the House Rules Committee, Sessions wrote a letter to Secretary of State Mike Pompeo saying that Ambassador Yovanovitch should be fired for privately expressing "disdain" for the Trump administration.

The House Intelligence Committee converted their request for documents from Parnas and Fruman into subpoenas on October 10, 2019. The New York field office of the Federal Bureau of Investigation (FBI), along with SDNY prosecutors, were conducting a criminal investigation of Giuliani's relationship with Parnas and Fruman. Giuliani was at the time under investigation for potentially violating lobbying laws, but that investigation ended without charges.

Parnas dismissed Dowd and retained Joseph Bondy, who announced on November 5, 2019, that Parnas "is now prepared to comply with requests for records and testimony from congressional impeachment investigators".

On November 22, 2019, Parnas stated to CNN that he would be willing to testify to Congress regarding his, Republican congressman Devin Nunes's, Giuliani's, and Trump's role in the Ukraine affairs. Documents released to a watchdog group showed communication took place between Giuliani and Pompeo shortly before Ambassador Yovanovitch was removed from her post. Memos from Giuliani to Pompeo regarding a January 23, 2019, meeting with Ukraine's former prosecutor general Victor Shokin were included. Giuliani noted that Igor Fruman and Lev Parnas were present at the meeting. Shokin was ousted from his job in 2016 because of his lack of attention to corruption cases.

On January 20, 2020, Bondy filed a motion seeking the appointment of a special prosecutor outside the Justice Department and for U.S. Attorney General William Barr to recuse himself. The U.S. Attorney for the Southern District of New York Geoffrey Berman recused himself in the Michael Cohen case owing to his political support of Trump. Trump reportedly asked then acting U.S. Attorney General Matthew Whitaker to override Berman's recusal and to prosecute Cohen. To date, Berman has not recused himself in the Parnas case despite similar potential conflicts of interest as in the Cohen case. Additionally, Berman worked at the same law firm as Giuliani.

In a May 2021 letter to federal judge J. Paul Oetken, Bondy wrote he had seen a government chart detailing the extent to which SDNY investigators had acquired communications of parties related to the Parnas case, and asserted:

The evidence seized likely includes e-mail, text, and encrypted communications that are either non-privileged or subject to an exception to any potentially applicable privilege, between, inter alia, Rudolph Giuliani, Victoria Toensing, the former President, former Attorney General William P. Barr, high-level members of the Justice Department, Presidential impeachment attorneys Jay Sekulow, Jane Raskin and others, Senator Lindsey Graham, Congressman Devin Nunes and others, relating to the timing of the arrest and indictment of the defendants as to prevent potential disclosures to Congress in the first impeachment inquiry of then-President Donald. J. Trump.

Parnas asked for the charges to be dismissed, claiming that the Trump administration had prosecuted him to protect Trump against Congressional investigations, but a federal judge rejected this claim as a "conspiracy theory." Parnas was subsequently convicted in March 2022 and sentenced to 20 months in prison. Parnas was released to home confinement in late 2022, and completed his sentence in September 2023.

==== MSNBC interview ====
In early January 2020, an attorney for Parnas turned over photos, text messages and thousands of pages of documents to the House Permanent Subcommittee on Investigations.

On January 15 and 16, 2020 MSNBC aired segments of an interview of Parnas conducted by Rachel Maddow. This was Parnas's first television interview regarding his involvement in the Trump-Ukraine scandal. Some of Parnas's claims were supported by documentary evidence released by the House that same week. Elements of the interview including timelines that were cross-checked by some news organizations against event records such as the date Pence announced he would not be going to Ukraine. White House press secretary Stephanie Grisham, Pence spokesman Marc Short, and a Justice Department spokesman stressed the fact that Parnas was under indictment and therefore was not credible. Trump repeated the claims he did not know Parnas, and denied he was aware of a letter by Giuliani to the Ukrainian president wherein Giuliani claimed that he was acting on the behalf of Trump.

Parnas made many claims in the interview:

- "Trump knew exactly what was going on" and Parnas's efforts were coordinated with Trump's attorney, Rudy Giuliani. He also said that "Attorney General Barr was basically on the team" and conferred with Giuliani frequently.
- Trump's counsel Jay Sekulow was also aware, however he "wanted to stay away from all this stuff involving Ukraine".
- Parnas met in Ukraine with a top Ukrainian official and informed him he was speaking on Trump's behalf; Parnas warned that all aid to Ukraine, as well as Pence's attendance at the inauguration of the new Ukrainian President, were contingent upon an announcement that Biden was being investigated.
- Pence was "in the loop" and knew the reason his trip to Ukraine was cancelled after the Ukrainian government failed to comply with Trump's demand as communicated by Parnas.
- The motivation to get rid of Ambassador Yovanovitch was to obtain negative information about Joe Biden. Specifically, former Prosecutor General of Ukraine Yuriy Lutsenko claimed he would deliver evidence of improper behavior about "B" after a decision was made about "Madam". This particular claim was backed by a March 22, 2019, text from Lutsenko that was released by the House and discussed in the interview. Trump removed Yovanovitch from her post in May 2019.
- Parnas described a dinner with President Trump where the Ambassador was discussed and Trump said to fire her. This claim was substantiated further by an audio recording of this meeting released on January 24, 2020.
- Ukrainian businessman Firtash claimed he could help discredit the Mueller investigation if charges against him were dropped.
- Parnas claimed he met Congressman Devin Nunes "several times at the Trump Hotel", but that most of his interactions were with Nunes's aide Derek Harvey. Parnas's claim that "they were involved in getting all this stuff on Biden" was substantiated by records released by the House after the interview.
- Former Energy Secretary Rick Perry, who did attend the Ukrainian President's inauguration, informed the Ukrainians that there would be no aid unless an announcement was made to investigate Biden.
- Parnas was initially pleased to have Trump's former adviser Dowd represent him and believed that it demonstrated he had the President's support. However, it became clear Parnas's interests were not in mind when Dowd visited Parnas in prison. Parnas claimed Dowd "basically start talking to me like a drill sergeant and telling me, giving me orders, like, you know, be a good boy, like, you know."

One of the significant documents discussed during the interview was Giuliani's letter to President-elect Zelenskyy that was released by the House Intelligence Committee. The letter was seen as evidence that President Trump knew of his attorney's activities on his behalf. Giuliani wrote that he represented the private interests of President Trump with his "knowledge and consent". The letter was presented to the U.S. Senate during the impeachment trial of President Trump.

When asked by Rachel Maddow, Parnas claimed that his decision to speak out was made to protect this country from President Trump and his allies, stating that they are all part of one large "cult."

==== Text messages with Robert Hyde ====
Included within the documents released by the House in January 2020 were text messages between Parnas and Robert F. Hyde, a Republican candidate for Congress in Connecticut. The messages indicated that Ambassador Yovanovitch was under surveillance and implied she was in possible danger. During the interview with Maddow, Parnas largely discounted this possibility and said Hyde drank a lot. However, during her testimony, the Ambassador stated that she was advised to leave Ukraine on "the next plane" in April 2019 because her security was at risk. Maddow played clips of this testimony during the airing of the interview. The FBI finally visited Hyde to make inquiries on January 16, 2020—the day after the first segment of the interview aired—even though they reportedly had the messages in hand since Parnas's arrest in October 2019. Ukrainian authorities announced they were conducting an investigation that same day. Hyde claimed he was getting the information he was giving to Parnas from a Belgian citizen named Anthony de Caluwe he had met at GOP functions. Initially, de Caluwe denied any involvement and then later claimed it was all a "joke" after evidence was released by the House that supported Hyde's assertions.

An official from the Department of Justice attributed the delay between when they received the messages and finally acted to (???) Parnas and claimed they were unable to read the messages contained within Parnas's iPhone until recently. Parnas's attorney in turn wrote that the Department of Justice sat on documents since December 3, 2019 when the messages from the iPhone were first extracted. Secretary of State Mike Pompeo issued a statement a full two days after the texts were revealed and stated "to the best of (his) recollection" never heard any of this. He announced he would look into it but also stated he didn't think anything would come of the investigation.

==== January 16, 2020 CNN interview ====
Parnas was also interviewed by Anderson Cooper of CNN on January 16, 2020. The primary different claims made by Parnas during this interview were as follows:

- The first effort to effect a quid pro quo was with former Ukrainian President Petro Poroshenko. Poroshenko was asked to support Trump's efforts in exchange for a meeting with the U.S. president in the White House, and other official support of Ukraine.
- In his interview with Maddow, Parnas already said Ukraine would face losing support and that Vice President Pence would not attend the inauguration of the newly elected Ukrainian President Volodymyr Zelenskyy unless he announced an investigation into the Biden. In the CNN interview, Parnas added that the announcement needed to be made within 24 hours or that there would be no chance of any White House visits while Trump was in office.
- Parnas said there was no other reason than winning the 2020 election and another four years.
- When Cooper asked Parnas if Pence knew what Giuliani and his associates were planning, Parnas acknowledged that he was unsure whether or not Pence knew “everything we were doing.”.
- In a meeting with Ukrainian officials, Parnas's said that his voice and authority was that of POTUS.
- Parnas said, “I thought they were going to shut me up and make me look like the scapegoat".
- Parnas said he spoke to Giuliani every day, first thing in the morning.

==== Giuliani's rebuttal ====
On January 20, 2020, Giuliani appeared on Fox News' The Ingraham Angle and claimed he was "heartbroken" by the "stupid lies" told by Parnas the previous week. Giuliani said he was very close with Parnas, even godfather to his child, and very disappointed. He said Parnas was just trying to avoid jail and was telling lies like Michael Cohen. He also said he would not get into a point by point rebuttal of all the claims Parnas made, but would testify to all the facts if he was called as a witness. He welcomed an opportunity to testify where he would inform everyone about "unbelievable amount of corruption that went on between the Democratic Party and Ukraine". Giuliani stressed two areas in which he stated that Parnas had lied.

- During a White House party, Trump did not "deputize" Parnas as a "representative".
- In 2018, Devin Nunes did not travel to Vienna to meet with former Ukrainian prosecutor Viktor Shokin and his passport proves that.

Giuliani stressed that owing to these two lies, that nothing in the two Parnas interviews should be believed. Giuliani also insisted that Parnas was wrong when he implicated William Barr. He further stated he never spoke to Barr about it and that it was wrong to accuse Barr of being part of it. When asked if he directed the surveillance of the Ambassador to Ukraine, Giuliani replied, "I can definitely tell you I didn't."

=== Campaign funding ===
Some of the money to potentially fund efforts by Giuliani, Parnas, and Fruman appears to have come from a Republican donor and Trump supporter Charles Gucciardo. Gucciardo's attorney claimed his client's $500,000 was an investment made in 2018 with Parnas's firm Fraud Guarantee. These funds in turn were claimed to be a retainer fee from Fraud Guarantee to Giuliani. According to Giuliani, he was "ramping up" the business.

Harry Sargeant III, a billionaire Republican donor, helped bankroll the travels of Parnas and Fruman, thereby supporting their overall efforts to pressure Ukraine to help with Trump's re-election effort. An attorney representing Sargeant said the funds were loans. Dmytro Firtash's Swiss attorney also described a $1 million payment made to Parnas's wife as being a "loan".

Reporters in a Bloomberg News article wrote that it was unlikely President Trump paid for Giuliani's, Parnas's, and Fruman's expensive travels and stays at expensive hotels. Therefore, monies and loans to fund their work in Ukraine on his behalf to win a Federal election appear to be reportable campaign contributions. Further any foreign contributions would have been illegal. Bloomberg News is named for, and partly owned by, Michael Bloomberg who was seeking the Democratic nomination to run against President Trump.

=== Possible Trump meeting ===
On January 24, 2020, ABC News released an audio recording that appeared to be a conversation between Parnas and President Trump. The recording may have been made at a dinner gathering held on April 30, 2018, at the Trump International Hotel. On the recording, President Trump can be heard ordering someone, who may have been Johnny DeStefano, to fire Ambassador Yovanovitch. Trump's order came after Parnas said something to the effect that it was important to get rid of her first. Parnas's attorney appeared on the Rachel Maddow show that same evening and stated the tape was made by Fruman and given to Parnas. Parnas in turn uploaded it to his document cloud. Parnas's attorney stated that Parnas didn't provide the tape to ABC News. Apparently, the ABC News article prompted Parnas to search his document cloud where he located the full tape that is over an hour long. Parnas's attorney stated the whole tape had been given to the House Intelligence Committee.

The tape was made public on January 25. Trump is heard discussing golf with Jack Nicklaus III (grandson of golfer Jack Nicklaus), and trade deals and steel quotas with Barry Zekelman of Zekelman Industries.

== Congressional testimony ==
At the invitation of committee Democrats, on March 20, 2024, Parnas testified before the Republican-controlled House Oversight Committee investigation into the Biden family that was pursuing the impeachment of President Joe Biden. Parnas testified, in part:

The American people have been lied to, by Donald Trump, Rudy Giuliani and various cohorts of individuals in government and media positions. They created falsehoods to serve their own interests knowing it would undermine the strength of our nation ... Congressman Pete Sessions, then-Congressman Devin Nunes, Senator Ron Johnson and many others understood they were pushing a false narrative. The same goes for John Solomon, Sean Hannity and media personnel, particularly with Fox News, who used this narrative to manipulate the public ahead of the 2020 elections. Sadly, they are still doing this today as we approach the 2024 elections ... The only information ever pushed on the Bidens and Ukraine has come from one source and one source only: Russia and Russian agents.

== Personal life ==
Lev Parnas lives with his wife and five of his six children in Boca Raton, Florida. He is the father of political influencer Aaron Parnas.

=== Philanthropy ===
Parnas has contributed to Ukrainian-Jewish charities and causes. He is on the board of the Ukrainian-Jewish charity Friends of Anatevka, founded by Ukrainian rabbi Moshe Reuven Azman, to provide a refuge for Ukrainian Jews affected by the Russian military intervention in Ukraine. Parnas and Fruman visited Israel in the summer of 2018 as a part of a delegation, led by former Arkansas governor Mike Huckabee and joined by Anthony Scaramucci. The group met with U.S. Ambassador to Israel, David M. Friedman and Benjamin Netanyahu's son Yair Netanyahu. While in Israel, Parnas and Fruman also met with Ihor Kolomoyskyi, a wealthy Ukrainian oligarch and long-time mentor and patron of President of Ukraine, Volodymyr Zelenskyy.

== Bibliography ==
- Parnas, Lev, and Jerry Langton (2024). Shadow Diplomacy: Lev Parnas' Wild Ride from Brooklyn to Donald Trump's Inner Circle. ISBN 979-8-8795-2030-9

== See also ==
- Corruption in the United States
- Foreign interference in the 2020 United States elections
- List of federal political scandals in the United States
