= John Solomon (political commentator) =

American media executive and political commentator

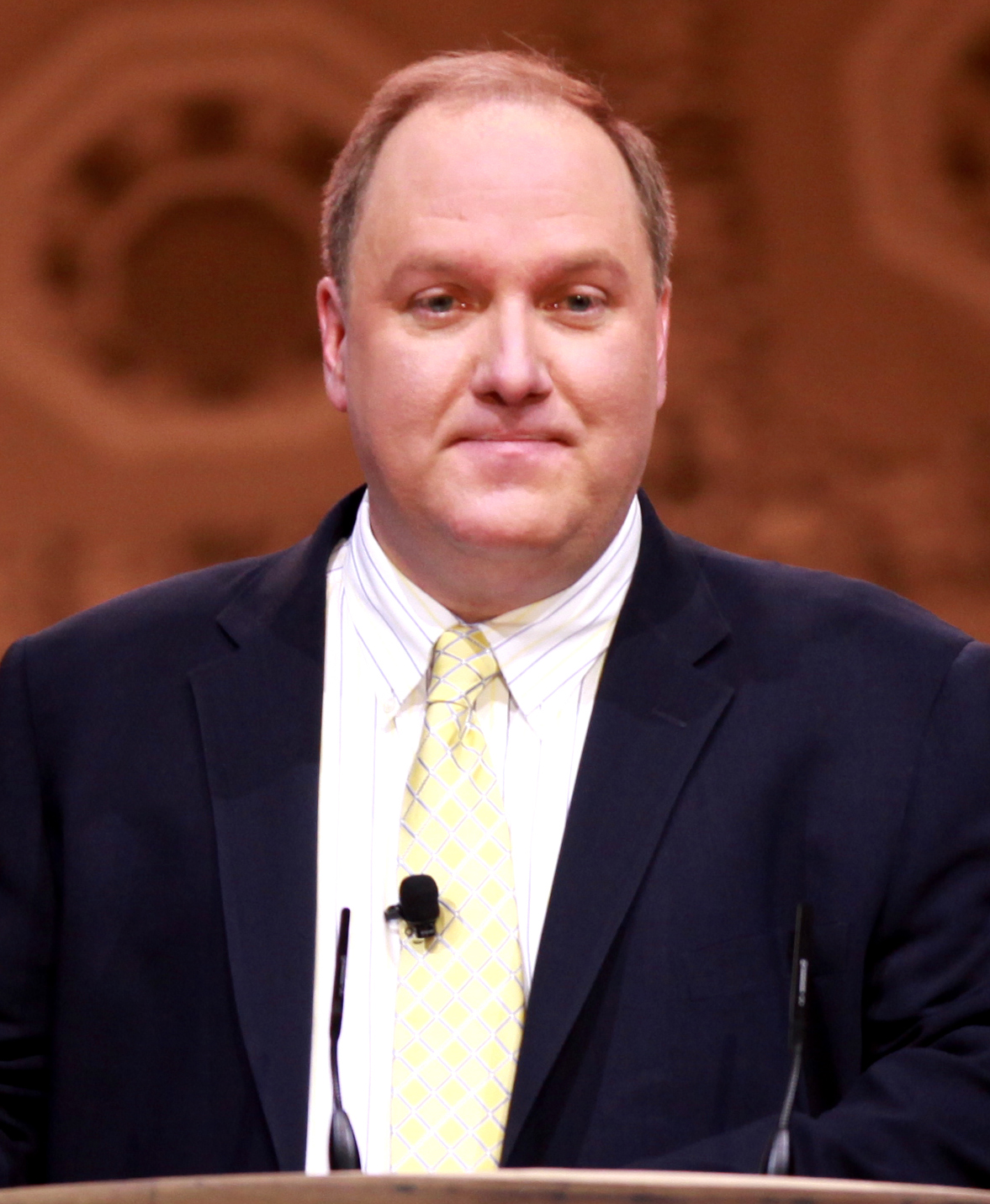
- Solomon in 2014
- Born: January 5, 1967 (age 59)
- Education: Marquette University (BA)
- Occupations: Investigative journalist; author; political commentator
- Years active: 1987–present
- Employers: Associated Press (1987–2006); The Washington Post (2007); The Washington Times (2008–2009; 2013–2015); Packard Media Group (2009–2015); Center for Public Integrity (2010–2011); Newsweek / The Daily Beast (2011); Washington Guardian (2012–2013); Circa News (2015–2017); The Hill (2017–2019); Fox News (2019–2020); Just the News (2020–present)
- Organizations: Just the News (founder, CEO, editor-in-chief)

John F. Solomon is an American investigative journalist, author, and political commentator. He is the founder, editor-in-chief, and CEO of Just the News, a digital news organization launched in 2020. Over a career spanning more than three decades, he has held reporting and editorial positions at Associated Press, The Washington Times, The Hill, and was a contributor at Fox News until late 2020.

Solomon has received several awards, including the 2008 Robert F. Kennedy Journalism Award for his investigative journalism. However, he has also been accused of exaggerating minor scandals, creating false controversy, and promoting conspiracy theories. During the first Trump presidency, Solomon was accused of advancing Trump-friendly stories including ones that questioned reports about women who accused Trump of sexual harassment and who had also sought payments from partisan political donors. He also questioned the legitimacy of the criminal charges against Trump's campaign manager, Paul Manafort.

Solomon has been described by some as playing an important role in promoting conspiracy theories about unproven allegations of wrongdoing in Ukraine by Joe Biden and his son, Hunter. Solomon's reporting on the Bidens influenced Trump's unsuccessful efforts to pressure Ukrainian President Volodymyr Zelenskyy into publicly launching an investigation into the elder Biden—an effort that ultimately led to Trump's first impeachment.

== Early years and education ==
Solomon graduated from Marquette University with a bachelor's degree in journalism and sociology.

From 1987 until 2006, Solomon worked at the Associated Press, where he became the assistant bureau chief in Washington, helping to develop some of the organization's first digital products, such as its online elections offering.

In 2007, he served as The Washington Post's national investigative correspondent.

== The Washington Times (2008–‍2009; 2013–‍2015) ==
=== Executive Editor ===
In February 2008, Solomon became editor-in-chief of The Washington Times. Under Solomon, the Times changed some of its style guide to conform to more mainstream media usage. The Times announced that it would no longer use words like "illegal aliens" and "homosexual," and instead opt for "more neutral terminology" such as "illegal immigrants" and "gay," respectively. The paper also decided to stop using "Hillary" when referring to Senator Hillary Clinton, and to stop putting the word "marriage" in the expression "gay marriage" in quotes. He also oversaw the redesign of the paper's website and the launch of the paper's national weekly edition. A new television studio was built in the paper's Washington DC headquarters, and the paper also launched a syndicated three-hour morning drive radio news program.

Solomon left the paper in November 2009 after internal shakeups and financial uncertainty among the paper's ownership.

=== Return ===
After a three-and-a-half-year hiatus, most of which was spent at Circa News, Solomon returned to the Washington Times in July 2013 to oversee the newspaper's content, digital, and business strategies. He helped craft digital strategies for the purpose of expanding online traffic, created new products and partnerships, and led a reorganization of the company's advertising and sales team. He also helped launch a new subscription-only national edition targeted for tablets, cellphones, and other mobile devices, and helped push a redesign of the paper's website.

Solomon left the paper in December 2015 to serve as chief creative officer of the mobile news application Circa, which was relaunching at that time.

== Between The Times and The Hill (2015–‍2017) ==
=== Packard Media Group ===
Solomon was president of Packard Media Group from November 2009 to December 2015. Solomon also served as journalist in residence at the Center for Public Integrity, a non-profit organization that specializes in investigative journalism, from March 2010 to June 2011. He was also named executive editor of the Center for Public Integrity in November 2010 and helped oversee the launch of iWatch News, but resigned a few months later to join Newsweek/The Daily Beast in May 2011.

=== Washington Guardian ===
In 2012, Solomon and former Associated Press executives Jim Williams and Brad Kalbfeld created the Washington Guardian, an online investigative news portal. It was acquired by The Washington Times when Solomon returned to the paper in July 2013.

=== Circa ===
After leaving The Washington Times, Solomon became chief creative officer for Circa News. Circa is a mobile news application founded in 2011 that streams updates on big news events to users. In June 2015 it shut down, but its relaunch was announced after its acquisition by Sinclair Broadcast Group.

As chief of Circa, he wrote and published a number of political articles, often defending the first Trump administration. He left in July 2017.

== The Hill (2017–‍2019) ==
Upon leaving Circa, Solomon became executive vice president of digital video and an opinion columnist for The Hill. Until May 2018, he worked on news and investigative pieces for The Hill. According to The New York Times, Solomon tended to push narratives about alleged misdeeds by Trump's political enemies.

In October 2017, Solomon published an article in The Hill about the Uranium One controversy, where he insinuated that Russia had made payments to the Clinton Foundation at the time when the Obama administration approved the sale of Uranium One to Rosatom. Solomon's story also focused on the alleged failures of the Department of Justice to investigate and report on the controversy, suggesting a cover-up. Clinton was only one of the nine members constituting the Committee on Foreign Investments which approved the deal. Other members of the committee include the secretaries of the treasury, defense, homeland security, commerce and energy; the attorney general; and representatives from two White House offices (the United States Trade Representative and the Office of Science and Technology Policy). Solomon pinned responsibility for the decision solely on Secretary Clinton. Subsequent to Solomon's reporting, the story "took off like wildfire in the right-wing media ecosystem," according to a 2018 study by scholars at the Berkman Klein Center for Internet & Society, Harvard University. No evidence of any quid pro quo or other wrongdoing has surfaced.

In January 2018, newsroom staffers at The Hill criticized Solomon's reporting as having a conservative bias and missing important context, and asserted that this undermined The Hill's reputation. They also expressed concerns over Solomon's close relationship with conservative Fox News personality Sean Hannity, whose TV show Hannity he appeared on more than a dozen times over a span of three months. In May 2018, the editor-in-chief of The Hill announced that Solomon would become an "opinion contributor" at The Hill while remaining executive vice president of digital video. He frequently appeared on Fox News, which continued to describe him as an investigative reporter, even after he became an opinion contributor.

=== Pro-Donald Trump opinion pieces ===
Solomon published a story alleging that women who had accused Trump of sexual assault had sought payments from partisan donors and tabloids.

On June 19, 2019, The Hill published an opinion piece written by Solomon alleging that the FBI and Robert Mueller had disregarded warnings that evidence used against Trump's former campaign manager Paul Manafort may have been faked. His source was Nazar Kholodnytsky, a disgraced Ukrainian prosecutor, and Konstantin Kilimnik, who has been linked to Russian intelligence and was Manafort's business partner.

=== Trump–Ukraine scandal ===
In April 2019, The Hill published two opinion pieces by Solomon regarding allegations by Ukrainian officials that "American Democrats", and particularly former Vice President Joe Biden, were collaborating with "their allies in Kiev" in "wrongdoing...ranging from 2016 election interference to obstructing criminal probes." Solomon's stories attracted attention in conservative media. Fox News frequently covered Solomon's claims; Solomon also promoted these allegations on Sean Hannity's Fox News show. According to The Washington Post Solomon's pieces "played an important role in advancing a flawed, Trump-friendly tale of corruption in Ukraine, particularly involving Biden and his son Hunter", and inspired "the alleged effort by Trump and his allies to pressure Ukraine's government into digging up dirt on Trump's Democratic rivals." On the same day that The Washington Post published its article, The Hill published another opinion piece by Solomon in which Solomon states that there are "(h)undreds of pages of never-released memos and documents...(that) conflict with Biden's narrative."

Solomon's stories had significant flaws. Not only had the State Department dismissed the allegations presented by Solomon as "an outright fabrication", but the Ukrainian prosecutor who Solomon claimed made the allegations to him is not supporting Solomon's claim. Foreign Policy noted that anti-corruption activists in Ukraine had characterized the source behind Solomon's claims as an unreliable narrator who had hindered anti-corruption efforts in Ukraine. Solomon pushed allegations that Biden wanted to remove a Ukrainian prosecutor in order to prevent an investigation of Burisma, a Ukrainian company that his son, Hunter Biden, served on; however, Western governments and anti-corruption activist wanted the prosecutor removed because he was reluctant to pursue corruption investigations. By September 2019, Solomon said he still stood 100% by his stories. FactCheck.org reported in 2019 that there was no evidence of wrongdoing by Joe Biden and Hunter Biden, nor evidence that Hunter Biden was ever under investigation by Ukrainian authorities. WNYC characterized Solomon's Ukraine stories as laundering of foreign propaganda.

Prior to the publication of a story where Solomon alleged that the Obama administration had pressured the Ukrainian government to stop investigating a group funded by George Soros, Solomon sent the full text of his report to Ukrainian-American businessman Lev Parnas, and to pro-Trump lawyers and conspiracy theorists Joseph diGenova and Victoria Toensing as well. Solomon said he did so for fact-checking, but Parnas, DiGenova and Toensing were not mentioned in the text, nor did Solomon send individual items of the draft for vetting, but rather the draft of the entire article.

During October 2019 hearings for the impeachment inquiry against Donald Trump, two government officials experienced in Ukraine matters — Alexander Vindman and George Kent — testified that Ukraine-related articles Solomon had written and that were featured in conservative media circles contained a "false narrative" and in some cases were "entirely made up in full cloth."

Solomon worked closely with Lev Parnas, an associate of Rudy Giuliani - Trump's personal attorney – who was indicted for funneling foreign money into American political campaigns, to promote stories that Democrats colluded with a foreign power in the 2016 election. (The U.S. intelligence community's assessment is that Russia interfered in the 2016 election to aid Trump, then a Republican presidential candidate). Parnas worked with Solomon on interviews and translation. Solomon defended his work with Parnas: "No one knew there was anything wrong with Lev Parnas at the time. Everybody who approaches me has an angle." According to ProPublica, Parnas helped set Solomon up with the Ukrainian prosecutor who accused the Bidens of wrong-doing (before walking back the claim).

Parnas testified that "Every person integral to this shadow diplomacy knew that the Biden corruption rumors were baseless."

Then-Congressman Devin Nunes, Senator Ron Johnson, and many other individuals understood that they were pushing a false narrative. The same goes for John Solomon, Sean Hannity, and media personnel, particularly at Fox News, who used that narrative to manipulate the public ahead of the 2020 election. They are still doing this today, as we approach the 2024 election.

=== Impeachment inquiry against Donald Trump ===
Solomon was mentioned in a draft report by the House Intelligence Committee published December 3, 2019, documenting President Trump's alleged abuse of office for his personal and political gain by using congressionally approved military aid to induce Ukraine initiate investigations against Trump's domestic political rival. The report documented phone records showing Solomon was in frequent contact with Lev Parnas, an associate of Giuliani, exchanging "at least 10 calls" during the first week in April. Parnas was later convicted of various financial crimes, which included making illegal donations to politicians.

=== Advertising controversy ===
Solomon was accused of breaking the traditional ethical "wall" that separated news stories from advertising at The Hill. In October 2017, Solomon negotiated a $160,000 deal with a conservative group called Job Creators Network to target ads in The Hill to business owners in Maine. He then had a quote from the group's director inserted into a news story about a Maine senator's key role in an upcoming vote on the Trump administration's tax bill. Solomon “pops by the advertising bullpen almost daily to discuss big deals he's about to close," Johanna Derlega, then The Hill’s publisher, wrote in an internal memo at the time, according to Pro Publica. "If a media reporter gets ahold of this story, it could destroy us."

=== Departure ===
In September 2019, the Washington Examiner reported that Solomon would leave The Hill at the end of the month to start his own media firm. A February 2020 internal review by The Hill concluded that there were multiple flaws in Solomon's 14 columns about Ukraine and the Bidens, including omitting important details and failing to disclose that the sources used by Solomon were his own attorneys Victoria Toensing and Joseph diGenova—both close associates of Trump and his personal attorney Rudy Giuliani.

== Fox News (2019–‍2020) ==
In October 2019, it was reported that Solomon was joining Fox News as an opinion contributor. An internal Fox News research briefing book warned that "John Solomon played an indispensable role in the collection and domestic publication" of parts of the Trump-Ukraine "disinformation campaign," The Daily Beast reported in 2020.

== Just The News (2020–‍present) ==
In January 2020, Solomon launched Just The News, a news media outlet and website. He hosts a podcast, John Solomon Reports, on the website.

=== Access to Trump presidential records ===
On June 19, 2022, Donald Trump sent a letter to the National Archives naming Solomon and Kash Patel as "representatives for access to Presidential records of my administration".

== Reputational damage ==
Paul McCleary, writing for the Columbia Journalism Review in 2007, wrote that Solomon had earned a reputation for hyping stories without solid foundation. In 2012, Mariah Blake, writing for the Columbia Journalism Review, wrote that Solomon "has a history of bending the truth to his storyline," and that he "was notorious for massaging facts to conjure phantom scandals." During the 2004 presidential election between George W. Bush and John Kerry, Thomas Lang wrote for the Columbia Journalism Review that a Solomon story for the Associated Press covered criticism of John Kerry's record on national security appeared to mirror a research report released by the Republican National Committee. Lang wrote that Solomon's story was "a clear demonstration of the influence opposition research is already having on coverage of the [presidential] campaign."

The Washington Post wrote in September 2019 that Solomon's "recent work has been trailed by claims that it is biased and lacks rigor." The Post noted that Solomon had done award-winning investigative work during his early career, but that his work had taken a pronounced conservative bent from the late 2000s and onwards. According to Foreign Policy magazine, Solomon had "grown into a prominent conservative political commentator with a somewhat controversial track record."

In 2007, Deborah Howell, then-ombudsman at The Washington Post, criticized a story that Solomon wrote for The Post which had suggested impropriety by Democratic presidential candidate John Edwards in a real estate purchase; Solomon's reporting omitted context which would have made clear that there was no impropriety. Progressive news outlets ThinkProgress, Media Matters for America and Crooked Media have argued that Solomon's reporting has a conservative bias and that there are multiple instances of inaccuracies. According to The Intercept, Just Security and The Daily Beast, Solomon helps to advance right-wing and pro-Trump conspiracy theories. The New Republic described Solomon's columns for The Hill as "right-wing fever dreams." Independent journalist Marcy Wheeler accused Solomon of manufacturing fake scandals which suggested wrongdoing by those conducting probes into Russian interference in the 2016 election. Reporters who worked under Solomon as an editor have said that he encouraged them to bend the truth to fit a pre-existing narrative.

In January 2018, Solomon published a report for The Hill suggesting that Peter Strzok and Lisa Page had foreknowledge of a Wall Street Journal article and that they themselves had leaked to the newspaper. According to the Huffington Post, Solomon's reporting omitted that the Wall Street Journal article Strzok and Page were discussing was critical of Hillary Clinton and the FBI, Strzok and Page expressed dismay at the fallout from the article, and Strzok and Page criticized unauthorized leaks from the FBI. According to the Huffington Post, "Solomon told HuffPost he was not authorized to speak and does not comment on his reporting. He may simply have been unaware of these three facts when he published his story. But they provide crucial context to an incomplete narrative that has been bouncing around the right-wing echo chamber all week."

== Accolades ==
Solomon has received a number of awards for investigative journalism, among them the 2008 Robert F. Kennedy Journalism Award and the Society of Professional Journalists' National Investigative Award, which he won together with CBS News' 60 Minutes for Evidence of Injustice; in 2002, the Associated Press's Managing Editors Enterprise Reporting Award for What The FBI Knew Before September 11, 2001, and the Gramling Journalism Achievement Award for his coverage of the war on terrorism; in 1992, the White House Correspondents' Association's Raymond Clapper Memorial Award (Second Place) for an investigative series on Ross Perot.
