= Joseph diGenova =

American attorney (born 1945)

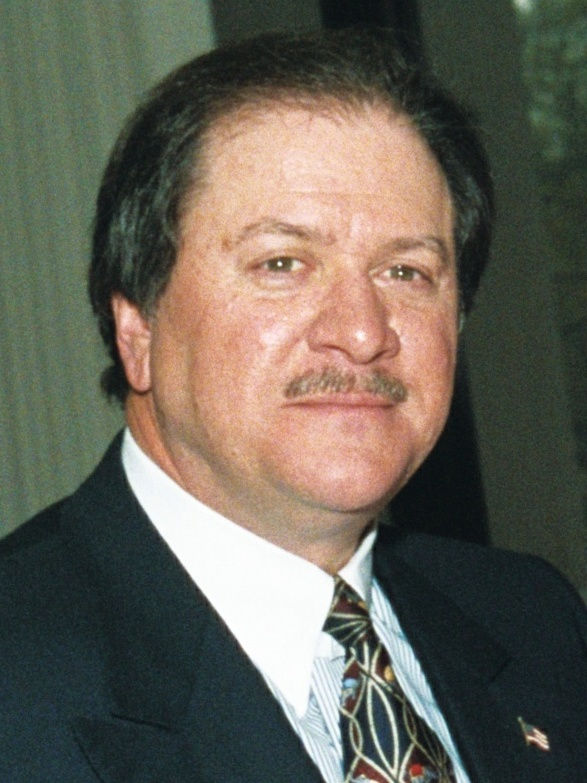
- diGenova in 2002

United States Attorney for the District of Columbia
- In office December 2, 1983 – March 1, 1988
- President: Ronald Reagan
- Preceded by: Stanley S. Harris
- Succeeded by: Jay B. Stephens

Personal details
- Born: February 22, 1945 (age 81) Wilmington, Delaware, U.S.
- Party: Republican
- Spouse: Victoria Toensing (m. 1981)
- Education: University of Cincinnati (BA); Georgetown University (JD)

Joseph diGenova (born February 22, 1945) is an American lawyer and political commentator who served as the United States Attorney for the District of Columbia from 1983 to 1988. He and his wife, Victoria Toensing, are partners in the Washington, D.C., law firm diGenova and Toensing. He is known for promoting conspiracy theories about the Department of Justice and the FBI. He and Toensing frequently appeared on Fox News and Fox Business channels, until diGenova used a November 2019 appearance to spread conspiracy theories about George Soros, leading to widespread calls for him to be banned from the network.

In March 2018, President Donald Trump announced that diGenova and Toensing would join his legal defense team during the Mueller investigation; the appointments were withdrawn days later, citing an unspecified conflict of interest, though Trump personal attorney Jay Sekulow said they might assist in other legal matters. In July 2019, diGenova and Toensing began representing Ukrainian oligarch Dmitry Firtash to assist his efforts to avoid extradition to the United States under a federal indictment, as their associate and Trump's personal attorney Rudy Giuliani sought information in Ukraine to damage Democratic presidential candidate Joe Biden. In November 2020, Trump named diGenova, Toensing, Sidney Powell and Jenna Ellis to join a legal team led by Giuliani to overturn the results of the 2020 presidential election in which Trump was defeated.

In April 2026, diGenova was selected by the Department of Justice to lead an inquiry "into whether former federal officials committed crimes in investigating President Trump", but resigned in September 2026 and expressed that "If you want indictments where there's no evidence, you have an ethical problem."

== Career in law and politics ==
DiGenova was an aide to Republican Senator Charles Mathias of Maryland, eventually serving as Mathias' legislative director. After Republicans won the U.S. Senate in the 1980 elections, diGenova was named chief counsel and staff director of the Senate Rules Committee and counsel to the Senate Judiciary, Governmental Affairs, and Select Intelligence committees.

=== U.S. attorney ===
As a U.S. attorney, diGenova led the prosecution of Jonathan Pollard, who pleaded guilty in 1987 to spying for Israel.

He also led investigations into corruption in the administration of Washington, D.C., Mayor Marion Barry that led to convictions of 12 officials, including two deputy mayors.

=== Counsel investigations ===
DiGenova later served as Independent Counsel investigating the 1992 preelection search of then-candidate Bill Clinton's passport file by officials of the George H. W. Bush administration. DiGenova concluded that the passport search had been "stupid, dumb and partisan," but not illegal, and that the government should apologize to the officials who ordered the search.

DiGenova and his wife, Victoria Toensing, started their Washington law firm, diGenova & Toensing, in January 1996.

In 1997, diGenova was named Special Counsel to investigate the International Brotherhood of Teamsters; afterward he was named to an independent review board to monitor the Teamsters.

== First Trump presidency ==
=== Scooter Libby ===
DiGenova called on President Trump to pardon Scooter Libby, adviser of Dick Cheney, who was found guilty of perjury in an investigation revolving around leaks of sensitive classified material. DiGenova is married to Libby's lawyer, Victoria Toensing. Trump pardoned Libby on April 13, 2018.

=== Russian interference in the 2016 election ===
DiGenova, who frequently appears as a commentator on Fox News, has accused FBI officials of trying to "frame" President Donald Trump for "nonexistent" crimes. On March 19, 2018, he and his spouse, Victoria Toensing, were hired to serve on Trump's legal team for the Special Counsel investigation. However, Trump backtracked the hires several days later due to potential conflicts of interest. The president hoped diGenova could function as a stand-in for him on television and spearhead the attacks on Mueller and the investigation.

In April 2018, diGenova called for the firing of Deputy Attorney General Rod Rosenstein, said that special counsel Robert Mueller's team investigating Russian interference in the 2016 election were "legal terrorists" and called former FBI Director James Comey "a dirty cop". In May 2018 tweet, Trump quoted diGenova as saying "The recusal of Jeff Sessions was an unforced betrayal of the President of the United States."

On February 21, 2019, diGenova stated in Laura Ingraham's podcast that the US is in a civil war and that he advises friends to prepare for total war by voting and buying guns.

=== Kavanaugh appointment ===
On September 18, 2018, diGenova discounted allegations that U.S. Supreme Court nominee Brett Kavanaugh, when 17 years old, had sexually assaulted a 15-year-old Christine Blasey Ford at a party. The allegations referred to a time when Kavanaugh was attending Georgetown Preparatory School. On Fox News, diGenova said if Ford testified, "she's going to look like the loon that she is."

=== Ukraine investigations ===
In July 2019, diGenova and his wife, Victoria Toensing, were hired by the Ukrainian oligarch Dmytro Firtash, to defend Firtash from extradition to the United States on corruption charges related to a mining permit in India. In 2017, the United States Justice Department described Firtash as an "upper-echelon [associate] of Russian organized crime." As a middleman for the Russian natural gas giant Gazprom, Firtash was known for funneling money to campaigns of pro-Russia politicians in Ukraine and is also a onetime business partner of Paul Manafort, a Trump 2016 campaign chairman. When he was vice president, Joe Biden had urged the Ukrainian government to eliminate middlemen such as Firtash from the country's natural gas industry, and to reduce the country's reliance on imports of Russian natural gas.

In August 2019, diGenova and Toensing met with Attorney General William Barr to argue against the charges for Firtash. Prior to that meeting, Barr had been briefed in detail on the initial Trump–Ukraine scandal whistleblower complaint within the CIA that had been forwarded to the Justice Department, as well as on Giuliani's activities in Ukraine. Barr declined to intercede, according to sources who talked to The Washington Post.

In October 2019, Lev Parnas, a businessman who was working for diGenova and Toensing's firm as an interpreter in the Firtash case, was one of two men arrested at Dulles International Airport and accused by federal prosecutors of funneling foreign money into U.S. elections. The New York Times reported in November 2019 that Giuliani had directed Parnas to approach Firtash with the recommendation to hire diGenova and Toensing, with the proposition that Firtash could help to provide compromising information on Joe Biden, an arrangement Parnas's attorney Joseph Bondy described was "part of any potential resolution to [Firtash's] extradition matter." In November 2019, Bondy told The Washington Post that Parnas had been part of "a group that met frequently in spring 2019 at the Trump International Hotel in Washington, D.C., to discuss the Biden matter, among other topics. The group, according to Bondy, was convened by Giuliani, Trump's personal attorney, and included Parnas, his business associate Igor Fruman, as well as journalist John Solomon and the husband-and-wife legal team of Joe diGenova and Victoria Toensing." After Firtash hired diGenova and Toensing, Giuliani acquired a statement from former Ukrainian prosecutor general Viktor Shokin that falsely alleged Biden had pressured Ukraine to fire him in an effort to cover up corruption by Biden and his son. Shokin's statement noted that it was prepared "at the request of lawyers acting for Dmitry Firtash." Giuliani had presented the Shokin statement during television appearances, and Bloomberg News reported that its sources told them Giuliani's publicity of the Shokin statement had greatly reduced the chances of the Justice Department dropping the charges against Firtash, as it would appear to be a political quid pro quo.

DiGenova and Toensing worked with Rudy Giuliani on opposition research from Ukraine to be used against the 2020 Democratic candidate Joe Biden, according to Fox News Sunday. All three were working off the books, outside the administration, according to Fox News. "The only person in government who knows what they were doing is President Trump," Fox host Chris Wallace said. DiGenova called the story "categorically false."

DiGenova and Toensing are lawyers for John Solomon, a conservative columnist who has written stories favorable to Trump on scandals involving Ukraine and Russia. "John Solomon has been a client of our firm for a very long time," diGenova told Politico.

In November 2019, in an appearance on Fox News, diGenova claimed that George Soros "controls a very large part of the career foreign service of the United States State Department" and "also controls the activities of FBI agents overseas who work for NGO's, work with NGO's. That was very evident in Ukraine." The Open Society Foundation, founded by Soros, described diGenova's claims as "beyond rhetorical ugliness, beyond fiction, beyond ludicrous" and requested that Fox News provide an on-air retraction of diGenova's claims, and stop providing diGenova with a platform. Although the network never publicly announced it had banned diGenova, as of September 2020, diGenova had not appeared on Fox following the incident. In September 2020, diGenova said, "I don't know what George Soros has on Suzanne Scott, the head of Fox, but the bottom line is this: that network is compromised when it comes to Soros."

=== False claims of fraud related to the 2020 presidential election ===
In November 2020, President Donald Trump named diGenova, Toensing, Sidney Powell and Jenna Ellis to join a legal team led by Rudy Giuliani to challenge the results of the 2020 presidential election in which Trump was defeated.

On November 30, 2020, diGenova used an appearance on The Howie Carr Show (released on YouTube) to call for Chris Krebs to be "drawn and quartered. Taken out at dawn and shot". DiGenova's specific criticism was that Krebs "thinks the election went well". Krebs was the former Director of the Cybersecurity and Infrastructure Security Agency for the United States Department of Homeland Security and had been fired by Trump earlier that month for contradicting Trump's false and baseless claims of widespread election fraud. On December 8 Krebs filed a civil lawsuit against diGenova, the Trump campaign, and Newsmax TV, accusing them of "defamation, intentional infliction of emotional distress, aiding and abetting, and civil conspiracy". He said that he has received "a barrage of threats and harassment" as a result of diGenova's comments and "faces a genuine risk of imminent harm."

DiGenova and his wife were among several Trump associates who were emailed by OANN anchor Christina Bobb on December 13, 2020, regarding efforts by Republicans in seven states to appoint false electors and create fraudulent certificates of ascertainment to be submitted to vice president Mike Pence for certification on January 6, 2021.

== Second Trump presidency ==
=== JFK assassination documents release ===
Three days after entering office for the second time in January 2025, Trump signed an executive order to declassify the remaining documents pertaining to the assassination of John F. Kennedy within 15 days. More than 60,000 documents were released two months later on March 18. The unredacted documents included the Social Security numbers and other sensitive personal data of former congressional staffers including diGenova. In response, diGenova announced his intent to sue the National Archives for violating the Privacy Act of 1974.

=== Investigating federal officials who investigated Trump ===
In April 2026, diGenova was selected by the Department of Justice to lead an inquiry "into whether former federal officials committed crimes in investigating President Trump". In September 2026, diGenova resigned. He told the New York Post, "If you want indictments where there's no evidence, you have an ethical problem." Later, he clarified his position to The Associated Press, saying that while he believed there was evidence of wrongdoing, "some people want to get there faster than others--and you can't do that."

In September 2026, diGenova resigned as the prosecutor overseeing a Justice Department investigation into officials involved in investigations of Donald Trump, following disagreements with Justice Department officials over the scope and pace of the probe.
