= Victoria Toensing =

American lawyer

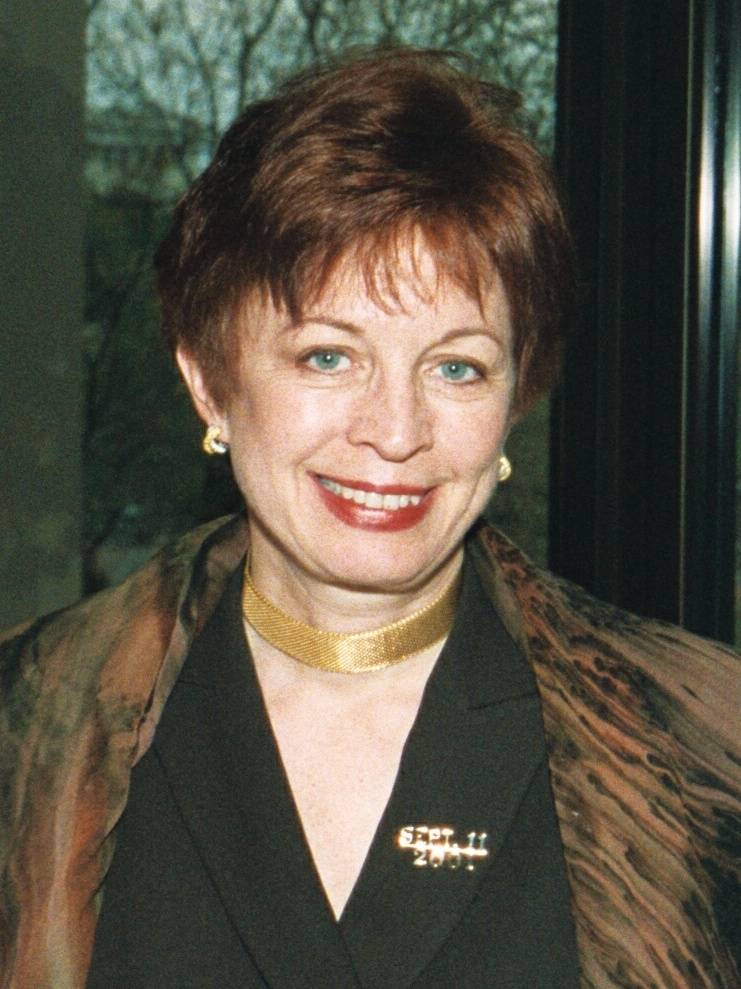
- Toensing in 2002
- Born: Victoria Ann Long; October 16, 1941 (age 84); Colón, Panama
- Education: Indiana University Bloomington (BS); University of Detroit (JD)
- Political party: Republican
- Spouse(s): Trent Toensing (m. 1962; div. 1976) Joseph diGenova (m. 1981)
- Children: 3, including Amy Toensing

Victoria Ann Toensing (née Long; born October 16, 1941) is an American attorney, Republican Party operative and with her husband, Joseph diGenova, a partner in the Washington law firm diGenova & Toensing. Toensing and diGenova frequently appeared on Fox News and Fox Business channels, until diGenova used a November 2019 appearance to spread conspiracy theories about George Soros, leading to widespread calls for him to be banned from the network.

In 2019, Toensing and diGenova began representing Ukrainian oligarch Dmitry Firtash in his efforts to block extradition to the United States under a federal indictment and became embroiled in the Trump–Ukraine scandal. The couple has worked with Rudy Giuliani in support of President Donald Trump beginning in 2018, and was named to join a legal team led by Giuliani to overturn the results of the 2020 United States presidential election in which Trump was defeated.

== Early life and education ==
Toensing graduated from Columbus High School in 1958 and Indiana University Bloomington in 1962 with a degree in education. Toensing was active with the Republican Party in Michigan. She taught high-school English until she entered law school, earning a Juris Doctor from the University of Detroit School of Law in 1975.

She joined the U.S. attorney's office in Detroit, where she prosecuted narcotics cases.

In 1981, Toensing became chief counsel to Arizona Senator Barry Goldwater on the Senate Select Committee on Intelligence, where she helped draft the Intelligence Identities Protection Act of 1982.

== News and politics ==
=== Reagan administration ===
Toensing was a deputy assistant attorney general in the Justice Department during the Reagan administration. She led a counterterrorist investigation into the 15 May Organization for the bombing and attempted bombing of two Pan Am jets in 1982.

=== Clinton investigations ===
DiGenova and Toensing established their law firm, diGenova & Toensing, in January 1996.

Emily Bazelon of Slate has called Toensing "a blanketer of the airwaves about the tawdriness of the Lewinsky affair." Toensing and her husband made regular appearances on television claiming that they were the target of investigations by the Clinton administration.

Commenting on their role in the 1998 House of Representatives Teamsters investigation, Rep. Bill Clay, a Missouri Democrat, said, "They've become a public spectacle, which means they can't be impartial... It's a payoff from Newt Gingrich and the Republican Party to both Victoria Toensing and Joe diGenova.... They have been on television over 200 times and not once have they been talking about an issue we're paying them $25,000 a month to handle for the Congress. It's a hell of a part-time job."

=== The WISH List ===
Toensing was a founder and board member of The WISH List, a PAC seeking to elect pro-choice Republican women to public office. The PAC was inspired by EMILY's List, a pro-choice Democratic PAC, and Toensing advocated for a "big tent" Republican Party that includes both pro-life and pro-choice members.

=== Valerie Plame investigation ===
Toensing was a frequent Republican commentator in the media during the Plame affair, a political scandal that led to the conviction of Scooter Libby, assistant to Vice President Dick Cheney. The scandal involved the public outing of Valerie Plame as a Central Intelligence Agency (CIA) agent, shortly after Plame's husband, former diplomat Joseph C. Wilson, wrote an op-ed in 2003 alleging that the Bush administration manipulated intelligence in the run-up to the invasion of Iraq. In March 2005, Toensing submitted an amicus curiae brief in support of Matt Cooper and Judith Miller, two journalists who were subpoenaed in the Plame investigation for refusing to reveal information obtained from confidential sources. In the brief, she "argued that the law couldn't have been broken when Valerie Plame's cover as a CIA agent was blown because her status wasn't really covert." She also contended that Plame did not have a cover to be blown, citing a July 23, 2004, article in The Washington Times that argued that her status as an undercover CIA agent may have been known to Russian and Cuban intelligence operations prior to the article (by Robert Novak) that revealed her status as a CIA employee.

In April 2018, Toensing represented Scooter Libby at the time when President Donald Trump pardoned him. Libby, the assistant to Vice President Dick Cheney, had been convicted of obstruction of justice and perjury in 2007 regarding the leak of Plame's identity.

=== 2008 election ===
Toensing supported former Tennessee Senator Fred Thompson in the Republican primaries for the 2008 presidential election.

=== Involvement with Trump, his associates and Ukraine ===
On March 19, 2018, Toensing and her husband, diGenova, were hired by President Donald Trump to serve on his legal team for the Special Counsel investigation. DiGenova served as the United States Attorney for the District of Columbia from 1983 to 1988. However, Trump cancelled the hires several days later due to potential conflicts of interest, though Trump personal attorney Jay Sekulow said they might assist in other legal matters.

Toensing represents Mark Corallo, who had previously served as a spokesman for Trump's private legal team during the investigation into possible collusion between members of Trump's 2016 campaign and the Russian government. Robert Mueller interviewed Corallo as part of the Special Counsel investigation.

Toensing has also represented Sam Clovis, a former Trump campaign co-chair, and Erik Prince, the founder of the private military company Blackwater, who has informally advised Trump.

In spring 2019, Toensing began representing former Ukrainian prosecutor general Viktor Shokin and then-prosecutor general Yuriy Lutsenko. Giuliani and his associates met with Lutsenko in early 2019 to discuss possible investigations of Democratic presidential candidate Joe Biden and his son Hunter. Then-United States ambassador to Ukraine Marie Yovanovitch had openly criticized Lutsenko for his poor anti-corruption record, and Lutsenko spread false allegations about Yovanovitch, which he later recanted. Giuliani considered Yovanovitch an obstacle to investigations of the Bidens and persuaded Trump to remove her from office in spring 2019. By April 2021, a continuing federal investigation was examining Yovanovitch's removal and evidence relating to Toensing.

In July 2019, Toensing and her husband were hired by the Ukrainian oligarch Dmitry Firtash to defend him from extradition to the United States on a bribery indictment. He has been living in Austria since being arrested there at the request of American authorities in 2014 and released on $155 million bail. In 2017, the United States Justice Department described Firtash as an "upper-echelon [associate] of Russian organized crime." As a middleman for the Russian natural gas giant Gazprom, Firtash was known for funneling money to campaigns of pro-Russia politicians in Ukraine and is also a onetime business partner of Paul Manafort, a Trump 2016 campaign chairman. Firtash obtained his middleman position with the agreement of Russian president Vladimir Putin and, according to Firtash, Russian organized crime boss Semion Mogilevich. When he was vice president, Biden had urged the Ukrainian government to eliminate middlemen such as Firtash from the country's natural gas industry, and to reduce the country's reliance on imports of Russian natural gas.

After Firtash hired diGenova and Toensing, Giuliani acquired a statement from former Ukrainian prosecutor general Viktor Shokin that falsely alleged Biden had pressured Ukraine to fire him in an effort to cover up corruption committed by himself and his son. Shokin's statement noted that it was prepared "at the request of lawyers acting for Dmitry Firtash ('DF'), for use in legal proceedings in Austria." Giuliani had presented the Shokin statement during television appearances, and Bloomberg News reported that its sources told them Giuliani's publicity of the Shokin statement had greatly reduced the chances of the Justice Department dropping the charges against Firtash, as it would appear to be a political quid pro quo.

In August 2019, Toensing and diGenova met with Attorney General William Barr to argue against the charges on Firtash. Prior to that meeting, Barr had been briefed in detail on the initial Trump-Ukraine scandal whistleblower complaint within the CIA that had been forwarded to the Justice Department, as well as on Giuliani's activities in Ukraine. Barr declined to intercede in the case, according to sources who talked to The Washington Post.

In October 2019, Lev Parnas, a businessman who was working for diGenova and Toensing's firm as an interpreter in the Firtash case, was one of two men arrested at Dulles International Airport and accused by federal prosecutors of funneling foreign money into U.S. elections. The New York Times reported in November 2019 that Giuliani had directed Parnas to approach Firtash with the recommendation to hire diGenova and Toensing, with the proposition that Firtash could help to provide compromising information on Biden, an arrangement Parnas' attorney Joseph Bondy described was "part of any potential resolution to [Firtash's] extradition matter." In November 2019, Bondy told The Washington Post that Parnas had been part of a group that met frequently in spring 2019 at the Trump International Hotel in Washington, D.C., to discuss the Biden matter, among other topics. The group, according to Bondy, was convened by Giuliani, Trump's personal attorney, and included Parnas, his business associate Igor Fruman, as well as journalist John Solomon and Toensing and diGenova. Phone records unearthed during impeachment proceedings in 2019 revealed that there were regular contacts between Solomon, Giuliani, Toensing, Toensing's client and Giuliani associate Lev Parnas, and other Trump allies.

Toensing and diGenova were frequent guests on Fox News and Fox Business throughout 2019. In November 2019, diGenova used an appearance on Fox Business to spread conspiracy theories about George Soros and make unevidenced claims that Soros controlled the State Department. After that appearance, which resulted in widespread calls for Fox to ban diGenova, Toensing and diGenova stopped appearing on the network.

In November 2020, Trump named Toensing, diGenova, Sidney Powell and Jenna Ellis to join a legal team led by Giuliani to challenge the results of the 2020 presidential election in which Trump was defeated.

On April 28, 2021, federal agents executed a search warrant related to the Justice Department's ongoing criminal probe into Giuliani's pro-Trump political activities in Ukraine, at the home of Toensing, taking her cell phone. Her law firm released a statement asserting she had been told she was not a target of an investigation. In a May 2021 court filing, investigators disclosed that in late 2019 they acquired a search warrant for Toensing's iCloud account, and that of Giuliani, and for an email account belonging to her. Toensing and Giuiliani demanded to review the documents underlying the warrants, asserting their attorney-client privilege with clients may have been violated, which investigators disputed, arguing the attorneys had no special privilege to review the documents prior to any charges. Investigators said they employed a "filter team" to prevent them from seeing information potentially protected by attorney-client privilege.

Toensing and her husband were among several Trump associates who were emailed by OANN anchor Christina Bobb on December 13, 2020, regarding efforts by Republicans in seven states to appoint false electors and create fraudulent certificates of ascertainment to be submitted to vice president Mike Pence for certification on January 6, 2021.

== Personal life ==
The former Victoria Long married Trent Toensing in 1962; the couple divorced in 1976. In 1981, she married Joseph diGenova. DiGenova and Toensing are partners in the eponymous Washington, D.C. law firm.

Toensing has three children from her first marriage, including Todd Toensing of Jericho, Vermont; Amy Toensing, a photojournalist; and Brady Toensing, who joined the Justice Department in June 2019 as senior counsel in its Office of Legal Policy. Formerly, Brady Toensing was vice chair of the Vermont Republican Party, as well as a high-profile and controversial Vermont lawyer, and partner in his mother's and step-father's law firm. The Justice Department has said that Brady Toensing is recused from matters involving the diGenova & Toensing law firm, including the Trump–Ukraine scandal. It was asserted that he helped to choose judicial nominees for Trump.
