= Impeachment inquiry into Donald Trump =

2019 US investigation of president

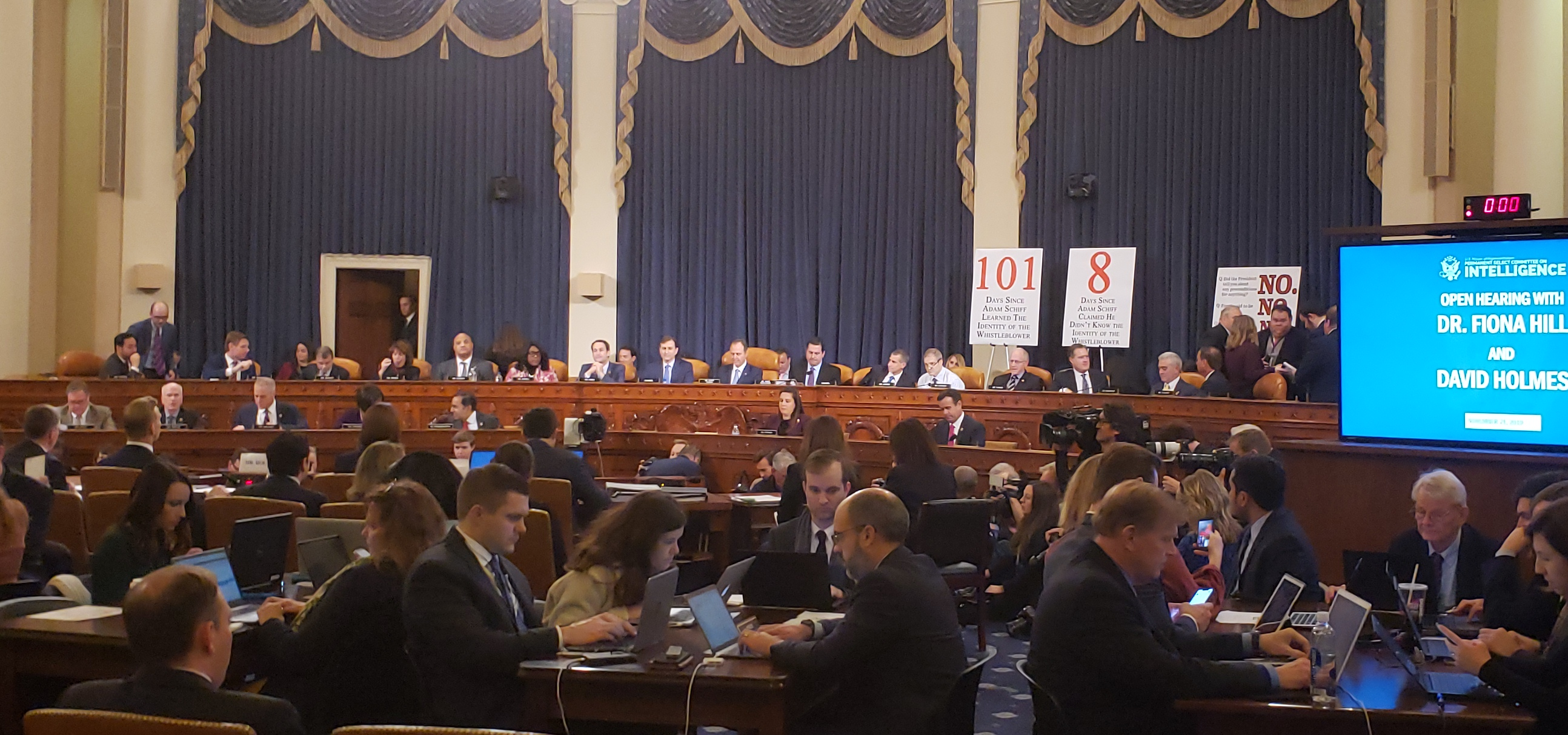
- Open hearing testimony of Fiona Hill and David Holmes on November 21, 2019
- Accused: Donald Trump, 45th President of the United States
- Proponents: Nancy Pelosi (Speaker of the House of Representatives)
- Committees: Financial Services; Foreign Affairs; Intelligence; Judiciary; Oversight; Ways and Means
- Committee chairs: Maxine Waters (Financial Services); Eliot Engel (Foreign Affairs); Adam Schiff (Intelligence); Jerry Nadler (Judiciary); Elijah Cummings (Oversight) –until Oct. 17; Carolyn Maloney (Oversight) –beginning Oct. 17; Richard Neal (Ways and Means)
- Date: September 24 – December 3, 2019 (2 months, 1 week and 2 days)
- Outcome: Impeachment inquiry completed; House Judiciary Committee approved two articles of impeachment
- Charges: Abuse of power; Obstruction of Congress
- Cause: Allegations that Trump sought help from Ukrainian authorities to favor him in the 2020 U.S. presidential election

Congressional votes

Voting in the House Judiciary Committee
- Accusation: First article—abuse of power
- Votes in favor: 23
- Votes against: 17
- Result: Approved
- Accusation: Second article—obstruction of Congress
- Votes in favor: 23
- Votes against: 17
- Result: Approved
- The House voted on December 18, 2019, to impeach Donald Trump on both charges.

The inquiry process which preceded the first impeachment of Donald Trump, 45th president of the United States, was initiated by then-House speaker Nancy Pelosi on September 24, 2019, after a whistleblower alleged that Donald Trump may have abused the power of the presidency. Trump was accused of withholding military aid as a means of pressuring newly elected president of Ukraine Volodymyr Zelenskyy to pursue investigations of Joe Biden and his son Hunter (Note: During the hearings, Gordon Sondland testified that Trump only wanted Ukraine to announce such an investigation and that it did not actually need to be performed.) and to investigate a conspiracy theory that Ukraine, not Russia, was behind interference in the 2016 presidential election. More than a week after Trump had put a hold on the previously approved aid, (Note: Intended to help Ukraine in its war against Russian-backed separatist forces in Donbas) he made these requests in a July 25 phone call with the Ukrainian president, which the whistleblower said was intended to help Trump's reelection bid.

Believing critical military aid would be revoked, Zelenskyy made plans to announce investigations into the Bidens on the September 13 episode of CNN's Fareed Zakaria GPS. After Trump was told of the whistleblower complaint in late August and elements of the events had begun to leak, the aid was released on September 11 and the planned interview was cancelled. Trump declassified a non-verbatim summary of the call on September 24, the day the impeachment inquiry began. The whistleblower's complaint was given to Congress the following day and subsequently released to the public. The White House corroborated several of the allegations, including that a record of the call between Trump and Zelenskyy had been stored in a highly restricted system in the White House normally reserved for classified information.

In October, three congressional committees (Intelligence, Oversight, and Foreign Affairs) deposed witnesses including Ukraine ambassador Bill Taylor, Laura Cooper (the top Pentagon official overseeing Ukraine-related U.S. policy), and former White House official Fiona Hill. Witnesses testified that they believed Trump wanted Zelenskyy to publicly announce investigations into the Bidens and Burisma (a Ukrainian natural gas company on whose board Hunter Biden had served) and 2016 election interference. On October 8, in a letter from White House Counsel Pat Cipollone to House speaker Pelosi, the White House officially responded that it would not cooperate with the investigation due to concerns including that there had not yet been a vote of the full House of Representatives and that interviews of witnesses were being conducted privately. On October 17, White House acting chief of staff Mick Mulvaney responded to a reporter's allegation of quid pro quo saying: "We do that all the time with foreign policy. Get over it." He walked back his comments later, asserting that there had been "absolutely no quid pro quo" and that Trump had withheld military aid to Ukraine over concerns of the country's corruption.

On October 31, the House of Representatives voted 232–196 to establish procedures for public hearings, which started on November 13. As hearings began, House Intelligence Committee chairman Adam Schiff said Trump may have committed bribery, which is listed in Article Two as an impeachable offense. Private and public congressional testimony by twelve government witnesses in November 2019 presented evidence that Trump demanded political favors in exchange for official action. On December 10, the House Judiciary Committee unveiled their articles of impeachment: one for abuse of power and one for obstruction of Congress. Three days later, the Judiciary Committee voted along party lines (23–17) to approve both articles. On December 16, the House Judiciary Committee released a report specifying criminal bribery and wire fraud charges as part of the abuse of power charge. On December 18, the House voted mostly along party lines to impeach the president on both charges. The vote on Article One, abuse of power, was 230–197, with one vote of present. All Republicans voted against the article, joined by two Democrats. The vote on Article Two, obstruction of Congress, was 229–198, with one vote of present. All Republicans voted against the article, joined by three Democrats. Recent Republican, five-term congressman Justin Amash of Michigan, also voted for impeachment; the frequent Trump critic had declared himself an Independent in July.

== Background ==
=== Previous calls for impeachment ===
Efforts to impeach President Trump had been made by a variety of people and groups.

==== Early efforts ====
The first efforts in the Republican-controlled Congress were initiated in 2017 by Representatives Al Green and Brad Sherman, both Democrats (D), in response to Trump's obstructions of justice in the Russian influence investigations begun during the first year of Trump's presidency. A December 2017 resolution of impeachment failed in the House by a 58–364 vote margin.

Democrats gained control of the House of Representatives following the 2018 elections and made Nancy Pelosi the new Speaker. While she opposed any move toward impeachment, she supported multiple committees' respective investigations into Trump's actions and finances. On January 17, 2019, new allegations involving Trump surfaced, claiming he instructed his long-time lawyer, Michael Cohen, to lie under oath about Trump's conflict-of-interest involvement with the Russian government to erect a Trump Tower in Moscow. This also sparked requests for an investigation and for the president to "resign or be impeached" should such claims be substantiated.

==== Special Counsel Mueller's Report ====
The report of Special Counsel Robert Mueller, released on April 18, 2019, found that soon after the firing of James Comey and the appointment of the Special Counsel, Trump "engaged in conduct ... involving public attacks on the investigation, non-public acts to control it, and efforts in both public and private to encourage witnesses not to cooperate with the investigation." The Mueller Report found "multiple acts by the President that were capable of exerting undue influence over law enforcement investigations, including the Russian-interference and obstruction investigation." For example, the Mueller Report found "substantial evidence" or "evidence" that:

- "The President's attempts to remove the Special Counsel were linked to the Special Counsel's oversight of investigations that involved the President's conduct";
- "The President's effort to have (Attorney General) Sessions limit the scope of the Special Counsel's investigation to future election interference was intended to prevent further investigative scrutiny of the President's and his campaign's conduct";
- "In repeatedly urging (White House counsel Donald) McGahn to dispute that he was ordered to have the Special Counsel terminated, the President acted for the purpose of influencing McGahn's account in order to deflect or prevent further scrutiny of the President's conduct towards the investigation."
- "... at least one purpose of the President's conduct towards (Attorney General) Jeff Sessions was to have Sessions assume control over the Russia investigation and supervise it in a way that would restrict its scope ... A reasonable inference ... is that the President believed that an unrecused Attorney General would play a protective role and could shield the President from the ongoing Russia investigation."
- "... could support the inference that the President intended to discourage (attorney Michael) Cohen from cooperating with the government because Cohen's information would shed adverse light on the President's campaign-period conduct and statements."
- "... the President's actions had the potential to influence (campaign adviser Paul) Manafort's decision on whether to cooperate with the government ... The President's public statements during the Manafort trial, including during jury deliberations also had the potential to influence the trial jury."

Special Counsel Robert Mueller concluded that "The President's efforts to influence the investigation were mostly unsuccessful, but that is largely because the persons who surrounded the President declined to carry out orders or accede to his requests." Nevertheless, the Mueller Report made no definitive conclusion as to whether Trump had committed criminal obstruction of justice. Instead, the Special Counsel strongly hinted that it was up to Congress to make such a determination based on the evidence presented in the report. Congressional support for an impeachment inquiry increased as a result.

==== After the Special Counsel's Report ====
House Speaker Nancy Pelosi initially continued to resist calls for impeachment. In May 2019, she indicated that Trump's continued actions, which she characterized as obstruction of justice and refusal to honor congressional subpoenas, might make an impeachment inquiry necessary. An increasing number of Democrats and a then-Republican representative of the House, Justin Amash (who later became an independent), were requesting such an inquiry.

- H. Res. 13 (alleging interference with the Mueller investigation) introduced on January 3, 2019, by Representative Sherman (D-California): immediately referred to the House Judiciary Committee and to Subcommittee on the Constitution, Civil Rights, and Civil Liberties on February 4, 2019.
- H. Res. 257 (which would launch an impeachment inquiry with no specific allegations) introduced on March 27, 2019, by Representative Rashida Tlaib (D-Michigan): referred to the House Rules Committee.
- H. Res. 396 (which names 19 areas of inquiry) introduced on May 22, 2019, by Representative Sheila Jackson Lee (D-Texas): referred to the House Rules Committee.
- H. Res. 498 (which alleges Trump is unfit for office due to racist comments) introduced on July 17, 2019, by Representative Green (D-Texas): a privileged resolution (Note: Privileged business takes precedence over the regular order of business, so the House addressed it immediately.) which was blocked from proceeding by a vote of 332–95.

Fewer than 20 Representatives in the House supported impeachment by January 2019, but this number grew after the Mueller report was released and after Robert Mueller testified in July, up to around 140 Representatives before the Trump–Ukraine scandal surfaced.

Soon after the release of the Mueller report, Trump began urging an investigation into the origins of the Russia probe, wanting to "investigate the investigators" and possibly discredit the conclusions of the FBI and Mueller. In April 2019, Attorney General William Barr announced that he had launched a review of the origins of the FBI's investigation, even though the origins of the probe were already being investigated by the Justice Department's inspector general and by U.S. attorney John W. Huber, who had been appointed to the same task in 2018 by then-Attorney General Jeff Sessions. Barr assigned U.S. Attorney John Durham to lead the probe, and Trump directed the U.S. Intelligence Community to "promptly provide assistance and information" to Barr, and delegated to him the "full and complete authority" to declassify any related documents. Although Durham was nominally in charge of the investigation, Barr himself began contacting foreign governments to ask for information about the origins of the FBI probe. Barr personally traveled to the United Kingdom and Italy to seek information; the Italian Parliament is expected to begin its own investigation into Barr's meetings with Italian intelligence agencies. At Barr's request, Trump himself phoned the prime minister of Australia, Scott Morrison, to ask for assistance.

=== Trump–Ukraine scandal ===
==== Rudy Giuliani and his business associates ====
In 2018, Florida businessmen Lev Parnas and Igor Fruman hired Trump's personal attorney Rudy Giuliani as a consultant in their security company, paying him $500,000. In turn, Fruman and Parnas assisted him in his search in Ukraine for damaging information about Trump's political opponents. Giuliani sent Fruman and Parnas to Ukraine to seek information to undermine the Special Counsel's investigation and damage Biden's presidential campaign. At the same time, Fruman and Parnas were being paid by Dmytro Firtash, a Ukrainian oligarch, with alleged ties to Russian organized crime and the Kremlin, who is facing federal bribery charges in the U.S. and is fighting extradition from Austria. (Note: Firtash also hired Joseph diGenova and Victoria Toensing, a husband and wife team of attorneys with ties to Giuliani and Trump and who frequently appear on Fox News to promote conspiracy theories related to Ukraine. DiGenova and Toensing met with Attorney General William Barr and other Justice Department officials in a failed attempt to convince the prosecutors to drop the charges against Firtash.)

From at least May 2019 to August 2019, Trump and Giuliani pressed the Ukrainian government to launch an investigation that would have negatively affected Trump's political rival Joe Biden in the 2020 election. Giuliani and his associates asked Ukrainian president Volodymyr Zelenskyy to announce an investigation into the business activities of Hunter Biden. The pressure tactics were developed by Giuliani and Gordon Sondland and applied in part by Parnas and Fruman. Zelenskyy reportedly felt rattled by the pressure, according to Amos Hochstein, a former diplomat and a member of Naftogaz's supervisory board, who alerted the National Security Council (NSC) of the matter in May 2019. Fruman and Parnas were arrested at Washington Dulles International Airport on October 9, 2019, on campaign finance-related charges brought by federal prosecutors in New York City.

The proposed investigation of Biden was based on a 2015 push by the U.S. to remove the Ukrainian prosecutor Viktor Shokin because he had been ignoring corruption in Ukraine and protecting political elites. At the time, this request had bipartisan support in the U.S. Congress and was also supported by the European Union. (Note: Ukraine is not a European Union member, but has sought to become one, a move that Russia and pro-Russia Ukrainians have sought to obstruct.) Joe Biden, who at the time was vice president, served as the face of this request. Ukraine fired Shokin in early 2016. Trump claimed that Biden's true motivation was to protect his son Hunter, who served on the board of directors of the Ukrainian natural gas company Burisma Holdings offshore, even though Shokin had placed his predecessor's investigation into Burisma on hold. Despite Trump's allegations, no one has produced evidence of any criminal wrongdoing by the Bidens.

In a January 2020 letter to Judiciary Committee chairman Jerry Nadler, Schiff referred to a partially redacted text message in which Parnas told Giuliani "trying to get us mr Z," which Schiff asserted showed that Parnas "continued to try to arrange a meeting with President Zelensky." A subsequently unredacted version of the message showed that days later Parnas sent Giuliani a document that appeared to contain notes from an interview with Mykola Zlochevsky, the owner of Burisma Holdings, casting doubt on Schiff's interpretation.

==== Withholding of military aid and July 25 phone call ====
Whistleblower complaint dated August 12, 2019, regarding a July 25 phone conversation between Trump and Zelenskyy

Memorandum of the call between Trump and Zelenskyy released by the White House on September 25, 2019

By July 18, 2019, Trump had—without explanation—put a hold on $391 million in congressionally approved military aid to Ukraine. In a July 25 phone call, Trump repeatedly asked Volodymyr Zelenskyy to launch two investigations in cooperation with Giuliani and Attorney General Barr. One proposed investigation would concern a conspiracy theory—which originated on 4chan in 2017 and was spread by blogs, social media, and Fox News— that connected the American cybersecurity technology company CrowdStrike to Ukrainian actors supposedly interfering in the 2016 election. Trump had been repeatedly told by his own aides that this allegation is false, but refused to accept those assurances. The other proposed investigation would concern Joe and Hunter Biden. At the time of the inquiry, Joe Biden was the leading presidential candidate in Democratic Party primary polling, making him Trump's most likely 2020 opponent.

This July 25 phone call was the subject of an anonymous complaint filed on August 12 in accordance with the Intelligence Community Whistleblower Protection Act. In late August, Trump was notified of the whistleblower's complaint. Congress and the public became aware of it on September 9. Two days later, Trump lifted the hold on military aid. House Intelligence Committee Chairman Adam Schiff said on September 13 that he had issued a subpoena to Acting Director of National Intelligence Joseph Maguire, as Maguire had failed to release the whistleblower's complaint to the congressional intelligence committees, as was arguably required by the relevant statute. Schiff argued that the complaint might have been withheld from Congress "in an unlawful effort to protect the President and conceal from the Committee information related to his possible 'serious or flagrant' misconduct, abuse of power, or violation of law".

On September 24, the White House released a non-verbatim memorandum of Trump's conversation with Zelenskyy. (Note: Alexander Vindman later testified that this transcript omitted crucial words and phrases, including 'Burisma', the name of the company Hunter Biden had worked for.) The next day, the whistleblower complaint was released to Congress. Trump did not mention the hold on military aid in his conversation with Zelenskyy, but repeatedly pointed out that the U.S. has been "very very good" to Ukraine, with which Zelenskyy expressed agreement. Zelenskyy subsequently asked about obtaining more U.S. Javelins, to which Trump replied, "I would like you to do us a favor though" and requested the investigations into Crowdstrike. The memorandum of the conversation confirmed the whistleblower's allegations that Trump had requested investigations into the Bidens and invoked a conspiracy theory involving a Democratic National Committee server, while repeatedly urging Zelenskyy to work with Giuliani and Barr on these matters.

Democratic presidential candidate Sen. Elizabeth Warren described this sentence as a "smoking gun" suggesting a quid pro quo. Prominent Democrats, including Senators Robert Menendez and Chris Murphy, suggested that the hold may have been intended to implicitly or explicitly pressure the Ukrainian government to investigate Hunter Biden. Former Ukrainian presidential advisor Serhiy Leshchenko said it was made a "clear fact" that Ukraine's communication with the U.S. was dependent on discussing a future investigation into the Bidens, while another anonymous Ukrainian lawmaker said Trump attempted to "pressure" and "blackmail" them into accepting a "quid pro quo" agreement based upon cooperation.

==== Ukraine ====
Volodymyr Zelenskyy with Donald Trump in New York City on September 25, 2019

On September 20, 2019, Roman Truba, head of the Ukraine State Bureau of Investigations, told American news and opinion website The Daily Beast that his agency had not investigated the Biden–Burisma connection and there were no signs of illegality there. Anton Herashchenko, a senior advisor to the Ukraine interior minister, told The Daily Beast that Ukraine will open such an investigation if there is an official request, along with details of why an investigation is needed and what to look for; Trump's requests had come through unofficial representatives such as Giuliani.

Ukrainian foreign minister Vadym Prystaiko told a Ukrainian news outlet on September 21: "I know what the [phone] conversation was about and I think there was no pressure. This conversation was long, friendly, and it touched on many questions, sometimes requiring serious answers." Prystaiko was also quoted as saying: "I want to say that we are an independent state, we have our secrets." On September 22, Senator Murphy said President Zelenskyy told him he had no intention to get involved with an American election.

In an interview released on September 24, Ukrainian diplomat and politician Valentyn Nalyvaichenko told The Daily Beast that Ukrainian authorities would be reopening corruption investigations into multiple individuals and organizations including, potentially, Burisma, Trump campaign manager Paul Manafort, TV host Larry King, and former prosecutor Yuriy Lutsenko. King was suspected of having received slush fund payments recorded in the "black ledger" that also named Manafort. Nalyvaichenko accused Lutsenko of having been in communication with associates of Trump "for vindictive purposes".

Trump and Zelenskyy held a joint press conference at the United Nations the same day the transcript of their phone call was released. Zelenskyy told reporters: "We had, I think, good phone call. It was normal. We spoke about many things. So, I think, and you read it, that nobody pushed me." The next day, President Zelenskyy said President Trump had not pressured anyone nor made any promises, and that the Prosecutor General Ruslan Riaboshapka would investigate all domestic cases without prejudice. On September 30, Zelenskyy made it clear that he was not going to interfere with the intra-American party confrontation. Subsequently, at an all-day press conference on October 10, Zelenskyy said he had learned about the blockage of the military aid only after the July 25 phone call. "We didn't speak about this. There was no blackmail."

The New York Times reported on October 3 that Gordon Sondland, U.S. Ambassador to the European Union, and Kurt Volker, U.S. Special Envoy to Ukraine, had in August drafted a statement for Zelenskyy to sign that would commit Ukraine to investigate Burisma, the company that Hunter Biden worked for, as well as the conspiracy theory that Ukraine interfered with the 2016 election to benefit Hillary Clinton.

On September 22, shortly after the public had become aware of the existence of a whistleblower, Trump acknowledged that he had discussed Joe Biden during a call with Zelenskyy on July 25. Trump said, "The conversation I had was largely congratulatory, was largely corruption, all of the corruption taking place, was largely the fact that we don't want our people like Vice President Biden and his son contributing to [sic] the corruption already in Ukraine." Trump denied that his hold on military aid for Ukraine was linked to the Ukrainian government's refusal to investigate the Hunter Biden controversy, while also saying that withholding aid for this reason would have been ethically acceptable if he had done it. On September 26, 2019, Trump accused the person who provided the whistleblower with information of the call of being a "spy" and guilty of treason, before noting that treason is punishable by death. The whistleblower's lawyers said their client feared for his or her safety.

Two people close to Trump told The New York Times that the behavior in the scandal was "typical" of his "dealings on the phone with world leaders", e.g. engaging in flattery, discussing cooperation, and bringing up a personal favor which then could be delegated. In an interview, Giuliani defended Trump, calling the president's request of the Ukrainian president "perfectly appropriate", while also indicating that he himself may have made a similar request to Ukrainian officials. A second whistleblower, who is also an intelligence official, came forward on October 5 with "first-hand knowledge of allegations" associated with the phone call between Trump and Zelenskyy, according to the lawyer representing both whistleblowers.

==== Further revelations ====
President Trump states on October 3, 2019, that "China should start an investigation into the Bidens"

On September 27, 2019, the White House confirmed an allegation by the first whistleblower that a record of the call between Trump and Zelenskyy was sealed in a highly classified computer system at the advice of NSC lawyers. This came alongside media reports that the White House had used the most highly classified system to store memorandums of conversations with the leaders and officials of countries including Ukraine, Saudi Arabia and Russia. Administration officials had begun storing these transcripts into this system after Trump's conversations with Australia's prime minister Malcolm Turnbull and Mexico's president Enrique Peña Nieto leaked earlier in 2017. This was seen by critics and the media as a deliberate attempt to hide potentially damaging information.

On October 3, after saying the U.S. has "tremendous power" and "many options" in the trade war with China "if they don't do what we want", Trump was asked by a reporter on what he hoped Zelenskyy would do after his phone call. Trump responded by publicly urging both Ukraine and China to investigate the Bidens.

In an interview with The New Yorker on December 16, Rudy Giuliani said removing the U.S. ambassador to Ukraine became imperative for him and Trump. "I needed Yovanovitch out of the way," Giuliani told the magazine.

== House of Representatives investigations ==
Announcement by Nancy Pelosi of formal impeachment inquiry, September 24, 2019

On the evening of September 24, 2019, Pelosi announced that six committees of the House of Representatives would begin a formal impeachment inquiry into President Trump. Pelosi accused Trump of betraying his oath of office, U.S. national security, and the integrity of the country's elections. The six committees charged with the task are those on Financial Services, the Judiciary, Intelligence, Foreign Affairs, Oversight and Reform, and Ways and Means.

House of Representatives debate on the whistleblower complaint against President Trump on September 25, 2019

Maguire, who had delayed the whistleblower complaint from reaching Congress, testified publicly before the House Intelligence Committee on September 26. Maguire defended his decision not to immediately forward the whistleblower complaint to Congress and explained that he had consulted the White House Counsel and the Office of Legal Counsel at the Justice Department (DOJ), but was unable to determine whether the document was protected by executive privilege. Democrats on the committee questioned his actions, arguing that the law demands the forwarding of such complaints to the committee. Maguire countered that the situation was unique since the complaint involves communications of the president. Members of the House Intelligence Committee also asked Maguire why he chose to consult with White House lawyers when he was not required to do so by law, to which he responded that he believed "it would be prudent to have another opinion."

In a private conference call with Democratic lawmakers on September 29, Pelosi laid out how three of these House committees would begin investigating the President's alleged abuse of power. The House Intelligence Committee would focus on the contents of the whistleblower complaint and whether the complaint may have been wrongfully hidden from Congress, while the Foreign Affairs Committee would focus on interactions the State Department may have had with the president's personal attorney Giuliani, and the Oversight and Reform Committee would investigate whether White House classification systems were used to secure potentially damaging records of phone calls between the president and other world leaders.

=== Requests for evidence and White House refusal ===
Letter from White House Counsel to the House Speaker and committee chairs stating that the Trump administration will not participate in the House's "partisan and unconstitutional" inquiry

On September 27, 2019, a subpoena was issued by the House to obtain documents Secretary of State Mike Pompeo had refused to release earlier. Said documents include several interactions between Trump, Giuliani, and Ukrainian government officials. The documents were requested to be filed with the involved committees probing the issue; the failure to do so "shall constitute evidence of obstruction of the House's impeachment inquiry", as stated in a letter written to Pompeo. The subpoena came after several requests by the House to receive the documents from the Secretary which he did not fulfill. Several members of the House involved with the impeachment inquiry sent him subsequent letters stating that they will be meeting with members of the State Department who may provide further information. The following week, a subpoena was also issued to Giuliani for production of documents.

On October 4, 2019, the House Intelligence Committee issued subpoenas both to the White House and to Vice President Mike Pence for documents related to the whistleblower complaint. The White House documents requested include audio tapes, transcripts, notes, and other White House documents related to the whistleblower controversy.

On October 8, 2019, in a letter from White House Counsel Pat Cipollone to House Speaker Pelosi and the three committee chairmen conducting the impeachment investigation, the White House announced that it would not cooperate with the investigation. In the letter, Cipollone said the investigation "violates the Constitution, the rule of law, and every past precedent" and that "The President cannot allow your constitutionally illegitimate proceedings to distract him and those in the Executive Branch." The letter went on to say "[the investigation's] unprecedented actions have left the President with no choice. To fulfill his duties to the American people, the Constitution, the Executive Branch, and all future occupants of the Office of the Presidency, President Trump and his Administration cannot participate in your partisan and unconstitutional inquiry under these circumstances." House Speaker Pelosi responded to the letter saying "The White House should be warned that continued efforts to hide the truth of the president's abuse of power from the American people will be regarded as further evidence of obstruction." House Democrats have suggested that defiance of their investigation could provide evidence for a separate article of impeachment on obstruction. In past impeachment probes, Congress has treated an obstruction of DOJ and Congressional investigations as an article of impeachment, either along with other alleged offenses (Johnson, Nixon) or even as its sole basis for articles of impeachment (Clinton).

Giuliani's attorney, Jim A. Sale, sent a letter to the House Intelligence Committee on October 15, 2019, stating that Giuliani would not provide documents subpoenaed by the committee. Citing attorney–client and executive privilege, the letter characterized the subpoena as "beyond the scope of legitimate inquiry".

==== Subpoenas for documents ====
Name	Position	Deadline date	Status of compliance
Mike Pompeo	United States Secretary of State	October 4, 2019	Refused to provide documents
Gordon Sondland	United States Ambassador to the European Union	October 14, 2019	Testified but stated that he is not authorized to provide documents
Mike Pence	Vice President of the United States	October 15, 2019	Refused to provide documents
Rudy Giuliani	Personal attorney to President Trump	October 15, 2019	Refused to provide documents
Mark T. Esper	United States Secretary of Defense	October 15, 2019	Refused to provide documents
Mick Mulvaney	Acting White House Chief of Staff	October 18, 2019	Refused to provide documents
Rick Perry	United States Secretary of Energy	October 18, 2019	Refused to provide documents

==== Requests and subpoenas to appear ====
Name	Position	Deadline date	Status of compliance
Joseph Maguire	Acting Director of National Intelligence	—	Testified on September 26, before the House Intelligence Committee
Steve Linick	State Department Inspector General	—	Met with Congress on October 2, and shared conspiracy-theory documents Giuliani had previously sent to the FBI
Marie Yovanovitch	Former United States Ambassador to Ukraine	October 2, 2019	Deposed on October 11
Kurt Volker	Former U.S. Special Envoy to Ukraine	October 3, 2019	Deposed on October 3; returned for additional questioning on October 16
Michael Atkinson	Intelligence Community Inspector General	—	Deposed on October 4
George Kent	Deputy Assistant Secretary	October 7, 2019	Blocked from appearing on October 7; deposed on October 15
Lev Parnas	Businessman, associate of Rudy Giuliani	October 11, 2019	Arrested on October 9 at Dulles Airport and charged with alleged federal campaign finance-related crimes in New York
Igor Fruman	Businessman, associate of Rudy Giuliani	October 11, 2019	Arrested on October 9 at Dulles Airport and charged with alleged federal campaign finance-related crimes in New York
Fiona Hill	Former White House Russia adviser	—	Deposed on October 14
Semyon Kislin	Businessman, associate of Rudy Giuliani	October 14, 2019	Reached "an understanding" with committees and is cooperating, according to his attorney
Michael McKinley	Senior adviser to Secretary Pompeo	—	Deposed on October 16, 2019
Gordon Sondland	United States Ambassador to the European Union	October 16, 2019	First subpoenaed to appear by October 10; deposed on October 17
Bill Taylor	U.S. Chargé d'affaires to Ukraine	—	Deposed on October 22, 2019
Laura Cooper	Deputy Assistant Secretary of Defense	—	Was initially expected to appear on October 18, 2019; deposed on October 23
Philip T. Reeker	Acting Assistant Secretary of State for European and Eurasian Affairs	—	Deposed on October 26, 2019
Charles Kupperman	Former Deputy National Security Advisor	October 28, 2019	Was expected to appear on October 28, 2019; refused, pending court ruling; subpoena withdrawn on November 6
Alexander Vindman	National Security Council Director for European Affairs	—	Deposed on October 29, 2019
Catherine Croft	National Security Council staff	—	Deposed on October 30, 2019
Kathryn L. Wheelbarger	Acting Assistant Secretary of Defense for International Security Affairs	—	Was expected to appear on October 30, 2019
Tim Morrison	National Security Council Senior Director for Europe and Russia	—	Deposed on October 31, 2019
John Eisenberg	Deputy Counsel to the President for National Security Affairs	—	Subpoenaed on November 1 for appearance; refused to appear through counsel
Michael Duffey	Associate Director for National Security Programs	November 5, 2019	Did not appear voluntarily on October 23, 2019; given a subpoena on October 25, 2019
Ulrich Brechbuhl	Counselor of the State Department	November 6, 2019	Did not appear voluntarily on October 8, 2019; given a subpoena on October 25, 2019
Russell Vought	Acting Director of the Office of Management and Budget	November 6, 2019	Did not appear voluntarily on October 25, 2019; given a subpoena that day
David Hale	Under Secretary of State for Political Affairs	—	Deposed on November 6, 2019
Jennifer Williams	Foreign Service Officer	—	Deposed on November 7, 2019
David Holmes	Counselor for Political Affairs, Ukraine	—	Deposed on November 15, 2019
Mark Sandy	Office of Management and Budget Deputy Assoc. Director for National Security Programs	—	Deposed on November 16, 2019
John Bolton	Former National Security Advisor	—	Declined invitation to testify, and stated he would legally challenge any subpoena
Suriya Jayanti	Foreign Service Officer at U.S. Embassy Kyiv	October 25, 2019	Was expected to appear on October 25, 2019.

=== Depositions ===
Initial depositions were taken before the Intelligence, Foreign Affairs, and Oversight House committees, meeting jointly in a secure room, a Sensitive Compartmented Information Facility (SCIF) in the basement of the U.S. Capitol. Only members of the three committees (47 Republicans and 57 Democrats) were permitted to attend. Witnesses were questioned by staff lawyers, and committee members were allowed to ask questions, with equal time being given to Republicans and Democrats. Transcripts were expected to be released and public hearings to be held at some time in the future. Transcripts began to be released in early November, and public hearings were scheduled to begin on November 13.

On the morning of the Cipollone letter on October 8, 2019, Gordon Sondland had been scheduled to testify before the House committees regarding his involvement in the withholding of aid from Ukraine. However, he was instructed not to attend at the last minute by the State Department upon Trump's command.

==== Early depositions: October 11–17, 2019 ====
Ambassador Marie Yovanovitch's opening statement to her testimony before three House committees, October 11, 2019

Marie Yovanovitch, the former ambassador to Ukraine, testified on October 11, 2019, in defiance of the White House, although she remained an employee of the U.S. State Department until her voluntary retirement some months later. Yovanovitch told House committees she was "incredulous" at having been dismissed in May. She described the State Department as "attacked and hollowed out from within". Yovanovitch testified that she had never met or spoken with Hunter Biden and that Joe Biden had never raised the subject of his son or the Ukrainian gas firm that employed him. During his July 25 phone call with Zelenskyy, Trump called Yovanovitch "bad news" and mentioned that "[s]he's going to go through some things".

A former adviser to the president on Russian affairs, Fiona Hill, testified before congressional investigators on October 14, 2019. She told the House committees that Giuliani circumvented State Department officials and diplomats, and that she had confronted Ambassador Sondland, who was assisting Giuliani in his efforts to pressure Ukraine into beginning investigations that would personally benefit Trump. After a meeting in which Sondland announced that there were "[Ukrainian] investigations that were dropped [and] need to be started up again" and under instruction from John Bolton (the National Security Advisor from April 2018 to September 2019), Hill expressed her and Bolton's concerns about Giuliani's activities to John Eisenberg, an attorney for the NSC. Hill testified that she, Bolton, Volker, Energy Secretary Rick Perry, and two Ukrainian officials, were at that meeting on July 10, 2019, and that Bolton was furious after the meeting when he told her he was "not part of whatever drug deal Sondland and Mulvaney are cooking up". Hill told the committees that Giuliani was running a rogue foreign policy while informing the president's official advisers but leaving them powerless to stop it. When she confronted Sondland, who she believed was involved in affairs outside his position's purview, he claimed that, according to Trump, he was in charge of Ukraine matters.

George Kent, Deputy Assistant Secretary for European and Eurasian Affairs, appeared before the Intelligence, Foreign Affairs and Oversight House committees on October 15, 2019. Kent is the second current State Department official to defy White House instructions and comply with House subpoenas to testify before the committees. According to Representative Gerry Connolly (D-Virginia), Kent testified that, during a meeting at the White House on May 23 organized by Mulvaney, Sondland, Volker, and Perry, who called themselves the "three amigos", had declared that they were now responsible for Ukrainian affairs. Connolly also said Kent testified that he had been directed to "lay low" and to focus on foreign relations with the five other countries in his purview.

Ambassador Gordon Sondland's opening statement to his testimony before three House committees, October 17, 2019

A former senior adviser to Secretary Pompeo, Michael McKinley, testified on October 16, 2019, after having resigned from his position the previous week. McKinley testified that he had resigned from his position out of frustration with the Trump administration and the recall of Ambassador Yovanovitch was the "last straw". In his opening remarks, he said "[t]he timing of my resignation was the result of two overriding concerns: the failure, in my view, of the State Department to offer support to Foreign Service employees caught up in the impeachment inquiry on Ukraine and, second, by what appears to be the utilization of our ambassadors overseas to advance a domestic political objective." McKinley said he was "disturbed by the implication that foreign governments were being approached to procure negative information on political opponents".

Before appearing in front of three House committees on October 17, 2019, Ambassador Sondland publicly released his opening remarks. He testified that Trump had refused to meet with the Ukrainian president without preconditions and that, in a May 23 meeting, State Department officials were directed to work with Giuliani to address Trump's "concerns" about the Ukrainian government. Sondland claimed he was ignorant of Giuliani's intentions and had no choice but to work with the president's personal attorney. According to The New York Times, this conflicts with previous testimony given during the inquiry in which other State Department officials testified that Sondland was "a willing participant who inserted himself into Ukraine policy even though the country is not in the purview of his posting, and was a key player in [Trump]'s efforts to win a commitment from the new Ukrainian government to investigate his political rivals." The Washington Post also disputes this claim, asserting that it conflicts with the known timeline of events. According to The Washington Post, "In the weeks leading up to that May 23 White House briefing, Giuliani's and even Trump's interest in spotlighting the Bidens' actions in Ukraine were hardly a secret."

==== Bill Taylor ====
Ambassador Bill Taylor's opening statement to his testimony before three House committees, October 22, 2019

On October 22, 2019, Bill Taylor, the senior U.S. diplomatic official in Ukraine, testified to Congressional investigators. Taylor testified that he had learned in mid-July 2019 that a potential White House meeting between Trump and Zelenskyy "was conditioned on the investigations of Burisma and alleged Ukrainian interference in the 2016 U.S. elections", and that he later was told, in September 2019, that U.S. military aid to Ukraine was also dependent on such investigations—including into the Bidens.

Taylor testified that, alongside the "regular, formal diplomatic processes" with Ukraine led by himself, there was a "highly irregular", "informal channel of U.S. policy-making" concerning Ukraine. The informal channel began in May 2019, being "guided" by Giuliani, and also involving Volker, Sondland and Perry. Taylor said that by August 2019 he had realized the informal channel "was running contrary to the goals of longstanding U.S. policy", while the formal channel wanted "a strong U.S.–Ukraine partnership". According to Taylor, the informal channel had "driven" the idea of a White House meeting between the presidents being conditional on the investigations.

Taylor noted that, during a June 2019 call between himself, Zelenskyy, Sondland, Volker and Perry; Sondland had said "he did not wish to include most of the regular interagency participants" and that "he wanted to make sure no one was transcribing or monitoring." As for Trump's July 2019 call with Zelenskyy, Taylor said he did not receive any report regarding the call from the White House even though he was scheduled to meet Zelenskyy a day later.

Taylor said he heard from NSC aide Tim Morrison that, on September 1, Sondland told Zelenskyy aide Andriy Yermak that the military aid to Ukraine was dependent on Zelenskyy's pursuit of the Burisma investigation. Taylor cited Sondland's telling him in a call that Trump wanted Zelenskyy to publicly announce he would order the two investigations, thus placing Zelenskyy "in a public box". Taylor quoted Sondland as saying "everything" including military aid and a Trump–Zelenskyy meeting was contingent upon that announcement.

According to Taylor, he wrote a first-person cable to Secretary Pompeo on advice from Bolton: "I wrote and transmitted such a cable on August 29, describing the 'folly' I saw in withholding military aid to Ukraine at a time when hostilities were still active in the east and when Russia was watching closely to gauge the level of American support for the Ukrainian government. I told the secretary that I could not and would not defend such a policy." Taylor reported that Pompeo gave no reply to his cable.

==== Republican protest and legal challenges ====
On October 23, 2019, Laura Cooper, the Deputy Assistant Secretary of Defense for Russia, Ukraine, and Eurasia, testified in closed session before three Congressional committees. Cooper's testimony, originally scheduled for that morning, was delayed by roughly five hours when a group of House Republicans led by Matt Gaetz (R-Florida) stormed the SCIF where impeachment inquiry committee meetings are being held, and refused to leave, at one point ordering pizza. The group protested what they asserted were secret Democratic hearings closed to Republicans, although 48 Republicans who are members of the three committees jointly holding the hearings were entitled to attend the hearings and some had done so. Thirteen of those members participated in the protest. Democrats responded with criticism over the interruption and accused the Republicans of violating the rules governing the SCIF, which prohibit cell phones in the area. After the protest ended, Cooper completed her testimony which lasted approximately 3.5 hours. She was expected to speak about how the process works for transferring military aid to Ukraine. She is believed to have tried to get the aid released. The next day it was revealed that her attorney had received a letter from the Pentagon telling her not to testify, citing an administration-wide policy against cooperating with the probe.

The House Judiciary Committee asked to see secret grand jury information that had been used in compiling the Mueller Report. The DOJ refused to turn it over, arguing that secrecy of grand jury material must be preserved and that the impeachment inquiry was invalid. On October 25, 2019, Federal Judge Beryl A. Howell ruled that the inquiry is valid and that the DOJ must forward the information to the committee within the week. DOJ attorneys had previously asserted that congressional investigators had "not yet exhausted [their] available discovery tools", arguments Howell said "smack of farce", as the administration had openly said it would stonewall the investigation. Some legal analysts noted that a White House counsel letter to Democratic leaders days earlier stating the administration would not cooperate with the impeachment inquiry—which was widely derided as more of a political rather than a legal argument— may have backfired by contributing to Howell's rationale for her decision.

Charles Kupperman, Trump's deputy national security advisor from January to September 2019, filed a lawsuit on October 25, 2019, in which he asked a federal judge to rule which conflicting order he should follow: a subpoena from the House or an order from the White House not to appear. His attorney said that as a private citizen Kupperman is not able to choose which directive to obey, adding that "Constitutional disputes between the Legislative and Executive Branches should be adjudicated by the Judicial Branch". Hearings on the case were scheduled for December 2019. The subpoena was withdrawn on November 6, but the judge indicated the case will go on.

==== Alexander Vindman ====
Alexander Vindman's opening statement to his testimony before three House committees, October 29, 2019

On October 29, 2019, the NSC's head of European Affairs, Lieutenant Colonel Alexander Vindman, testified before the House committees, stating he had overheard Trump's phone conversation with the Ukrainian President. He had released his opening statement the day before. Vindman testified: "In Spring of 2019, I became aware of outside influencers promoting a false and alternative narrative of Ukraine inconsistent with the consensus views of the interagency, [which was] harmful to U.S. national security [and also] undermined U.S. government efforts to expand cooperation with Ukraine."

Vindman said that, additionally, he was concerned by two events, both of which he objected to senior officials in real-time, and which he reported to the NSC's lead attorney. The first event occurred at a July 10 meeting between Ukraine's then Secretary of National Security and Defense Council Oleksandr Danlylyuk, and then U.S. National Security Advisor Bolton, at which Ambassadors Volker and Sondland, and Secretary Perry were in attendance. At the meeting, Sondland asked Ukraine to launch investigations into the Bidens to get a meeting with President Trump. Vindman states that Bolton cut the meeting short, and that both he and Fiona Hill told Ambassador Sondland his comments were inappropriate, and that he reported the concerns to the NSC's lead counsel.

The second event occurred on a July 25 phone call between President Trump and Zelenskyy. Vindman states, "I was concerned by the call. I did not think it was proper to demand that a foreign government investigate a U.S. citizen, and I was worried about the implications for the U.S. government's support of Ukraine. I realized that if Ukraine pursued an investigation into the Bidens and Burisma, it would likely be interpreted as a partisan play which would undoubtedly result in Ukraine losing the bipartisan support it has thus far maintained. This would all undermine U.S. national security." Vindman also reported this event to Eisenberg, the NSC's lead counsel. Vindman also testified that the "rough transcript" of the call released by the White House omitted crucial words and phrases, including Trump asserting recordings of Joe Biden discussing Ukraine corruption exist, which Trump stated in the third set of ellipses in the released transcript. Vindman said he had tried but failed to restore the full transcript. A senior White House official had asserted when the transcript was released that the ellipses "do not indicate missing words or phrases", but rather "a trailing off of a voice or pause". Trump had previously characterized the released transcript as "an exact word-for-word transcript of the conversation".

Vindman also testified that the "rough transcript" of the July 25 phone call omitted President Zelenskyy stating the name Burisma (the natural gas company on whose board Hunter Biden sat), and substituted it with the phrase "the company that you mentioned in this issue".

==== October 30–31, 2019 ====
On October 30, 2019, Catherine Croft, a State Department Ukraine expert and NSC staff member testified. She noted in her opening statement that she was aware of Giuliani's communication with Volker, though she was not involved with those discussions, that former Republican lawmaker Bob Livingston repeatedly called her to promote the removal of Ambassador Yovanovitch. She added: "On July 18, I participated in a sub-Policy Coordination Committee video conference where an [Office of Management and Budget (OMB)] representative reported that the White House Chief of Staff, Mick Mulvaney, had placed an informal hold on security assistance to Ukraine. The only reason given was that the order came in the direction of the President."

Christopher J. Anderson, a career Foreign Service officer who succeeded Croft as an adviser to Volker, was also deposed the same day. In his opening statement, Anderson said he and Volker had attempted to satisfy Giuliani while at same time assisting the Ukrainian government to fight corruption and build a relationship with the U.S. However, their efforts repeatedly conflicted with Giuliani's. Anderson confirmed that Bolton had concerns with Giuliani's involvement in Ukraine affairs, and that he had written a memo summarizing Bolton's concerns to share with other State Department officials including Kent. Anderson also noted that he and several other State Department officials prepared a statement condemning the Russian military intervention in Ukraine after the 2018 attack on Ukrainian vessels in the Sea of Azov. However, the statement was blocked from publication by the White House.

Tim Morrison, an official on the NSC, testified in a closed-door session on October 31. Morrison corroborated previous testimony by Bill Taylor, saying Taylor had been "accurate" on the "substance" of their conversations, but there were two differences in the details, the first being a location of a meeting. Regarding the second difference, Morrison testified that in his September 1 conversation with Sondland, he learned that Sondland had proposed to Ukrainian presidential advisor Andriy Yermak that military aid to Ukraine was "conditioned on a public statement" by the new Ukrainian prosecutor general's reopening an investigation into Burisma. (Taylor's testimony was that Zelenskyy should make the announcement.) Morrison also discussed the July 2019 Trump–Zelenskyy call, having listened to the call himself. He told lawmakers he "promptly" brought concerns about the call to White House lawyers because he worried a summary would be leaked with negative consequences, but he said he did not necessarily think anything illegal was discussed.

==== White House officials refuse to be deposed ====
Democrats had hoped to hear from four current White House officials on November 4, including John Eisenberg, deputy counsel to the president for National Security Affairs; Michael Ellis, senior associate counsel to the president; Robert Blair, a top aide to the chief of staff; and Brian McCormack, an official with the Office of Management and Budget (OMB). Like former deputy national security adviser Charles Kupperman, Blair is waiting for the courts to solve a conflict between the White House prohibition and a congressional subpoena. The case is scheduled to be decided in December; the same month, Blair was promoted.

Michael Duffey, OMB's associate director for National Security Programs, and acting OMB Director Russell Vought, did not appear for scheduled closed-door depositions on November 5 and 6, respectively. Ulrich Brechbuhl, Counselor of the State Department, defied the subpoena for November 6 and traveled to Europe with Pompeo instead. Bolton said he would not voluntarily testify on November 7, and was expected to legally challenge a subpoena, and threatened to sue if committees issued a subpoena. House investigators subsequently withdrew the subpoena.

==== November 6–8, 2019 ====
On November 6, 2019, David Hale, the undersecretary of State for political affairs, testified for several hours on the subject of the ouster of Yovanovitch. Jennifer Williams, a special advisor to United States Vice President Mike Pence on European and Russian affairs, who happened to be listening in on the July 25 call, testified on November 7, 2019.

==== November 15–16, 2019 ====
David Holmes's opening statement to his deposition on November 15, 2019

On November 15, David Holmes, a U.S. Department of State foreign service officer who works at the U.S. embassy in Ukraine, and serves as an aide to Bill Taylor, testified in a closed-door session before three House committees that he and two unnamed aides overheard a phone conversation between Ambassador Sondland and President Trump, while at a restaurant in Kyiv, and immediately following a private meeting between President Zelenskyy and Sondland, where Trump asked Sondland about whether or not the Ukrainian President had agreed to investigate the Bidens. Holmes' statement provided the first testimony under oath that Trump directly and contemporaneously requested investigations of Joe and Hunter Biden and Burisma, with Trump allegedly asking "so he's gonna do the investigation?", refuting the potential defense that Trump had not been involved, and that Sondland might have been acting without the president's knowledge. Further, Holmes' deposition raised questions about the credibility, accuracy, and truthfulness of Ambassador Sondland's previous sworn deposition, furthering the possibility that Sondland either perjured himself or needed to clarify his original sworn statement. Third, Holmes' statement provided the first characterization of the actual language and degree of Trump's interest in having Ukraine investigate the Bidens, with Sondland saying to Trump about Zelenskyy that "he loves your ass" and "will do anything you ask him to", and Sondland later telling Holmes that President Trump "doesn't give a shit about Ukraine" and "only cares about the big stuff"—namely, investigations into the Bidens.

The phone call being made in a public restaurant in Kyiv on unencrypted cell phones with Russian intelligence agents potentially listening to the conversation raised security concerns to some former diplomats and military officials. The circumstances of the call, along with later subpoenaed phone records included in the House Intelligence Committee's impeachment inquiry report, which also appeared to be unencrypted, led John Sipher, former deputy chief of Russia operations for the CIA, to comment to the Washington Post that Trump and Giuliani have effectively "given the Russians ammunition they can use in an overt fashion, a covert fashion or in the twisting of information". He continued "Congress and investigators have call records that suggest certain things but have no means whatsoever of getting the actual text [of what was said]. I guarantee the Russians have the actual information."

On November 16, OMB official Mark Sandy was deposed. In his deposition, Sandy acknowledged that Trump did enact an unusual freeze in aid to Ukraine. Sandy testified that two OMB employees had recently resigned while expressing concerns about the Impoundment Control Act hold on aid to Ukraine.

=== Resolution to begin public hearings ===
On October 29, 2019, Representative Jim McGovern (D-Massachusetts) introduced a resolution (H. Res. 660), referred to House Rules Committee, which set forth the "format of open hearings in the House Intelligence Committee, including staff-led questioning of witnesses, and [authorization for] the public release of deposition transcripts". It also proposed the procedures for the transfer of evidence to House Judiciary Committee as it considers articles of impeachment. The resolution was debated in Rules Committee the next day and brought to a floor vote on October 31. It was adopted with a vote of 232 to 196, with two Democrats and all Republicans voting against the measure.

=== Release of deposition transcripts ===
Transcript of the deposition of Marie Yovanovitch on October 11, 2019, released on November 4, along with excerpts

Transcript of the interview of Michael McKinley on October 16, 2019, released on November 4, 2019, along with excerpts

Transcript of the interview of Gordon Sondland on October 17, 2019, released on November 5, along with an addendum added the previous day and excerpts

Transcript of the interview of Kurt Volker on October 3, 2019, released on November 5, along with excerpts

Transcript of the deposition of Bill Taylor on October 22, 2019, released on November 6, along with excerpts

Transcript of the interview of George Kent on October 15, 2019, released on November 7, along with excerpts

On November 4, 2019, two transcripts of the closed-door depositions, those of Ambassadors Yovanovitch and McKinley, were released by the three presiding House committees. The transcripts revealed that Yovanovitch first learned, from Ukrainian officials in November or December 2018, of a campaign by Giuliani and Lutsenko to remove her from her post. Yovanovitch also testified that the U.S. embassy in Ukraine denied a visa application from the former Ukrainian prosecutor Viktor Shokin "to visit family" in the U.S. Although the application was simply denied because of his corrupt dealings in Ukraine, the ambassador later learned he had lied on his application and that the true purpose of the visit was to meet with Giuliani and "provide information about corruption at the embassy, including my [alleged] corruption", she told the committees. Giuliani lobbied the assistant secretary for consular affairs, conceding the true purpose of Shokin's planned visit to the U.S. The State Department meanwhile remained silent while she faced public attacks in an attempt to recall her to the U.S. Yovanovitch had been told by Sondland that showing support for the U.S. president may help prevent her dismissal but she chose not to heed the advice.

McKinley, a former ambassador and later senior adviser to Secretary Pompeo, testified that he had three times advised the Secretary of State to defend Yovanovitch after the July 25 call in which Trump disparaged her became public knowledge. McKinley also said Kent was being pressured by State Department lawyers to remain silent and that Kent feared the State Department was relaying inaccurate information to Congress. McKinley told the committees: "To see the emerging information on the engagement of our missions to procure negative political information for domestic purposes, combined with the failure I saw in the [State Department] to provide support for our professional cadre in a particularly trying time, I think the combination was a pretty good reason to decide enough, that I had no longer a useful role to play."

Transcripts of the depositions of Ambassadors Volker and Sondland were released on November 5, 2019. The transcript of Sondland's deposition on October 17 included an addendum filed by the ambassador on November 4. In the addendum, he said he had "refreshed [his] recollection" having now reviewed the testimonies of Taylor and Morrison which contradicted his original testimony. Sondland had originally claimed he "never" believed there were any preconditions for the release of military aid to Ukraine and that he "was dismayed when it was held up", but "didn't know why". In his new four-page sworn statement published along with the transcripts, Sondland confirmed that he had told President Zelenskyy's aide, Yermak, during a meeting on September 1, that the release of aid was predicated on the Ukrainian president's committing to an investigation of Burisma.

The transcript of Ambassador Taylor's deposition was also released on November 6. During his deposition on October 22, he described the campaign, led by Giuliani, to instigate investigations into the Bidens in Ukraine. Taylor said it was his "clear understanding, security assistance money would not come until the [Ukrainian] president committed to pursue the investigation". The following day saw the release of Kent's testimony transcripts in which he said, "[President Trump] wanted nothing less than President Zelensky to go to a microphone and say investigations, Biden and Clinton".

Following public release of the transcripts, Trump asserted they had been "doctored" by Schiff and encouraged Republicans to "put out their own transcripts!"

== Related judicial proceedings ==
=== Kupperman v. House of Representatives ===
On October 25, 2019, Charles Kupperman, Trump's former deputy national security adviser, filed an advisory lawsuit, asking a D.C. federal judge to rule on whether he is lawfully obliged to comply with a subpoena he received from the House of Representatives. He said he will follow whatever the judge says. He was scheduled to testify on October 28 but did not appear. On October 31, Judge Richard J. Leon scheduled a hearing for December 10. On November 6, the House joint investigating committees dropped their subpoena of Kupperman, asking that the parties abide by the ruling in a similar lawsuit pending against Don McGahn. Judge Leon indicated that the suit will go on anyway.

On November 9, former national security advisor John Bolton, who had joined in the Kupperman lawsuit, had his lawyer send a proffer to the committees, saying he could supply much additional pertinent information the committee did not have. White House acting chief of staff Mick Mulvaney also attempted to join in the Kupperman lawsuit. On November 11, Bolton's attorney filed a motion to block Mulvaney from joining the suit, arguing that Mulvaney had effectively waived immunity by acknowledging a quid pro quo in the Ukraine matter during an October 17 press briefing. Kupperman also objected to Mulvaney's participation and the judge said he was inclined not to allow it, whereupon Mulvaney withdrew his request.

There were oral arguments on December 10, and the case was dismissed on December 30, 2019.

=== In re: Don McGahn ===
D.C. District Court ruling ordering Don McGahn to follow a Congressional subpoena to appear before the House Judiciary Committee

U.S. District Court Judge Ketanji Brown Jackson presided over a case to decide whether or not the House Judiciary Committee can enforce a subpoena against former White House counsel Don McGahn. The House Judiciary Committee wanted his testimony on matters related to Robert Mueller's report that certain actions could constitute obstruction of justice. The Justice Department had claimed "absolute immunity". On November 25 she ruled that he must testify, declaring that "no one is above the law," but that he could invoke executive privilege on certain questions. Jackson's ruling said that the Justice Department's claim to "unreviewable absolute testimonial immunity" is "baseless, and as such, cannot be sustained".

Excerpts from the ruling include:

- "When DOJ insists that presidents can lawfully prevent their senior-level aides from responding to compelled congressional process and that neither the federal courts nor Congress has the power to do anything about it, DOJ promotes a conception of separation-of-powers principles that gets these constitutional commands exactly backwards. In reality, it is a core tenet of this Nation's founding that the powers of a monarch must be split between the branches of the government to prevent tyranny."
- "Stated simply, the primary takeaway from the past 250 years of recorded American history is that presidents are not kings. See The Federalist No. 51 (James Madison); The Federalist No. 69 (Alexander Hamilton); 1 Alexis de Tocqueville, Democracy in America 115–18 (Harvey C. Mansfield & Delba Winthrop eds. & trans., Univ. of Chicago Press 2000) (1835)."
- "In this land of liberty, it is indisputable that current and former employees of the White House work for the People of the United States, and that they take an oath to protect and defend the Constitution of the United States."
- "To be sure, there may well be circumstances in which certain aides of the President possess confidential, classified, or privileged information that cannot be divulged in the national interest and that such aides may be bound by statute or executive order to protect. But, in this Court's view, the withholding of such information from the public square in the national interest and at the behest of the President is a duty that the aide herself possesses."
- "DOJ's present assertion that the absolute testimonial immunity that senior-level presidential aides possess is, ultimately, owned by the President, and can be invoked by the President to overcome the aides' own will to testify, is a proposition that cannot be squared with core constitutional values, and for this reason alone, it cannot be sustained."
- The United States of America has a government of laws and not of men.

The administration has appealed the ruling. Reacting on Twitter, McGahn attorney William Burck said McGahn will comply unless the order is stayed pending appeal, and on November 26 the Department of Justice asked Jackson to put a temporary stay on her order so they can appeal it. A one-week stay was granted, and when the lawyers asked for a second stay on December 2, it was denied.

=== Request for Grand Jury materials ===
House Democrats have requested the records from the grand jury proceedings that were part of the Mueller investigation, stating that the material was needed to investigate whether or not articles of impeachment should include perjury charges against the president based on his responses to the Mueller probe. The district court decided in their favor, but two of the three judges on an appeals court panel seemed skeptical. They set oral arguments for January 3, 2020. On March 10, 2020, the panel ruled 2–1 in favor of releasing the material to Congress.

On January 3, lawyers for the House Judiciary Committee urged the court to enforce the subpoena against McGahn, arguing that McGahn's testimony could provide the basis for new articles of impeachment against the President. When Trump-appointed judges asked what might happen if the courts demurred, Letter raised the specter of chaos and civil war, raising the prospect of a pitched gun battle between the Sergeant at arms and the attorney general's security detail.

=== Other proceedings ===
On November 22, the State Department released 100 pages of documents in response to a court order. The documents show that Giuliani and Pompeo spoke on the phone twice in late March, confirming a statement made by David Hale in his public testimony. They also show that Trump's then-assistant Madeleine Westerhout helped to put Giuliani in touch with Pompeo. Pompeo also spoke with Devin Nunes a few days later. Early the next month, six former Ukraine ambassadors wrote a letter to Pompeo objecting to "recent uncorroborated allegations" against then-ambassador Marie Yovanovitch, saying "these charges are simply wrong."

Other FOIA requests have been made in related cases.

== House Intelligence Committee hearings ==
Schedule of public testimony
Date (EST)	Witness(es)
November 13	William Taylor; George Kent
November 15	Marie Yovanovitch
November 19	Morning: Jennifer Williams; Alexander Vindman; Afternoon: Kurt Volker; Tim Morrison
November 20	Morning: Gordon Sondland; Afternoon: Laura Cooper; David Hale
November 21	Fiona Hill; David Holmes

On November 6, 2019, Chairman Adam Schiff announced that the first public hearings of the impeachment inquiry would be held on November 13, beginning with Bill Taylor and George Kent. The announcement added that Marie Yovanovitch would testify in the second public hearing on November 15. The White House appointed new aides, including Pam Bondi and Tony Sayegh, to work on communications during the inquiry. House Republicans assigned Representative Jim Jordan (R-Ohio) to the House Intelligence Committee to participate in the hearings. Jordan replaced Representative Rick Crawford (R-Arkansas), who stepped down so Jordan could take his place.

Per the House of Representatives resolution adopted in October 2019, Republican representatives can subpoena witnesses only with the concurrence of the Democratic committee chairman or with approval of the majority members. The House Intelligence Committee ranking member, Representative Devin Nunes (R-California), in a November 9 letter, provided a list of eight witnesses from whom the minority party wished to hear, including Hunter Biden. In Schiff's decline of the request to hear from Biden, he said he would not allow Republicans to use the hearings to conduct "sham investigations". Schiff also rejected Nunes's request to question the anonymous whistleblower, for the individual's safety and because subsequent evidence "not only confirms but far exceeds" the whistleblower's complaint, so "the whistleblower's testimony is therefore redundant and unnecessary".

As public hearings approached, a staff memo to Republican members of the three relevant committees outlined the major themes they should pursue in Trump's defense. This includes focusing on the July 25 call summary which they allege "shows no conditionality or evidence of pressure" and that both Presidents Trump and Zelenskyy have said there was no pressure. The memo contended that any concerns Zelenskyy may have had about negative consequences of publicly acknowledging he felt pressure from Trump were unwarranted. The memo also claims that the "Ukrainian government was not aware of a hold on U.S. security assistance" before the July 25 call. It also points out that "President Trump met with President Zelensky and U.S. security assistance flowed to Ukraine in September 2019—both of which occurred without Ukraine investigating President Trump's political rivals."

The release of the Ukraine aid came two days after the House Intelligence Committee was notified of the whistleblower complaint and opened an investigation, and two days after three House committees publicly announced an investigation into Giuliani's activities in Ukraine.

As hearings began, Schiff said Trump may have committed bribery, and House Speaker Pelosi joined him on November 14; bribery is specifically listed as an impeachable offense in the Constitution.

=== November 13, 2019: Kent and Taylor ===
With live coverage on television, public hearings began at 10:00 a.m. EST on November 13, 2019, in which George Kent and William Taylor testified before the House Intelligence Committee. After opening statements from Chairman Schiff and ranking member Representative Nunes, Taylor and Kent read their openings statements. This was followed by questions from the chairman and the majority counsel, Dan Goldman, and then by the Ranking Member and the minority counsel, Steve Castor.

Taylor testified that the day after the Trump–Zelenskyy phone call, one of his aides, David Holmes, overheard Sondland speaking to Trump via cellphone in a Kyiv restaurant, hearing the president refer to "the investigations". Another diplomat, Suriya Jayanti, also overheard the call. Holmes testified behind closed doors on November 15 that he heard Trump ask, "so, he's gonna do the investigation?" to which Sondland replied, "he's gonna do it", adding that Zelenskyy would do "anything you ask him to". Holmes also testified that Sondland later told him that Trump "did not give a shit about Ukraine" and "only cared about the big stuff ... that benefits the president like the Biden investigation that Mr. Giuliani was pushing."

Analysts noted that the Sondland call itself constituted a major security breach, as it could have been intercepted by foreign intelligence services.

According to data from Nielsen, the first day of hearings had 13,098,000 viewers tuning in on various cable and broadcast channels (not including PBS, C-SPAN, and online streaming).

=== November 15, 2019: Yovanovitch ===
Marie Yovanovitch's testimony began at 9:00 a.m. EST and lasted six hours. She directly contradicted the Republican theory that Ukraine had tried to undermine Trump in the 2016 elections. She said she had three contacts with Giuliani, not involving the current allegations, and did not know why he chose to attack and discredit her. She said his allegations against her were false and that no one in the State Department believed them. She added that she was "shocked and devastated" when Trump disparaged her and said she was "going to go through some things" during his telephone call with Zelenskyy.

During her testimony, Trump berated her on Twitter, questioning her competence and saying the Ukrainian president had spoken unfavourably about her. Chairman Schiff informed Yovanovitch of the tweet during the hearing; she said it was "very intimidating". Trump's behavior was labelled as witness intimidation by Democrats. Eric Swalwell, who participated in questioning Yovanovitch during the hearing, said this could be laid out as a separate article of impeachment: "it's evidence of more obstruction".

=== November 19, 2019 ===
==== Vindman and Williams ====
Lieutenant Colonel Alexander Vindman testified in person before the U.S. House of Representatives. In his testimony, Vindman said he had made a report to an intelligence official about what he heard during Trump's call with the Ukrainian President and felt what the President mentioned during the phone conversation was "improper". Testifying alongside Vindman was Vice President Mike Pence's chief European security adviser Jennifer Williams. Williams testified that when Zelenskyy was elected, Pence initially agreed to attend the inauguration if his schedule permitted, but that plan was cancelled when on May 13, Williams was informed that President Trump had decided Pence would not represent the U.S. at the inauguration in Ukraine after all. Williams testified that she listened to Trump's phone conversation with Zelenskyy and felt it was "unusual". Both Vindman and Williams acknowledged the Trump administration's interest in obtaining knowledge of the Burisma controversy as well.

In questioning Vindman, Devin Nunes repeatedly demanded that he name all individuals to whom he had spoken. In a heated exchange, Vindman refused, and Schiff rebuked Nunes for trying to violate federally protected anonymity.

==== Volker and Morrison ====
At the request of Republicans, former U.S. Special Representative for Ukraine Kurt Volker and former National Security presidential adviser on Europe and Russia Tim Morrison gave public testimony before the House Intelligence Committee. In his testimony, Volker recanted his deposition denial of seeing no indication that Trump had conditioned a White House meeting and military assistance for Ukraine on a promise from the country's president to investigate Trump's political rivals. Asked why he recanted, Volker said "I have learned many things" since the previous closed-door hearing on October 3, 2019. During his testimony, Morrison said Sondland confirmed to him that there was indeed a quid pro quo for U.S. aid to Ukraine and that Sondland told him this following the September 1 telephone conversation with Yermak.

=== November 20, 2019 ===
==== Sondland ====
Ambassador to the European Union Gordon Sondland testified that he conducted his work with Giuliani at the "express direction of the president", and that he understood a potential White House invitation for Zelenskyy to be contingent on Ukraine announcing investigations into the 2016 elections and Burisma. Sondland made clear that he believed Giuliani was leading a quid pro quo scheme to pressure Ukraine on the president's behalf. He said he personally informed Zelenskyy, before the July 25 phone call, that Zelenskyy would need to assure Trump he planned a thorough investigation. He additionally stated that everyone in the administration "was in the loop", specifically naming John Bolton, Mike Pompeo, Ulrich Brechbuhl and Mike Pence, saying "they knew what they were doing and why." Sondland also said Trump had never directly told him that the aid package to Ukraine was related to the announcement of investigations, but that Sondland nevertheless believed it was.

Hours after Sondland's testimony, Pence's Chief of Staff Marc Short issued a statement denying Sondland's claim that Pence and Sondland discussed the alleged quid pro quo. The denial stated the vice president "never had a conversation with Gordon Sondland about investigating the Bidens, Burisma, or the conditional release of financial aid to Ukraine based upon potential investigations".

==== Cooper and Hale ====
Laura Cooper, the deputy assistant secretary of defense for Russia, Ukraine, and Eurasia, testified that Ukrainian officials knew about the hold on military aid by July 25, the day of the Trump–Zelenskyy call, undercutting an assertion that there could not have been a quid pro quo because Ukraine was not aware of the hold. David Hale, who serves as the United States Under Secretary of State for Political Affairs, testified that he found out from an OMB official that aid to Ukraine was being withheld at the direction of Trump.

Late in the day, Trump praised the performance of Republicans during the hearings, declaring, "not only did we win today, it's over."

=== November 21, 2019: Hill and Holmes ===
Fiona Hill—who until August 2019 was the top Russia expert on the NSC—criticized Republicans for promulgating the "fictional narrative" that Ukraine rather than Russia interfered in the 2016 election, asserting the theory was planted by Russia and played into its hands. Testifying alongside Hill was the current head of political affairs in the U.S. Embassy in Ukraine, David Holmes, who said he was concerned about Giuliani's role in a campaign which involved attacking the ambassador to Ukraine, Marie Yovanovitch, as well as a push for Ukraine to investigate interference in the 2016 presidential election and the Bidens, and described Sondland, Volker and U.S. Energy Secretary Rick Perry as "The Three Amigos" who ran the Ukraine campaign with Trump and Giuliani.

== Final report ==
"The Trump–Ukraine Impeachment Inquiry Report" released on December 3, 2019

Republican counter-report: "Report of Evidence In the Democrats' Impeachment Inquiry in the House of Representatives" released on December 2, 2019

On November 25, 2019, House Intelligence Committee Chairman Adam Schiff published a letter stating that next steps towards impeachment will be taken when a committee report regarding the impeachment inquiry will be sent to the House Judiciary Committee when Congress returns from its Thanksgiving recess.

A draft report was circulated among the membership of the House Intelligence Committee on December 2; the next day, it was released to the public. A markup committee meeting took place, followed by a formal vote on its final text, and a vote on whether or not to send it to the Judiciary Committee. On December 3, the House Intelligence Committee voted 13–9 along party lines to adopt the report and also send it to the House Judiciary Committee.

The report's preface states:

[T]he impeachment inquiry has found that President Trump, personally and acting through agents within and outside of the U.S. government, solicited the interference of a foreign government, Ukraine, to benefit his reelection. In furtherance of this scheme, President Trump conditioned official acts on a public announcement by the new Ukrainian President, Volodymyr Zelensky, of politically-motivated investigations, including one into President Trump's domestic political opponent. In pressuring President Zelenskyy to carry out his demand, President Trump withheld a White House meeting desperately sought by the Ukrainian President, and critical U.S. military assistance to fight Russian aggression in eastern Ukraine.

The President engaged in this course of conduct for the benefit of his presidential reelection, to harm the election prospects of a political rival, and to influence our nation's upcoming presidential election to his advantage. In doing so, the President placed his own personal and political interests above the national interests of the United States, sought to undermine the integrity of the U.S. presidential election process, and endangered U.S. national security.

At the center of this investigation is the memorandum prepared following President Trump's July 25, 2019, phone call with Ukraine's President, which the White House declassified and released under significant public pressure. The call record alone is stark evidence of misconduct; a demonstration of the President's prioritization of his political benefit over the national interest. In response to President Zelensky's appreciation for vital U.S. military assistance, which President Trump froze without explanation, President Trump asked for "a favor though": two specific investigations designed to assist his reelection efforts.

The Republicans of the House Committees had released a countering report the previous day, saying in part that the evidence does not support accusations. "The evidence presented does not prove any of these Democrat allegations, and none of the Democrats' witnesses testified to having evidence of bribery, extortion, or any high crime or misdemeanor," said the draft report. This report also painted the push to impeachment as solely politically motivated. Its executive summary states that "The Democrats are trying to impeach a duly elected president based on the accusations and assumptions of unelected bureaucrats who disagreed with President Trump's policy initiatives and processes."

This report concluded the inquiry stage of the impeachment process and the House then voted on the approved articles of impeachment; Trump was impeached on December 18, 2019.

== Responses ==
=== White House ===
In the wake of the inquiry, the White House threatened to shut down all major legislation as political leverage. Trump and his surrogates engaged in a misinformation campaign to discredit impeachment, with Giuliani taking a lead role. Efforts focused on attacking Joe Biden and his son and attempting to discredit the whistleblower over their motivations and for making the complaint based on hearsay.

On September 30, CNN, citing an analysis by Laura Edelson at New York University's Tandon School of Engineering, reported that Trump and his reelection campaign had spent hundreds of thousands of dollars on Facebook advertisements to push for his defense. More than 1,800 ads on Trump's Facebook page that mentioned "impeachment" had run the week prior and had been viewed between 16 and 18 million times on Facebook. The analysis indicates the campaign spent between $600,000 and $2 million on the ads, which reportedly attempted to rally and enlist people for the "Official Impeachment Defense Task Force". A further $700,000 is believed to have been spent for ads on Pence's Facebook page, which mirrored the content on Trump's.

The White House officially responded to the impeachment proceedings in a letter from White House Counsel Pat Cipollone to House Speaker Pelosi that it would cease all cooperation with the investigation due to a litany of concerns, including that there had been no vote of the full House, and the secrecy of the proceedings. In the October 8 letter, the White House officially declined to cooperate with what they claimed was an illegitimate effort "to overturn the results of the 2016 election". The eight-page letter said the investigation "violates the Constitution, the rule of law, and every past precedent". Pelosi responded to the letter: "The White House should be warned that continued efforts to hide the truth of the president's abuse of power from the American people will be regarded as further evidence of obstruction."

During an October 17 press conference, White House acting chief of staff Mick Mulvaney said he "was involved with the process" of the freezing of military aid. Mulvaney gave his account of why Trump decided to hold back military aid to Ukraine. One, Trump felt the other European countries were not doing enough. Two, Trump felt Ukraine was a "corrupt place" which included having "corruption related to the DNC server" concerning "what happened in 2016". As a result, reporter Jonathan Karl told Mulvaney "what you just described is a quid pro quo. It is: 'Funding will not flow unless the investigation into the Democratic server happens as well.'" Mulvaney replied to Karl: "We do that all the time with foreign policy ... Get over it. There's going to be political influence in foreign policy." Later in the press conference, Mulvaney quoted a third reason on why military aid was frozen: they had yet to cooperate with a U.S. Justice Department investigation into alleged Ukrainian interference in the 2016 U.S. presidential election.

After media reports of these comments circulated, Republicans joined Trump's aides and legal counsel in distancing themselves from his remarks. Later that same day, Mulvaney issued a statement criticizing the media for their coverage of his comments and denying his earlier remarks, reiterating there was "no quid pro quo" regarding the withheld aid and requests to investigate the Democrats' behavior during the 2016 election.

==== Trump ====
Donald Trump
(@realDonaldTrump)
tweeted:

"... If the Democrats are successful in removing the President from office (which they will never be), it will cause a Civil War like fracture in this Nation from which our Country will never heal." Pastor Robert Jeffress, @FoxNews

September 29, 2019

Letter from President Trump to House Speaker Nancy Pelosi—December 17, 2019

President Trump's first known response was in a phone call with Nancy Pelosi, in which he started out the conversation alluding to background check legislation he knew Pelosi wanted passed. Pelosi made no direct allegation that Trump was offering to get the legislation passed in exchange for dropping the investigation, but noted that Trump abruptly changed the subject to his phone call with Ukraine being "perfect." President Trump later took to Twitter, criticizing opponents and praising supporters. He suggested that Representative Schiff, chairman of the House Intelligence Committee, could be arrested for treason, and quoted Pastor Robert Jeffress, who suggested that a "Civil War-like fracture" would occur if Trump were removed from office. Trump described the impeachment inquiry as "a coup, intending to take away the power of [the] people, their vote, [and] their freedoms", and said the Democrats were "wasting everyone's time and energy on bullshit". He compared the inquiry to lynching on his Twitter account, saying that "All Republicans must remember what they are witnessing here—a lynching! But we will WIN!"

Some Trump supporters also adopted the terms "coup" and "lynching", drawing criticism from opponents who pointed out that the impeachment process was neither violent nor extralegal, and that control of the Presidency would remain with the same political party even if successful. Some were offended by the comparison to a history of racially motivated murders by lynching in the United States, though Joe Biden and other Democrats had used the same term to criticise the impeachment of Bill Clinton (for which Biden apologized).

Trump told supporters at a private event on September 26 that the whistleblower's actions were close to that of a spy, saying, "You know what we used to do in the old days when we were smart? Right? The spies and treason, we used to handle it a little differently than we do now." The remarks were recorded and reported by the Los Angeles Times and interpreted as implying execution. On September 30, Trump said "we're trying to find out" who the whistleblower was.

On October 3, Trump told reporters that China should also investigate the Bidens. Vice President Pence echoed his support later the same day.

On November 6, Donald Trump Jr. tweeted a Breitbart News link purportedly revealing the name of the whistleblower.

As witnesses like Vindman and Yovanovitch gave public testimony, Trump has repeatedly attacked them on Twitter. He often describes them as "people I never heard of" and as "Never Trumpers", suggesting they are motivated only by opposition to his presidency. He tweeted a criticism of Yovanovitch during her testimony, which Schiff read to her while she was still on the stand; she described the effect of such comments as "very intimidating". Attacks on Vindman by the White House and Trump allies, who have questioned his patriotism, have caused him to consult with the Army about possible concerns for his safety and that of his family.

On December 17, Trump sent Speaker Pelosi a six-page letter objecting to the impeachment process and articles. The New York Times, The Washington Post, Politifact, and CNN reported about the many false or misleading claims in the letter.

=== Whistleblowers and their lawyers ===
Andrew P. Bakaj, the lead attorney representing the whistleblowers, sent a joint letter to Maguire on September 28, made public on September 29, in which they raised concerns about the language used by Trump, amongst other things. In the letter, the lawyers state "The events of the past week have heightened our concerns that our client's identity will be disclosed publicly and that, as a result, our client will be put in harm's way." The letter also mentioned the $50,000 "bounty" that two conservative Trump supporters have offered as a reward for information about the whistleblower.

Mark Zaid, co-counsel for the whistleblower, said in a statement in September 2019 that whistleblowers' identities are protected by law and cited testimony by Maguire which drew upon the Whistleblower Protection Act. The statement was released after Trump questioned on Twitter the validity of the whistleblower's statements. Bakaj took to Twitter to issue a warning on September 30 that the whistleblower is entitled to anonymity, is protected by laws and policies, and is not to be retaliated against; to do so would violate federal law. Bakaj argued in an October 25 Washington Post op-ed that the identity of his client is no longer pertinent after further events corroborated his client's account of the matter.

On November 7, Bakaj sent a letter to the White House warning Trump to "cease and desist" calling for the public disclosure of the whistleblower's identity and "engaging in rhetoric and activity that places [the whistleblower] and their family in physical danger". The lawyer said the president would be legally and morally liable if anyone were to be "physically harmed as a result of his, or his surrogates', behavior".

=== Politicians ===
Representative John Lewis says on September 24, 2019, "The time to begin impeachment proceedings, against this president, has come"

A majority of House members voted in favor of initiation of the impeachment inquiry, including 231 Democrats, and one independent, Justin Amash from Michigan, who left the Republican Party on July 4, 2019, in the wake of his protests about holding Trump accountable. Amash became a leading supporter of impeachment after the whistleblower report was released, saying the call script was a "devastating indictment of the president".

Republicans have largely focused their complaints on the inquiry process, particularly on the use of closed-door hearings, which they allege are secret Democratic hearings closed to Republicans. Forty-eight Republicans are members of the three committees jointly holding the hearings and thus are entitled to attend the hearings, and dozens have done so. In response to Republican complaints, Chairman Schiff pointed out that past impeachment inquiries began with an investigation by an independent prosecutor appointed by the Justice Department—the Watergate investigators in the case of Richard Nixon and the Whitewater prosecutors regarding Bill Clinton. "Unlike in past impeachment proceedings in which Congress had the benefit of an investigation conducted in secret by an independent prosecutor, we must conduct the initial investigation ourselves," Schiff said. "This is the case because the Department of Justice under Bill Barr expressly declined to investigate this matter after a criminal referral had been made."

==== For impeachment inquiry ====
A notable Republican critic of Trump, Senator Mitt Romney of Utah, called Trump's actions "troubling in the extreme" and "wrong and appalling". Romney said it strained credulity to say Trump's actions were anything other than politically motivated. However, in a later interview with The Salt Lake Tribune, Romney called his relationship with Trump "cordial and cooperative". He also refrained from indicating publicly whether he thinks the Senate should remove Trump from office, stating "an impeachment process is not a matter of public opinion or public parties. It's a matter of deliberation for the Senate."

Phil Scott, the Governor of Vermont, became the first Republican governor to support the impeachment inquiry. Charlie Baker, the Republican Governor of Massachusetts, also announced his support. Republican Maryland Governor Larry Hogan later announced his support for an inquiry, though clarifying he did not yet support impeachment itself.

On October 18, John Kasich, former Governor of Ohio and a CNN political commentator since January 2019, publicly said President Trump should be impeached. Until this point, he had argued that there was not enough evidence to impeach him.

During the fourth 2020 Democratic Party presidential debate, Andrew Yang said that while he supports impeaching Trump, he believes it may not be successful and would not solve the issues that led to Trump's election. He later said "Trump thrives on attention, even negative attention".

==== Against impeachment inquiry ====
Senator Lindsey Graham (R-South Carolina) criticized the whistleblower, calling the complaint hearsay and a sham.

On October 3, 2019, House Republican leader Kevin McCarthy called on Pelosi to suspend the inquiry and requested answers to 10 questions before it moved forward. Several Republican politicians, including Representative Jordan and former South Carolina Representative Trey Gowdy, who had been stout defenders of congressional oversight during the Obama Administration and the Investigation into the 2012 Benghazi attack, joined Trump's resistance to the investigation.

On October 23, more than two dozen Republican members of the House—led by Representative Gaetz and with Trump's prior knowledge and assent—staged a protest against impeachment proceedings by entering the SCIF where a hearing was about to commence, some carrying cellphones in violation of security protocols. The protest caused a five-hour stand-off during which the House Sergeant at Arms was summoned to intervene. Days earlier, Gaetz—who is not a member of any of the three committees—had entered the hearings and was instructed to leave after a parliamentarian ruling.

On October 24, Senator Graham, chair of the Senate Judiciary Committee proposed a Senate resolution (S. Res 378) condemning the closed door impeachment process and urging the House to hold a formal vote to initiate the impeachment inquiry, which by October 28, 50 Republican senators cosponsored. As of November 2019, only three Republican Senators, of the 53 in the Senate, Susan Collins of Maine, Lisa Murkowski of Alaska, and Mitt Romney of Utah, declined to cosponsor the resolution opposing the impeachment process.

As the articles of impeachment moved to a vote before the full House and referral to the Senate for trial, Senate majority leader Mitch McConnell met with White House Counsel Pat Cipollone and congressional liaison Eric Ueland, later stating, "everything I do during this I'm coordinating with the White House counsel. There will be no difference between the president's position and our position as to how to handle this." McConnell also said there was "no chance" the Senate would convict Trump and remove him from office while declaring his wish that all Senate Republicans would acquit Trump of both articles of impeachment. Two days later, Judiciary Committee chairman Graham said, "I am trying to give a pretty clear signal I have made up my mind. I'm not trying to pretend to be a fair juror here ... I will do everything I can to make [the impeachment trial] die quickly." The Constitution requires senators to take an impeachment oath, which by Senate rules then in effect stated, "I will do impartial justice according to the Constitution and laws, so help me God."

House Democrats Collin Peterson of Minnesota and Jeff Van Drew of New Jersey, the only two Democrats to vote against the initial October resolution, went public with their intentions to again vote against impeachment ahead of the House vote. Peterson issued that his "biggest problem" was that impeachment was always sought after by Democrats, "[T]hey've spent a year trying to figure out how they can make a case for it. That's backwards. I just don't agree with this."

=== Legal professionals and academics ===
==== Academics ====
Some historians and diplomats have called the severity of the allegations "unprecedented" in American history. Elaine Kamarck of the Progressive Policy Institute has described how this inquiry is different from Nixon's Watergate: "the president himself is directly involved in all four of the likely articles of impeachment": obstruction of justice, violation of federal election law (a possible constitutional abuse of power), obstruction of Congress, and violation of the emoluments clause.

Some academics responded to tweets by Trump in which he quoted Robert Jeffress, a prominent Southern Baptist pastor who warned of a "Civil War-like fracture" if Democrats continued the inquiry. On Twitter, Harvard Law School professor John Coates cautioned that the tweet was an independent basis for impeachment as the sitting president was threatening civil war if Congress exercised its constitutionally authorized power. A fellow faculty member of Harvard Law, Laurence Tribe, agreed but cautioned that, due to the typical tone of Trump's tweets, the statement could be interpreted as "typical Trumpian bloviating" that would not be taken seriously or literally.

==== Legal professionals ====
A group of 17 former Watergate special prosecutors published an opinion piece in The Washington Post in which they said the public record contains prima facie evidence that Trump had committed impeachable acts. Supreme Justice Ruth Bader Ginsburg, briefly spoke about the impeachment after she was directly asked about the Supreme Court intervening in the process after Trump had tweeted the suggestion on December 2. Ginsburg highlighted the reactive nature of the U.S. Judicial system, and cautioned that any senator who shows bias before the trial should not be allowed to serve as jurors in the impeachment trial, as any legal professional would be disqualified from a case if they acted similarly.

USA Today's Supreme Court correspondent Richard Wolf published an overview of the opinions of various legal experts, including law professors. The University of Texas's Sanford Levinson says "nobody really knows" how to define the "high crimes and misdemeanors" of the Constitution's impeachment clause. According to Georgetown University's Randy Barnett, "The Constitution gets violated all the time. That doesn't make the violation of the Constitution a high crime or misdemeanor." Barnett further states that Trump's accusers "have been alleging impeachable offenses since before [he] took the oath of office". The University of Southern California's Orin Kerr says, "It's about abusing the office, not about violating a technical provision of a particular clause," and "[Trump is] taking care of himself, not taking care of the country."

Following public impeachment inquiry hearings in the Intelligence and Judiciary House committees, more than 850 legal scholars signed an open letter stating Trump committed "impeachable conduct", asserting "his conduct is precisely the type of threat to our democracy that the Founders feared when they included the remedy of impeachment in the Constitution." Another open letter signed by more than 1,500 historians called for impeachment, stating "it is our considered judgment that if President Trump's misconduct does not rise to the level of impeachment, then virtually nothing does."

=== Others ===
In December 2019, Christianity Today published an editorial ("Trump Should Be Removed from Office") calling for Trump's removal from office, asserting among other criticisms that he "attempted to use his political power to coerce a foreign leader to harass and discredit one of the president's political opponents. That is not only a violation of the Constitution; more importantly, it is profoundly immoral."

== Public opinion ==
An analysis of polls showed that support for impeachment among the public grew after the Trump–Ukraine scandal first became public knowledge in September 2019, but through mid-December, Americans remained sharply divided on whether Trump should be removed from office.

In a YouGov poll on September 24, 2019, respondents said 55% would support, 26% would oppose, and 19% of respondents were undecided on impeachment if Trump was confirmed to have pressured the Ukrainian government. A Marist Poll for NPR and PBS around the same time frame claimed that a 50–46 plurality approved of the House's decision to start an impeachment inquiry. A poll by Politico and Morning Consult, released shortly after Pelosi announced her support for the inquiry, said support for impeachment increased seven percentage points week-over-week. A Business Insider poll on September 27 stated that 45% supported an impeachment inquiry, while 30% opposed. A September 30 Quinnipiac University poll stated that 56% of those polled thought members of Congress who support impeaching President Trump are doing so more on the basis of partisan politics than on the basis of the facts.

A poll conducted by The Economist and YouGov from October 16, 2019, stated that under half of their polled adults supported impeachment, and most of those respondents also support removal from office. Besides, it noted that a significant proportion of Americans (70% of Republicans, 38% of independents, and 13% of Democrats) believe a deep state is trying to obstruct or unseat President Trump. An October 17 poll from the Pew Research Center of 3,487 adults found that 54% were in favor of impeachment and 44% opposed.

A poll conducted on November 11–15, 2019, by NPR, PBS NewsHour and Marist Poll of registered American voters showed 45% of respondents favored impeachment and removal from office, while 44% of those polled opposed the idea. A poll on November 16–17, 2019, by ABC News and Ipsos, stated that 51% of those polled believe Trump was wrong in how he handled the Ukrainian situation and should be impeached. Ipsos also said 21% of polled American adults had made up their minds on impeachment due to the hearings, while the others polled said they had made up their mind prior to the hearings.

Polling of support for the impeachment inquiry among Americans
Poll source	Date(s) administered	Sample size	Margin of error	Support (Note: These polls are color-coded relative to the margin of error (×2 for spread). If the poll is within the doubled margin of error, both colors are used. If the margin of error is, for example, 2.5, then the spread would be 5, so a 50% support / 45% oppose would be tied.)	Oppose	Undecided
Monmouth University	Sep 23–29	1161	± 2.9%	49%	43%	7%
Politico / Morning Consult	Sep 24–26	1640 (Note: Polled registered voters.)	± 2.0%	43%	43%	13%
NPR / PBS NewsHour / Marist	Sep 25	864	± 4.6%	49%	46%	5%
Hill / HarrisX	Sep 26–27	1003	± 3.1%	47%	42%	11%
CBS News / YouGov	Sep 26–27	2059	± 2.3%	42%	36%	22%
Reuters / Ipsos	Sep 26–30	1917	± 2.6%	45%	43%	12%
Quinnipiac University	Sep 27–29	1115	± 3.6%	47%	47%	6%
Politico / Morning Consult	Sep 27–30	2488	± 2.0%	46%	43%	11%
USA Today / Ipsos	Oct 1–2	1006	± 3.5%	45%	38%	17%
Washington Post / George Mason	Oct 1–6	1007	± 3.5%	58%	38%	4%
Pew Research	Oct 1–13	3487	± 2.2%	54%	44%	–
NPR / PBS NewsHour / Marist	Oct 3–8	1123	± 3.4%	52%	43%	5%
The Wall Street Journal / NBC News	Oct 4–6	800	± 3.46%	55%	39%	6%
Fox News	Oct 6–8	1003	± 3.0%	55%	40%	5%
Politico / Morning Consult	Oct 7–8	1991	± 2.0%	50%	44%	6%
Quinnipiac University	Oct 11–13	1995	± 3.5%	46%	48%	7%
Politico / Morning Consult	Oct 11–13	1993	± 2%	50%	42%	8%
The Economist / YouGov	Oct 13–15	1136	± 3%	53%	40%	8%
Reuters / Ipsos	Oct 14–15	961	± 3.6%	44%	43%	12%
Quinnipiac University	Oct 17–21	1587	± 3.1%	55%	43%	3%
Emerson College	Oct 18–21	1000	± 3%	48%	44%	9%
Politico / Morning Consult	Oct 18–21	1989	± 2.0%	48%	42%	9%
Monmouth University	Oct 30 – Nov 3	908	± 3.3%	51%	44%	4%
NPR / PBS NewsHour / Marist	Nov 11–15	988	± 3.8%	48%	46%	5%
ABC News / Ipsos	Nov 16–17	506	± 4.8%	57%	38%	4%
Emerson College	Nov 17–20	1092	± 2.9%	43%	45%	12%
Politico / Morning Consult	Nov 22–24	1988	± 2.0%	48%	43%	9%

Polling of support for removal of Trump from office among Americans
Poll source	Date(s) administered	Sample size	Margin of error	Support	Oppose	Undecided
Monmouth University	Sep 23–29	1161	± 2.9%	44%	52%	5%
HuffPost/YouGov	Sep 24–26	1000	± 3.2%	47%	39%	14%
CNN / SSRS	Sep 24–29	1009	± 3.5%	47%	45%	8%
Washington Post / George Mason	Oct 1–6	1007	± 3.5%	49%	44%	7%
Gallup	Oct 1–13	1526	± 3%	52%	46%	2%
NPR / PBS NewsHour / Marist	Oct 3–8	1123	± 3.4%	48%	48%	4%
The Wall Street Journal / NBC News	Oct 4–6	800	± 3.46%	43%	49%	8%
Fox News	Oct 6–8	1003	± 3.0%	51%	44%	5%
Politico / Morning Consult	Oct 7–8	1991	± 2.0%	50%	42%	7%
The Economist / YouGov	Oct 13–15	1136	± 3%	53%	40%	7%
CNN / SSRS	Oct 17–20	1003	± 3.7%	50%	43%	7%
Quinnipiac University	Oct 17–21	1587	± 3.1%	48%	46%	6%
Politico / Morning Consult	Oct 18–21	1989	± 2.0%	50%	42%	8%
Washington Post / ABC News	Oct 27–30	1003	± 3.5%	49%	47%	4%
Monmouth University	Oct 30 – Nov 3	908	± 3.3%	44%	51%	4%
NPR / PBS NewsHour / Marist	Nov 11–15	988	± 3.8%	47%	47%	6%
ABC News / Ipsos	Nov 16–17	506	± 4.8%	51%	44%	4%
Quinnipiac University	Nov 21–25	1355	± 3.2%	45%	48%	6%

== See also ==
- Efforts to impeach George W. Bush
- Efforts to impeach Andrew Johnson
- Impeachment of Andrew Johnson
- Impeachment trial of Andrew Johnson
- Efforts to impeach Bill Clinton
- Impeachment inquiry against Bill Clinton
- Impeachment of Bill Clinton
- Impeachment trial of Bill Clinton
- Efforts to impeach Donald Trump
- First Impeachment of Donald Trump
- First Impeachment trial of Donald Trump
- Second impeachment of Donald Trump
- Second impeachment trial of Donald Trump
- Impeachment process against Richard Nixon
- List of federal political scandals in the United States
- United States House Judiciary Task Force on Judicial Impeachment
