= Jennifer Williams =

American diplomat

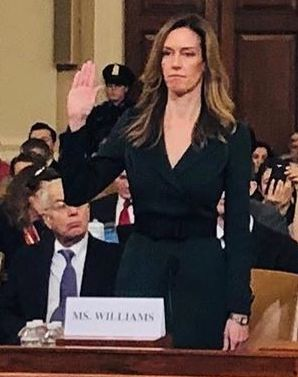
- Williams being sworn in to testify during the impeachment inquiry against Donald Trump

Personal details
- Party: Republican
- Education: Georgetown University (BA); Princeton University (MPP)

Jennifer Leigh Williams is an American United States Department of State official who served as a special advisor to U.S. vice president Mike Pence on European and Russian affairs. Williams testified under subpoena, in the impeachment hearings of Donald Trump, in closed-door hearings before the House intelligence, Oversight, and Foreign Affairs committees on November 9, 2019. She gave public testimony to the House of Representatives ten days later.

== Early life and education ==
Williams grew up in Houston, Texas. She attended Memorial High School in the Spring Branch ISD, serving as class vice-president and graduating in 2001. Williams earned a bachelor's degree in international security studies from the Georgetown University School of Foreign Service and a master's degree in public policy from the Woodrow Wilson School of Public and International Affairs at Princeton University.

== Career ==
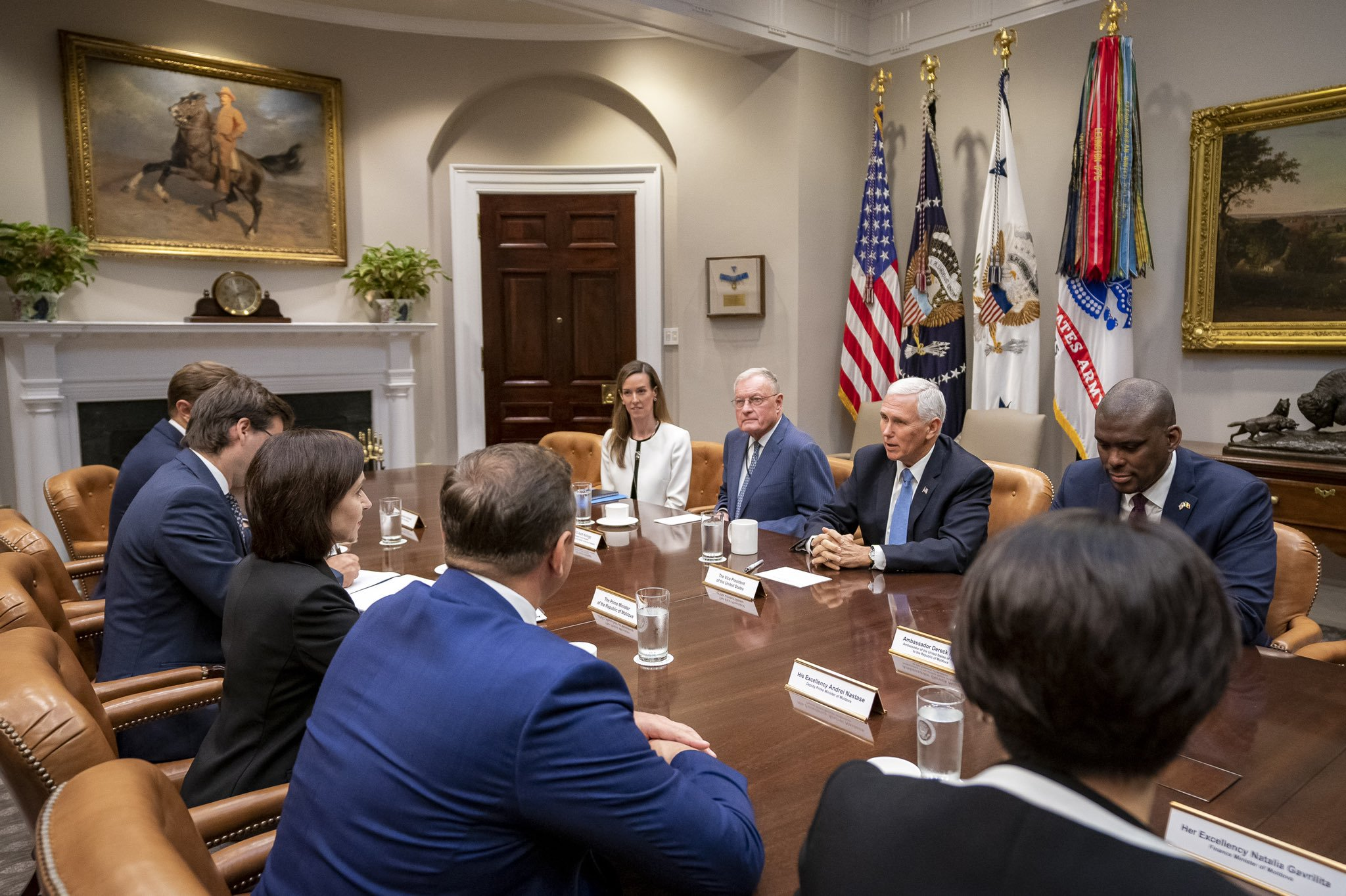
Williams (in white) joins Mike Pence in a meeting with Maia Sandu, 2019

Williams began her government career in the United States Department of Homeland Security in 2005, shortly after graduating from Georgetown. She served as a political appointee of Secretary Michael Chertoff, the second United States Secretary of Homeland Security, serving under President George W. Bush.

She then joined the United States Department of State in 2006, where she has served for more than thirteen years. She was initially focused on Middle East policy, and served overseas in Beirut and Kingston, Jamaica. She managed the U.S. government's humanitarian assistance program for Syrian refugees from 2011 to 2014, and then served as Special Assistant to the Deputy Secretary of State covering Near Eastern Affairs at the State Department headquarters in Washington, D.C.

Williams then served in London as the Press Officer for the United States Ambassador to the United Kingdom for three years.

Williams has served as Mike Pence's aide on European and Russian affairs since April 2019. Williams accompanied Pence when he traveled to Poland in September 2019 to meet with Ukrainian President Volodymyr Zelenskyy.

=== Impeachment inquiry against Donald Trump ===
External videos
- Testimony of Williams and Lt. Col. Alexander Vindman to the House Intelligence Committee, November 19, 2019, C-SPAN

Williams became the first witness from Pence's staff to give testimony in the impeachment inquiry against Donald Trump. She was expected to answer inquiries regarding Pence's communications with Rudy Giuliani and Ukrainian leaders. Williams was one of a few officials on Trump's July 25, 2019 call with Ukraine President Zelenskyy in which Trump asked the Ukrainian leader to open an investigation into one of Trump's domestic political opponents. She later indicated that she also overheard the July 25, 2019 call, and that the Trump administration wanted better knowledge about the controversy surrounding Burisma. She stated that she expressed concern over the phone conversation, which she described as "unusual." However, Williams' supervisor Lt. Gen. Keith Kellogg, said Williams "never reported any personal or professional concerns to him regarding the call...In fact, she never reported any personal or professional concerns to any other member of the Vice President’s staff, including our Chief of Staff and the Vice President".

Williams also testified that when Zelenskyy was elected, Pence initially agreed to attend the inauguration if his schedule permitted, but that plan was cancelled when on May 13, Williams was informed that President Trump had decided that Pence would not represent the U.S. at the inauguration in Ukraine after all. Williams also gave testimony about phone conversations between Pence and Zelenskyy, including one on September 18, noting that Pence told the Ukrainian President, "President Trump would be eager to hear about President Zelenskyy's progress in his reform agenda."

Williams has been recognized as one of the "powerful, professional women on both sides of the dais who have emerged as major figures in the impeachment investigation into President Donald Trump," and one of the witnesses who have "held their own" in the face of partisan attacks. Before her public testimony, Trump, without evidence, accused her of being a "Never Trumper," as he has with other witnesses. Williams, who started her government career in the Bush administration and called former Secretary of State Condoleezza Rice “a personal hero of mine,” denied being a “Never Trumper.”

On December 6, 2019, House Intelligence Committee Chairman Adam Schiff requested in a letter to Pence that he declassify more material related to Williams' testimony in the House impeachment investigation. Pence had already announced that he was willing to release transcripts and documents related to his September 18, 2019 phone call with Ukrainian President Zelenskyy. Williams testified about the call but at a later hearing announced that details about the phone conversation had been classified.
