= Tim Morrison (presidential advisor) =

American political advisor (born 1978)

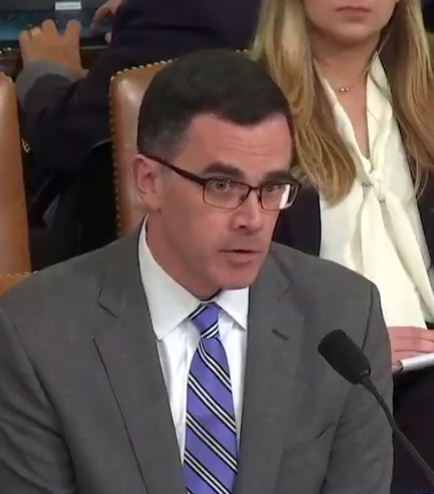

Senior Director for Europe and Russia on the United States National Security Council
- In office July 15, 2019 – October 31, 2019
- President: Donald Trump
- Preceded by: Fiona Hill
- Succeeded by: Andrew Peek

Personal details
- Born: Timothy Aaron Morrison c. 1978 (age 47–48)
- Party: Republican
- Education: University of Minnesota (BA); George Washington University (JD)

Timothy Aaron Morrison (born c. 1978) is an American Republican political adviser. He was briefly the top U.S. adviser to President Trump on Russia and Europe on the White House National Security Council, a position he took over from his predecessor Fiona Hill in August 2019, and from which he resigned on October 31, 2019.

Before that, he served as senior director for countering weapons of mass destruction -- "arms control and biodefense issues"—on the US National Security Council, a position he assumed on July 9, 2018. For about a year he was also responsible for pandemic response planning with the former staffers of the Council Directorate for Global Health Security and Biodefense, but was elevated to deputy assistant to the president. Prior to his administration positions, he had been policy director for the Republican staff on the House defense panel. Morrison entered politics as a professional staff member to Rep. Mark Kennedy, from 2000 to 2007. One day before his scheduled testimony to the impeachment inquiry against Donald Trump on October 31, 2019, Morrison was reported to be leaving his post soon as the senior director for European and Russian affairs on the National Security Council. He was to be replaced by Andrew Peek, at the time Deputy Assistant Secretary of State for Iraq and Iran in the Bureau of Near Eastern Affairs.

Morrison holds a Juris Doctor from George Washington University and a BA in political science from the University of Minnesota.

== Impeachment testimony ==
Morrison was among the people listening in on the July 25, 2019 phone conversation between President Trump and Ukrainian president Volodymyr Zelenskyy that is central to the impeachment inquiry against Donald Trump. He was a primary source of information regarding the matter to William B. Taylor, Jr., the acting US ambassador to Ukraine.

Morrison's deposition in the impeachment inquiry against Donald Trump, given behind closed doors on October 31, partially corroborated the earlier deposition by Taylor, in particular that U.S. Ambassador to the E.U. Gordon Sondland had told Andriy Yermak, an aide to Zelenskyy, via telephone that military aid to Ukraine, and a White House meeting with Trump, were conditional on a Ukrainian public announcement of an investigation into Burisma, and the Ukraine involvement in the 2016 U.S. presidential election. Morrison also testified that his concerns regarding the Trump–Zelenskyy call, which he promptly communicated to White House lawyers, were about repercussions if the transcript of the call was to be leaked, not about the legality of its content or quid pro quo. According to official transcripts of Morrison's closed door testimony, Morrison stated, "I want to be clear, I was not concerned that anything illegal was discussed," in the telephone call between Trump and Zelenskyy.

External videos
- Testimony of Morrison and Kurt Volker to the House Intelligence Committee, November 19, 2019, C-SPAN

During public testimony before the U.S. House of Representatives on November 19, 2019, Morrison stated that Sondland confirmed to him that there was indeed a quid pro quo requirement for US aid to Ukraine, and again brought up the telephone conversation between Sondland and Yermak, which took place on September 1, 2019.

== Subsequent career ==
Morrison is serving as a senior fellow at the Hudson Institute.

== See also ==
- Trump-Ukraine scandal
- Impeachment inquiry against Donald Trump
