= David Holmes (diplomat) =

American diplomat

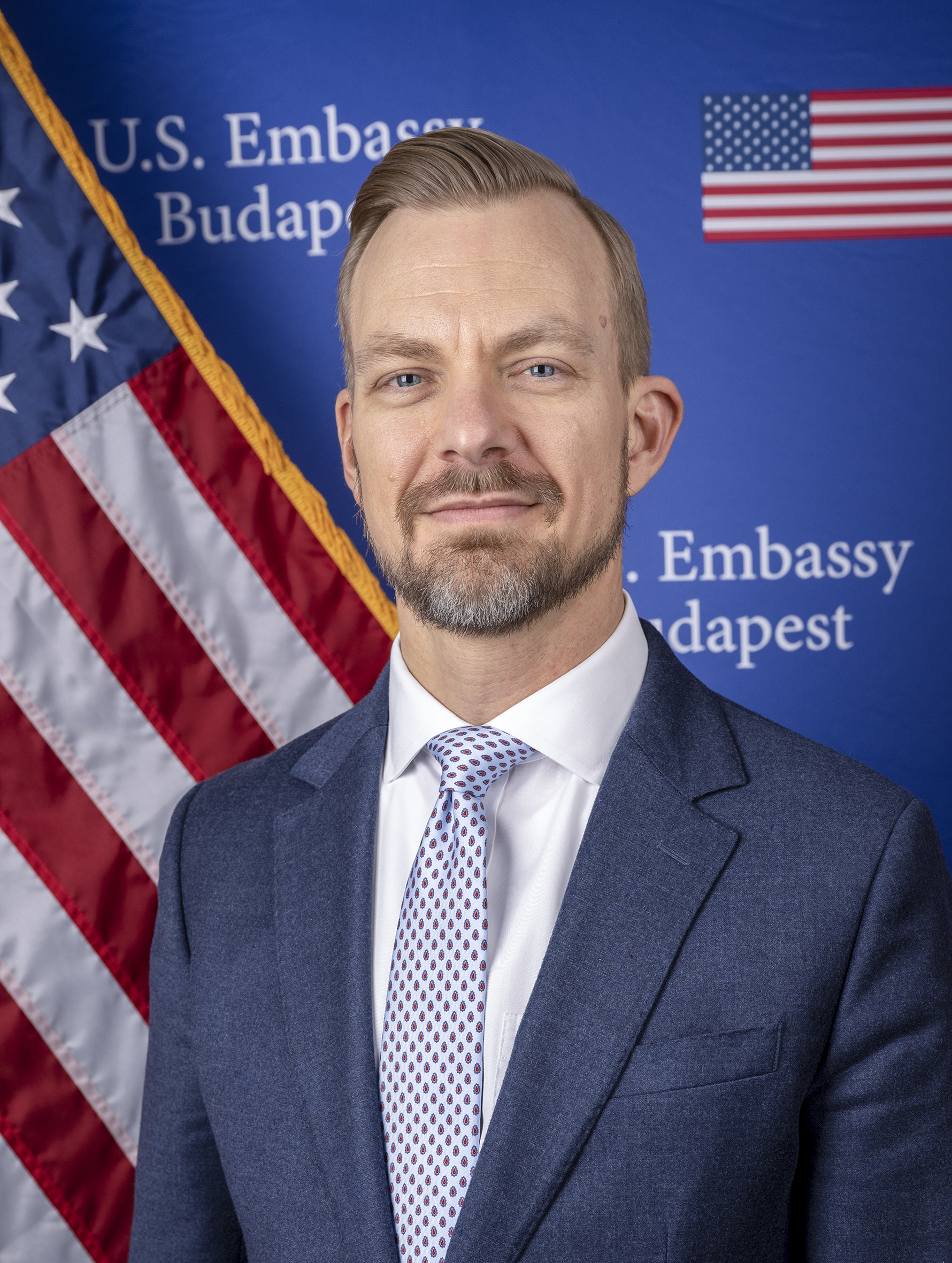

Personal details
- Born: David Andrew Holmes
- Education: Pomona College (BA); University of St Andrews (MA); Princeton University (MPA)

David Holmes is an American diplomat who served as a counselor for political affairs at the U.S. Embassy in Ukraine circa 2019-2020. He is at Georgetown University School of Foreign Service as Senior State Department Fellow, as of 2022.

Holmes testified in public and closed-door hearings before the House Intelligence, Oversight and Foreign Affairs committees in November 2019 as part of the Trump impeachment inquiry after the Trump–Ukraine scandal.

== Education ==
Holmes completed his undergraduate degree at Pomona College in Claremont, California, where he was the president of the Associated Students of Pomona College. He completed graduate degrees in international affairs at the University of St. Andrews in Scotland and in 2002 at the Princeton School of Public and International Affairs.

== Career ==
Holmes joined the United States Foreign Service in 2002. He served in several international assignments, including Kosovo, Bogotá, Kabul, and New Delhi. On his return to the U.S., Holmes served in Washington, D.C., from 2010 to 2011 as special assistant for South and Central Asia to then Under Secretary of State for Political Affairs William J. Burns. He was later detailed, from 2011 to 2012, to the United States National Security Council staff at the White House as director for Afghanistan. He then became the senior energy officer at the United States Embassy in Moscow, and then as deputy and internal unit chief in the Political Section.

In 2014, the American Foreign Service Association awarded the William R. Rivkin Award for Constructive Dissent to Holmes. The award recognizes "demonstrations of intellectual courage to challenge the system from within". He reflected on his work on Afghanistan and South Asia when he filed a formal Dissent Channel message in February 2013, arguing that multiple channels of authority within the State Department covering similar territory "hindered our diplomatic effectiveness".

=== U.S. Embassy in Ukraine ===
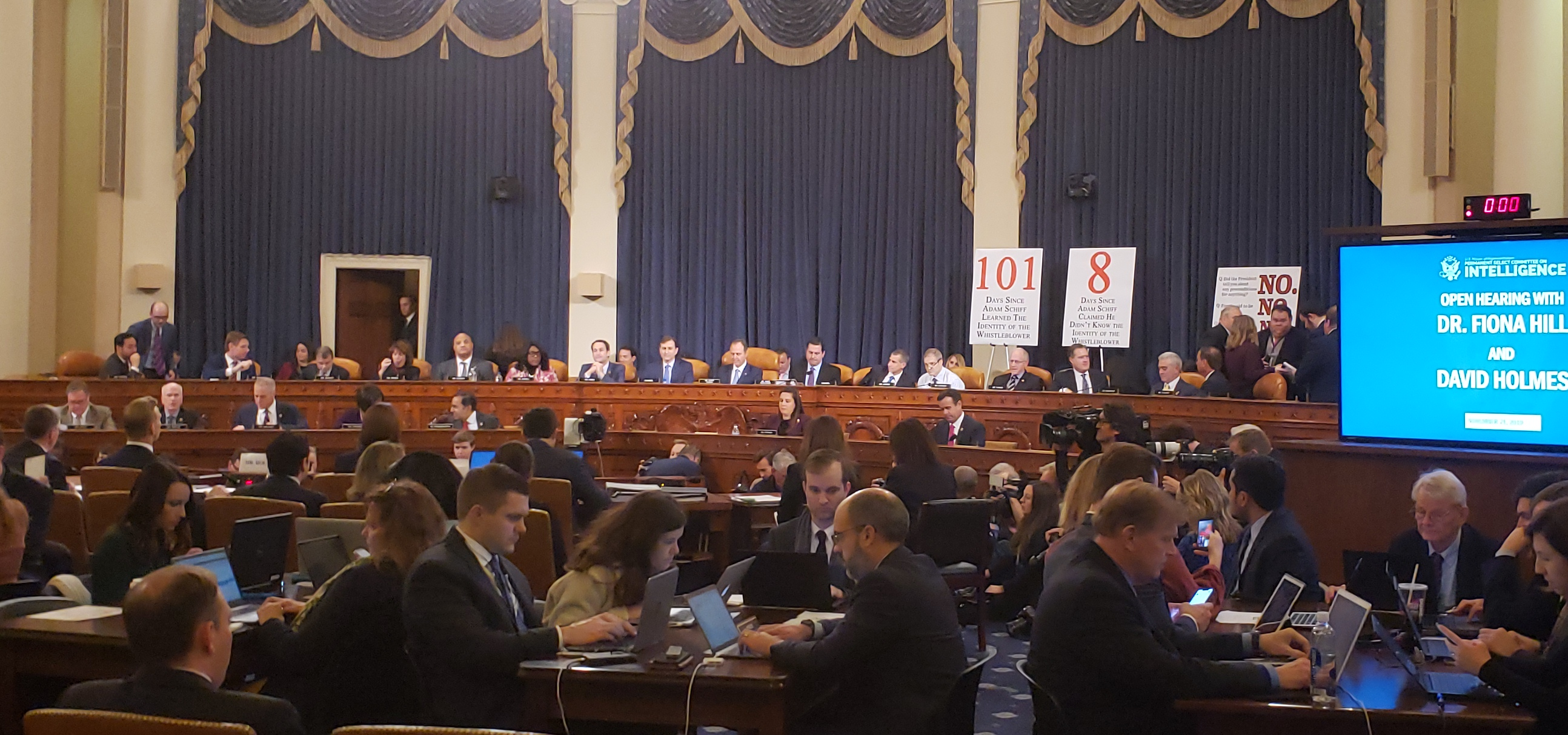
Open hearing with Dr. Fiona Hill and David Holmes

Holmes has served as a counselor for political affairs at the U.S. Embassy in Ukraine formerly under U.S. Ambassador to Ukraine Marie Yovanovitch and later William B. Taylor Jr., who was appointed to the role of chargé d'affaires for Ukraine under the Trump administration. The focus of Holmes' role is to help "Ukraine consolidate its democracy, reinforce the rule of law, advance justice and anti-corruption reforms, bolster civil society, and promote a responsive, responsible government."

Holmes was called to testify in a closed deposition as part of the impeachment inquiry against Donald Trump, and did so on November 15, 2019. Holmes testified that he overheard EU ambassador Gordon Sondland speaking to Trump via cellphone in a Kyiv restaurant, hearing Trump ask, "so, he's gonna do the investigation?" to which Sondland replied, "he's gonna do it", adding Zelenskyy would do "anything you ask him to". Holmes also testified that Sondland later told him that Trump "did not give a s—t about Ukraine" and "only cared about the big stuff ... the big stuff that benefits the president like the Biden investigation that Mr. Giuliani was pushing." He also recalled that Sondland characterized Zelensky's feelings toward Trump by telling the latter that Zelenskyy "loves your ass". He also said that there were two other state department witnesses to this as well, and has now become a prominent witness of the ongoing impeachment inquiry and the Trump–Ukraine scandal.

External videos
- Testimony to the House Intelligence Committee by Holmes and Fiona Hill, November 21, 2019, C-SPAN

On November 21, 2019, Holmes joined Dr. Fiona Hill, a former National Security Council official specializing in Russian and European affairs, in giving public testimony before the U.S. House of Representatives. Holmes expressed concern about Giuliani's role a campaign that involved attacking the ambassador to Ukraine, Marie Yovanovitch, as well as, a push for Ukraine to investigate interference in the 2016 presidential election and the Bidens. Holmes also described Sondland, former special U.S. Representative to Ukraine Kurt Volker, and U.S. Energy Secretary Rick Perry as “The Three Amigos” who ran the Ukraine campaign with Trump and Giulani.
