= Catherine Croft =

American diplomat

Catherine M. Croft is a United States Department of State official who has served as a special advisor for Ukraine both in the State Department and on the United States National Security Council. Croft testified in closed-door hearings before the House Intelligence, Oversight and Foreign Affairs committees in October 2019.

== Career ==
Croft worked as a Senior Research Associate for the Public International Law & Policy Group (PILPG) where, in 2006, she was involved in the Kosovo Program, contributing to a draft constitution, minority rights legislation, and final status negotiations. Prior to this position, she spent several years working in community development and public health in Latin America.

On September 23, 2010 The White House nominated Croft for a promotion in her role as Foreign Service Officer. She was promoted to Foreign Service Officer Class Four on Sept. 21, 2015

In 2012 Croft was one of the ELO's (entry level officers) to leave the U.S. Consulate General in Ciudad Juárez for the Baja peninsula to serve as a site officer, preparing for the G20 meeting that the United States Secretary of State would participate in.

Croft's work on Ukraine began in 2013 when she was posted to the U.S. Mission at NATO, where her work included NATO-Ukraine relations. When Russia invaded Ukraine, she was moved to the NATO Headquarters in Brussels. From August 2015 to July 2017, Croft was a Ukraine specialist at State Department Headquarters, working on security assistance, arms sales, defense reform and anti-corruption efforts. In July 2017 Croft was asked to join the National Security Council staff at the White House.

In her role heading the European Affairs Department of the White House NSC, Croft welcomed the Armenia-USA delegation of the Armenian parliament, which had meetings at the White House and the Congress in Washington D.C. During the meeting the Armenian MPs presented her with several issues regarding regional security, particularly regarding ceasefire violations on NKR-Azerbaijan border.

In 2018 Croft had served as the U.S. Director of Organization for Security and Co-operation in Europe and Director at the United States National Security Council.The OSCE is the world's largest security-oriented intergovernmental organization. Its mandate includes issues such as arms control, promotion of human rights, freedom of the press, and fair elections. It employs around 3,460 people, mostly in its field operations but also in its secretariat in Vienna, Austria and its institutions. It has its origins in the 1975 Conference on Security and Co-operation in Europe (CSCE) held in Helsinki, Finland.The OSCE is concerned with early warning, conflict prevention, crisis management, and post-conflict rehabilitation. Its 57 participating countries are located in Europe, northern and central Asia, and North America. The participating states cover much of the land area of the Northern Hemisphere. It was created during the Cold War era as an East–West forum.

In February 2018 Croft met with Parliamentary Assembly President George Tsereteli (Georgia) from the Organization for Security and Co-operation in Europe when he visited Washington meet with Members of Congress and officials from the U.S. National Security Council and State Department. Ukraine was the focus during a meeting of Tsereteli with Chris Anderson, Special Advisor to Ambassador Kurt Volker, Office of the U.S. Special Representative for Ukraine Negotiations; Elisabeth Millard, Principal Deputy Assistant Secretary for European and Eurasian Affairs; and Catherine Croft in her role as OSCE Director at the National Security Council. Tsereteli emphasized in his dialogue the "conflicts, human rights, hybrid threats from Russia, as well as role of America in addressing the challenges."

== Impeachment Inquiry ==
In the summer of 2019 Croft took over a role from colleague Christopher Anderson as deputy to then-Special Envoy for Ukraine Kurt Volker. Given that she had served at the National Security Council, focusing on Ukraine issues, and on the State Department's Ukraine desk, Croft is acknowledged to be "steeped in the policy issues" surrounding the U.S.-Ukraine relationship. Sources familiar with the department say Croft took "very specific interest in the" political-military portfolio of Ukraine but refused to work with Rudy Giuliani on Ukraine issues.

In her opening statement to congressional committees, Croft noted with regard to former Republican lawmaker Bob Livingston:

During my time at the NSC, I received multiple calls from lobbyist Robert Livingston, who told me that Ambassador Marie Yovanovitch should be fired. He characterized Ambassador Yovanovitch as an "Obama holdover" and associated with George Soros.
