= Kurt Volker =

American diplomat (born 1964)

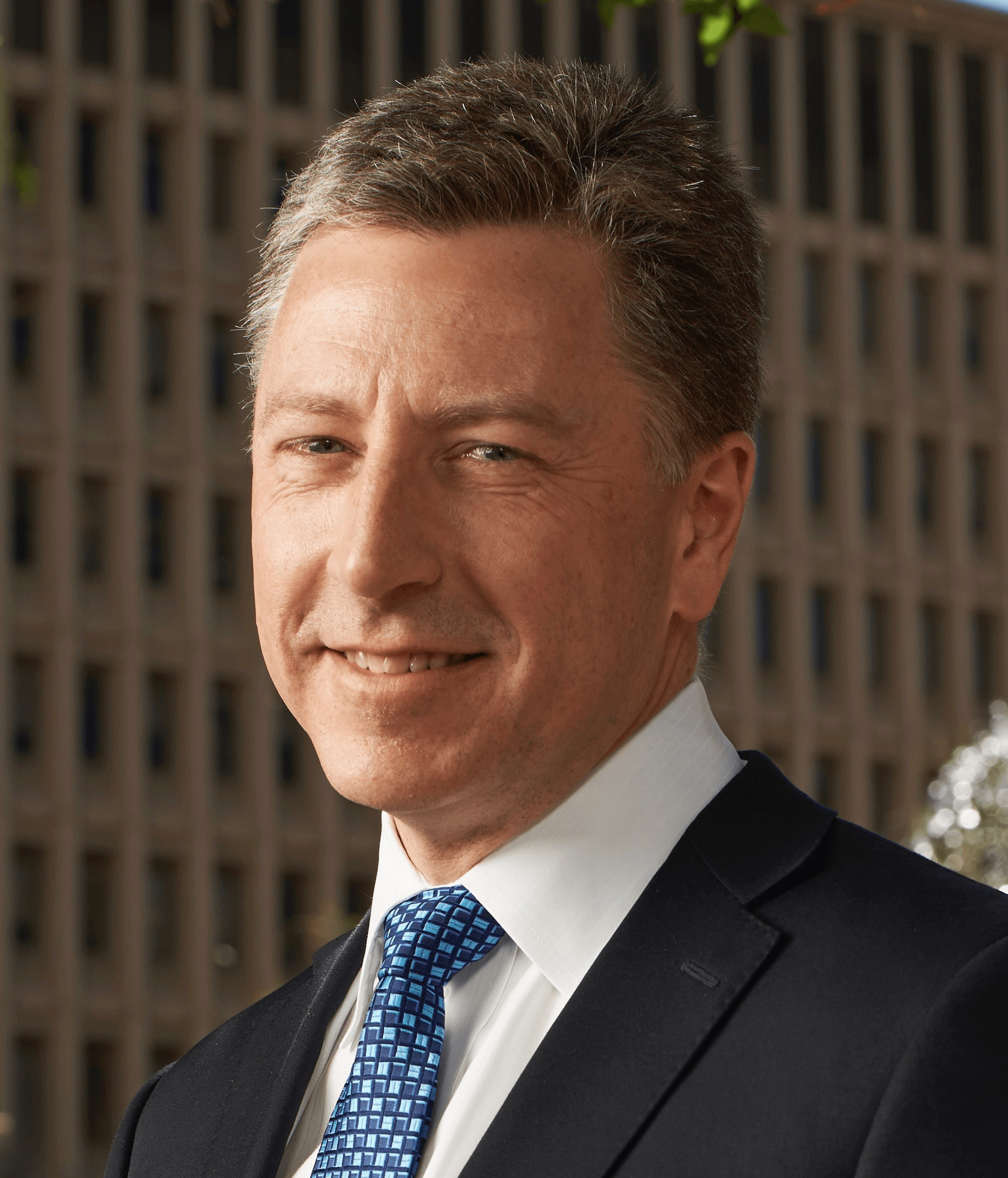

United States Special Representative for Ukraine Negotiations
- In office July 7, 2017 – September 27, 2019
- President: Donald Trump
- Preceded by: Position established
- Succeeded by: Vacant

21st United States Ambassador to NATO
- In office July 2, 2008 – May 13, 2009
- President: George W. Bush; Barack Obama
- Preceded by: Victoria Nuland
- Succeeded by: Ivo H. Daalder

Personal details
- Born: Kurt Douglas Volker; December 27, 1964 (age 61) Hatboro, Pennsylvania, U.S.
- Spouses: Karen Volker (divorced) Ia Meurmishvili (m. 2019)
- Education: Temple University (BA); George Washington University (MA)

Kurt Douglas Volker (born December 27, 1964) is an American diplomat who served as George W. Bush's last U.S. Ambassador to NATO. Later he served as executive director of the McCain Institute for International Leadership and in a volunteer capacity as Donald Trump's U.S. Special Representative for Ukraine until his resignation on September 27, 2019.

== Background ==
Kurt Volker was born in 1964 in Hatboro, Pennsylvania, to Benjamin and Thelma (Rowdon) Volker. After graduating from Hatboro-Horsham Senior High School, Volker graduated from Temple University with a B.A. in International Affairs in 1984. He was awarded an M.A. in International Relations from The George Washington University Elliott School of International Affairs in 1987.

== Career ==
=== Public service ===
After a short tenure as a CIA analyst, in 1988, Volker joined the United States Department of State as a Foreign Service Officer in the United States Foreign Service. While in the Foreign Service, he served in various assignments overseas including London and Brussels, and the US Embassy in Budapest (1994–1997). Volker was special assistant to the United States special envoy for Bosnia negotiations, Richard Holbrooke.

Volker served as a legislative fellow on the staff of Senator John McCain from 1997 to 1998. In 1998, he became first secretary of the US mission to NATO, and in 1999 he was sent to deputy director of NATO Secretary-General George Robertson's private office, serving in that position until 2001.

He then became acting director for European and Eurasian Affairs for the National Security Council. In that capacity he was in charge of US preparations for 2004 Istanbul summit of NATO members and the 2002 Prague summit. In July 2005, Volker became the Principal Deputy Assistant Secretary of State for European and Eurasian Affairs, serving in that position until he was appointed United States Permanent Representative to NATO in July 2008 by President George W. Bush. Volker served as Ambassador in that position from July 2, 2008, to May 15, 2009.

=== Private sector ===
Volker went into the private sector in 2009, becoming an independent director at The Wall Street Fund Inc, where he worked until 2012. He was a member of the board of directors at Capital Guardian Funds Trust beginning in 2013. Volker was also an independent director at Evercore Wealth Management Macro Opportunity Fund until 2012.

Volker served as a senior advisor at McLarty Associates, a global consulting firm from 2010 to 2011.

In 2011, he joined BGR Group, a Washington-based lobbying firm and investment bank, where he currently serves as a managing director in the firm's international group.

He then became executive director of Arizona State University's McCain Institute for International Leadership when it was launched in 2012. He resigned in 2019.

He has been a Senior Fellow at the Center for Transatlantic Relations, Johns Hopkins University School of Advanced International Studies since September 2009, and a senior advisor at the Atlantic Council since October 2009. Volker is currently listed as a trustee at the CG Funds Trust, and a member of the board of trustees at The American College of the Mediterranean (ACM), an American-style degree-granting institution in Aix-en-Provence, France. As an undergraduate, he was enrolled at ACM's study abroad institute, IAU College. He is also a member of the board of directors at The Hungary Initiatives Foundation. In addition, Volker is a member of the Atlantic Partnership.

Ukrainian media reported in June 2021 that Kurt Volker represents US investors that co-founded American University Kyiv in partnership with Arizona State University.

=== Special Representative for Ukraine ===
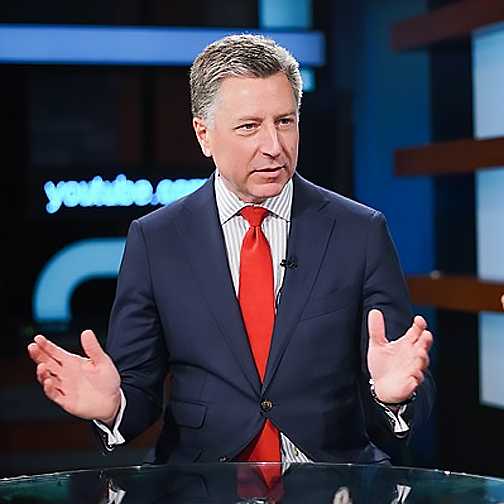
2017 interview of Ambassador Volker by Voice of America

On July 7, 2017, Secretary of State Rex Tillerson appointed Ambassador Kurt Volker as the US Special Representative for Ukraine Negotiations. Volker accompanied Tillerson on his trip to Ukraine two days later. On September 27, 2019, Volker resigned from this official, yet volunteer, position.

== Trump–Ukraine ==
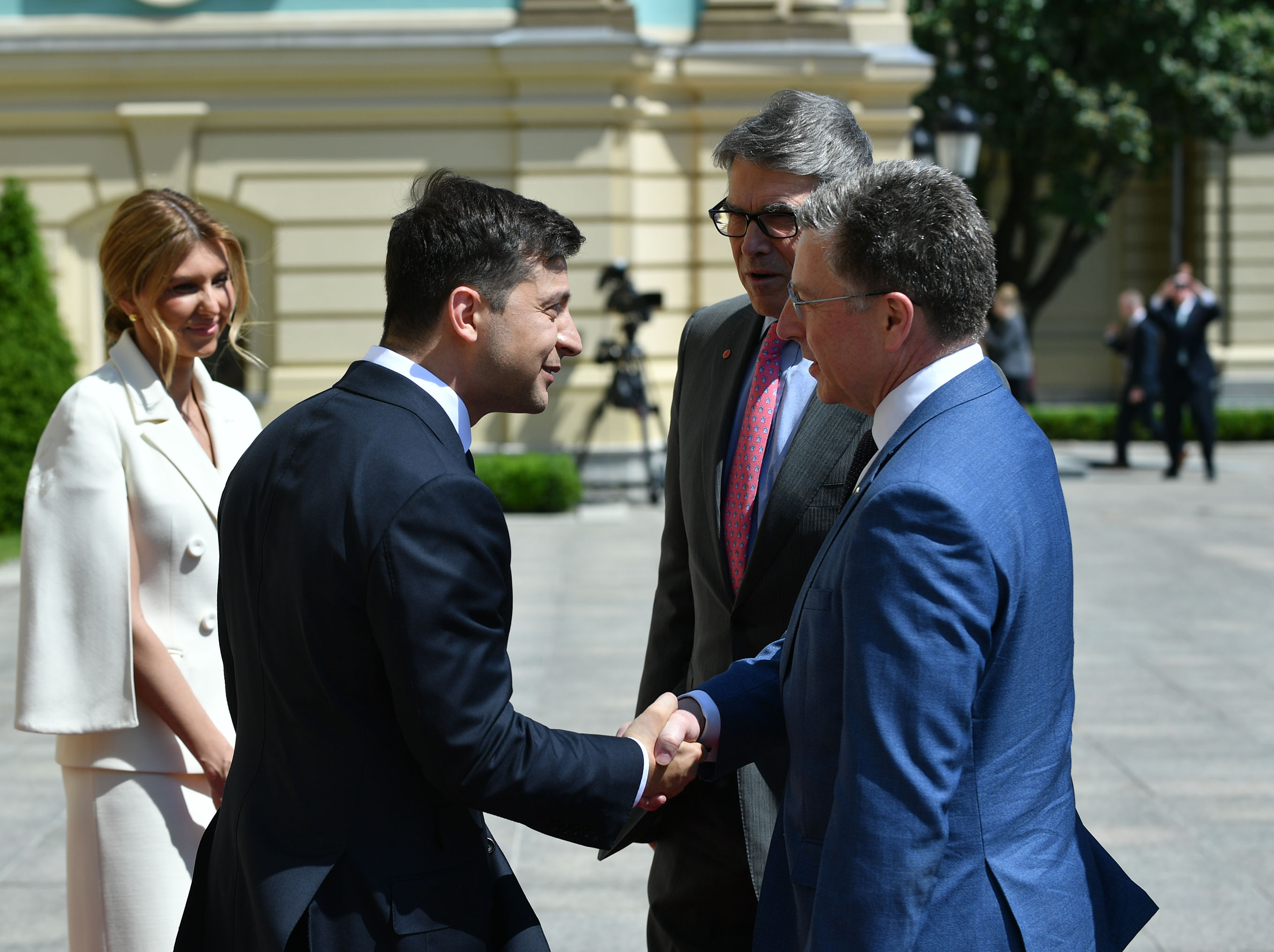
President Volodymyr Zelenskyy at his 2019 inauguration; he is shaking hands with Ambassador Volker as US Secretary of Energy Rick Perry looks on.

In mid-September 2019, reports began to surface suggesting that a whistleblower complaint had been submitted to Michael K. Atkinson, the Inspector General of the Intelligence Community, which he found to be credible and a matter of "urgent concern". Subsequently, claims were advanced by various chairmen of U.S. House committees that Kurt Volker, while acting in his official capacity as US Special Representative for Ukraine Negotiations, had been told by the White House "to intercede with President Zelensky" about investigations regarding Joe Biden and Paul Manafort. Volker met with Zelenskyy the day after President Trump spoke by phone with the Ukrainian president, a call which would later reportedly result in a whistleblower complaint. Two days after Volker's meeting, Director of National Intelligence (DNI) Dan Coats resigned, resulting in a stand-off regarding whether the new acting DNI would share the complaint with Congress.

On September 26, 2019, the United States House Permanent Select Committee on Intelligence released the unclassified text of this whistleblower complaint regarding the interactions between US president Donald Trump and Ukrainian president Volodymyr Zelenskyy. In this document, Volker and US Ambassador to the European Union Gordon Sondland were described as having "provided advice to the Ukrainian leadership about how to 'navigate' the request that the President had made of Mr. Zelensky".

That same day, Trump's personal attorney Rudy Giuliani posted on Twitter a screenshot that purported to be a text message from Volker to Giuliani, stating, "Mr. Mayor -- really enjoyed breakfast this morning. As discussed, connecting you here with Andrey Yermak [sic] who is very close to President Zelensky. I suggest we schedule a call together on Monday -- maybe 10am or 11am Washington time? Kurt".

NBC News has reported, in regard to the Volker text that Giuliani allegedly received, "Whether Volker was acting on orders from Trump is unclear, and the State Department hasn't said why Volker made the introduction, other than that the Ukrainian aide requested it. But the introduction ultimately led to a meeting between Yermak and Giuliani in Spain that the whistleblower wrote was a 'direct follow-up' to Trump's call."

In the White House memorandum of the July 25 telephone call between the two presidents, President Zelenskyy is quoted as saying, "I will personally tell you that one of my assistants spoke with Mr. Giuliani just recently and we are hoping very much that Mr. Giuliani will be able to travel to Ukraine and we will meet once he comes to Ukraine." Notably, the date on the screenshot of the purported text message from Volker to Giuliani is July 19, six days earlier.

On September 27, 2019, Volker resigned hours after congressional Democrats announced he would be called to provide a deposition.

Volker was interviewed in a closed session of the House committees leading the Trump impeachment inquiry on October 3, 2019, and his prepared statement was made public on October 4, 2019. The Washington Post reported that he asserted he had warned Giuliani that he (Giulani) was receiving untrustworthy information about the Bidens from Ukrainian political figures.

External videos
- Testimony of Volker and Tim Morrison to the House Intelligence Committee, November 19, 2019, C-SPAN

On November 19, 2019, Volker testified before the U.S. House of Representatives during a public hearing, during which he corrected or reversed statements he had made in his closed hearing, regarding mention of investigations, stating instead that Sondland "made a generic comment about investigations," which Volker and others found "inappropriate." He had previously said that he was not aware of any link between investigations and a White House visit. On November 21, 2019, David Holmes, who serves as head of political affairs in the US Embassy in Ukraine, described Volker, Sondland, and U.S. Energy Secretary Rick Perry as "The Three Amigos" who ran the Ukraine campaign with Trump and Giulani.

== Personal life ==
In June 2019, Volker married Georgian journalist for Voice of America Ia Meurmishvili. He was previously married to Karen Volker, with whom he had two sons. He speaks English, Hungarian, Swedish, and French.

Diplomatic posts
Preceded by Victoria Nuland	United States Ambassador to NATO; 2008–2009	Succeeded by Ivo H. Daalder
New office	United States Special Representative for Ukraine Negotiations; 2017–2019	Vacant
