= Igor Fruman =

Soviet-born American businessman

- Born: 1966 (age 59–60); Kalinkavichy, Soviet Union (now Belarus)

Igor Fruman (born 1966) is a Soviet-born American businessman. He is an associate of Rudy Giuliani who, along with Lev Parnas, aided in a search in Ukraine for detrimental information on U.S. President Donald Trump's political opponents. This included looking for evidence for a narrative to counter Robert Mueller's Special Counsel investigation and information on former Vice President Joe Biden. He pleaded guilty to an unrelated campaign finance law violation in September 2021 and was sentenced to a one-year prison term in January 2022.

== Career ==
Fruman was born in Kalinkavichy, Gomel Region, Belarus, and immigrated to the U.S., later working in Ukraine for a time. He lived in the Detroit metropolitan area before moving to South Florida. He has owned an import/export business in Ukraine as well as a beach bar named Mafia Rave in Odesa, Ukraine. Fruman attended the state funeral in December 2018 of former U.S. president George H. W. Bush, apparently as a guest of Rudy Giuliani. Fruman's marriage to Yelyzaveta Naumova ended in divorce.

Fruman partnered with Lev Parnas in an energy related venture. In addition to working on joint business and political efforts, Parnas and Fruman have been involved in Jewish charities and causes in the U.S., Ukraine and Israel. Fruman and Parnas are on the board of a Ukrainian-Jewish charity, "Friends of Anatevka", founded by Ukrainian rabbi Moshe Reuven Azman, to provide a refuge for Jews affected by the Russian military intervention in Ukraine. Parnas and Fruman visited Israel in the summer of 2018 as a part of a delegation, led by former Arkansas Governor Mike Huckabee and joined by Anthony Scaramucci, of "right-wing Jewish and evangelical supporters of Trump." While there, the group met with various leaders and personalities including the U.S. Ambassador to Israel, David M. Friedman, Benjamin Netanyahu's son Yair Netanyahu, as well as billionaire Simon Falic, one of Netanyahu's most generous donors. Huckabee joined the two once again in March 2019 when they were awarded with the "Chovevei Zion" (Lovers of Zion) awards at a gala for the National Council of Young Israel, an event focused on supporting President Trump and Israeli West Bank settlements. Rudy Giuliani and House Minority Leader Kevin McCarthy were in attendance as well. While in Israel, Parnas and Fruman also met with oligarch Ihor Kolomoyskyi, a wealthy Ukrainian under investigation by the Department of Justice for money laundering.

== Trump–Ukraine scandal ==
In 2018, Parnas and Fruman hired Giuliani, the president's personal attorney, to serve as a consultant as the two, according to Giulani, were "ramping up" a security business with the felicitous name "Fraud Guarantee". (Parnas had chosen the name "Fraud Guarantee" in 2013 to clean up his Google search results after accusations of fraud in previous ventures.) Florida authorities had apparently dissolved Fraud Guarantee in September 2014 for failing to file an annual report, which would have limited the company to activities related to closing itself down.

The Republican donor, Trump supporter and Long Island attorney Charles Gucciardo paid Giuliani on behalf of Fraud Guarantee in two $250,000 payments, in September and October 2018.

Late in 2018, Giuliani sent them to Ukraine to search for damaging information on Trump's U.S. political rivals. According to The New York Times, "Their mission was to find people and information that could be used to undermine the Special Counsel's investigation, and also to damage former Vice President Joseph R. Biden." Both were also at the center of the pro-Trump forces' push to remove Marie Yovanovitch, the U.S. ambassador to Ukraine, because her loyalty to President Trump was deemed deficient as Trump pursued his agenda there. It is also alleged that the two pressed for support for allegations that former Ukrainian officials schemed to manipulate the 2016 election to support Hillary Clinton, by revealing adverse information about Paul Manafort, chairman of Trump's campaign, which became a central element in Mueller's special counsel investigation.

Also, over the course of a year beginning in 2018, the two men introduced Giuliani to Ukrainians who were amenable to promoting "a largely unsubstantiated narrative about the Bidens." These included Yuriy Lutsenko, a former Prosecutor General of Ukraine, who was critical to Giuliani's efforts to produce damaging information. Viktor Shokin, also a former Prosecutor General of Ukraine, was part of this group. Parnas and Robert F. Hyde reportedly exchanged messages indicating that then-Ambassador Marie Yovanovitch was under surveillance and that they were working to have her removed.

The New York field office of the Federal Bureau of Investigation (FBI), along with SDNY prosecutors, are conducting a criminal investigation of Giuliani's relationship with Parnas and Fruman. Giuliani is under investigation for potentially violating lobbying laws. Parnas was initially being legally represented by John M. Dowd, who was Trump's personal attorney in the Mueller investigation in 2017–18, until he fired him and hired Joseph A. Bondy. Dowd initially represented Fruman as well.

== Arrest ==
Fruman and Lev Parnas were arrested on the evening of October 9, 2019, at Dulles International Airport, and charged with planning to direct funds from a foreign government "to U.S. politicians while trying to influence U.S.-Ukraine relations". They had one-way tickets to Frankfurt, Germany, and were reported to be going to Vienna, Austria. The reason for their arrest was described as a "complex web of financial and political interactions linking diplomacy to alleged violations of campaign finance law." The head of the New York's FBI office described the investigation as "about corrupt behavior, deliberate lawbreaking". Fruman and Parnas pled not guilty to these charges and to additional charges filed in September 2020. Fruman did, however, plead guilty on September 10, 2021, to soliciting a contribution from a foreign national. He did not make an agreement to cooperate with the government. As part of his plea, he admitted to donating a million dollars he solicited from Andrey Muraviev to Republicans in Nevada, Florida, and other states. He was sentenced to one year in prison in January 2022. He maintained that he was not aware of the legal prohibition on foreign campaign contributions when he engaged in the donation scheme.

The 2019 charges also connected Parnas and Fruman to the campaign to oust the United States ambassador to Ukraine, Marie Yovanovitch, from her post and have her recalled. This occurred over many months. In 2018, the operation included Parnas and Fruman donating funds and pledging further additional moneys to an unnamed Congressman, who was recruited for the "campaign to oust her." Some of the funds violated campaign limits. The funds were funneled through a shell company, Global Energy Producers. Parnas and Fruman were also charged with unlawful campaign contributions. Based on campaign finance filings, former congressional Representative Pete Sessions (R-Texas) has been identified as the unnamed Congressman. In 2018, as the Chairman of the House Rules Committee, Sessions wrote a letter to Secretary of State Mike Pompeo saying that Yovanovitch should be fired for privately expressing "disdain" for the Trump administration.

== See also ==
- Foreign interference in the 2020 United States elections
- Rudy Giuliani
- Lev Parnas
