= 2019 Trump–Ukraine scandal =

The 2019 Trump–Ukraine political scandal arose primarily from the discovery of U.S. president Donald Trump's attempts to coerce Ukraine into investigating his political rival Joe Biden and thus potentially damage Biden's campaign for the 2020 Democratic Party presidential nomination. Trump enlisted surrogates in and outside his administration, including personal lawyer Rudy Giuliani and Attorney General William Barr, to pressure Ukraine and other governments to cooperate in supporting and legitimizing the Biden–Ukraine conspiracy theory and other conspiracy theories concerning U.S. politics. Trump blocked payment of a congressionally mandated $400 million military aid package, in an attempt to obtain quid pro quo cooperation from Ukrainian president Volodymyr Zelenskyy. Contacts were established between the White House and government of Ukraine, culminating in a phone call between Trump and Zelenskyy on July 25, 2019.

Trump released the aid after becoming aware of a whistleblower complaint made in August 2019, before the complaint was known by Congress or the public. The scandal reached public attention in mid-September 2019. The complaint raised concerns about Trump using powers to solicit foreign electoral intervention in the 2020 U.S. presidential election. The White House corroborated allegations raised by the whistleblower. A transcript of the Trump–Zelenskyy call confirmed Trump requested investigations into Joe Biden and his son Hunter Biden, as well as a conspiracy theory involving a Democratic National Committee server, while urging Zelenskyy to work with Giuliani and Barr on this.

Former acting chief of staff Mick Mulvaney said one reason why Trump withheld aid to Ukraine was Ukrainian "corruption related to the DNC server", referring to a debunked theory that Ukrainians framed Russia for hacking into the DNC system. Trump has publicly urged Ukraine and China to investigate the Bidens. The Trump administration's top diplomat to Ukraine, Bill Taylor, testified he was told aid to Ukraine and a Trump–Zelenskyy White House meeting were conditional on Zelenskyy announcing investigations into the Bidens and alleged Ukrainian interference in the 2016 U.S. elections. U.S. ambassador to the EU Gordon Sondland testified he worked with Giuliani at Trump's "express direction" to arrange a quid pro quo with the Ukraine government.

On September 24, 2019, the House of Representatives began a formal impeachment inquiry into Trump. On October 31, 2019, the House of Representatives voted to approve guidelines for the next phase of impeachment. Trump was impeached on charges of abuse of power and obstruction of Congress, but was acquitted by the Senate.

On December 3, 2019, as part of the inquiry, the House Intelligence Committee published a report detailing that "President Trump, personally and acting through agents within and outside of the U.S. government, solicited the interference of a foreign government, Ukraine, to benefit his reelection. ...President Trump conditioned official acts on a public announcement by the new Ukrainian president...of politically-motivated investigations, including one into Joe Biden, one of Trump's domestic political opponents. In pressuring President Zelenskyy to carry out his demand, President Trump withheld a White House meeting desperately sought by the Ukrainian president, and critical U.S. military assistance to fight Russian aggression in eastern Ukraine." In January 2020, the Government Accountability Office, a non-partisan watchdog, concluded the White House broke federal law by withholding Congress-approved military aid to Ukraine.

== Background ==
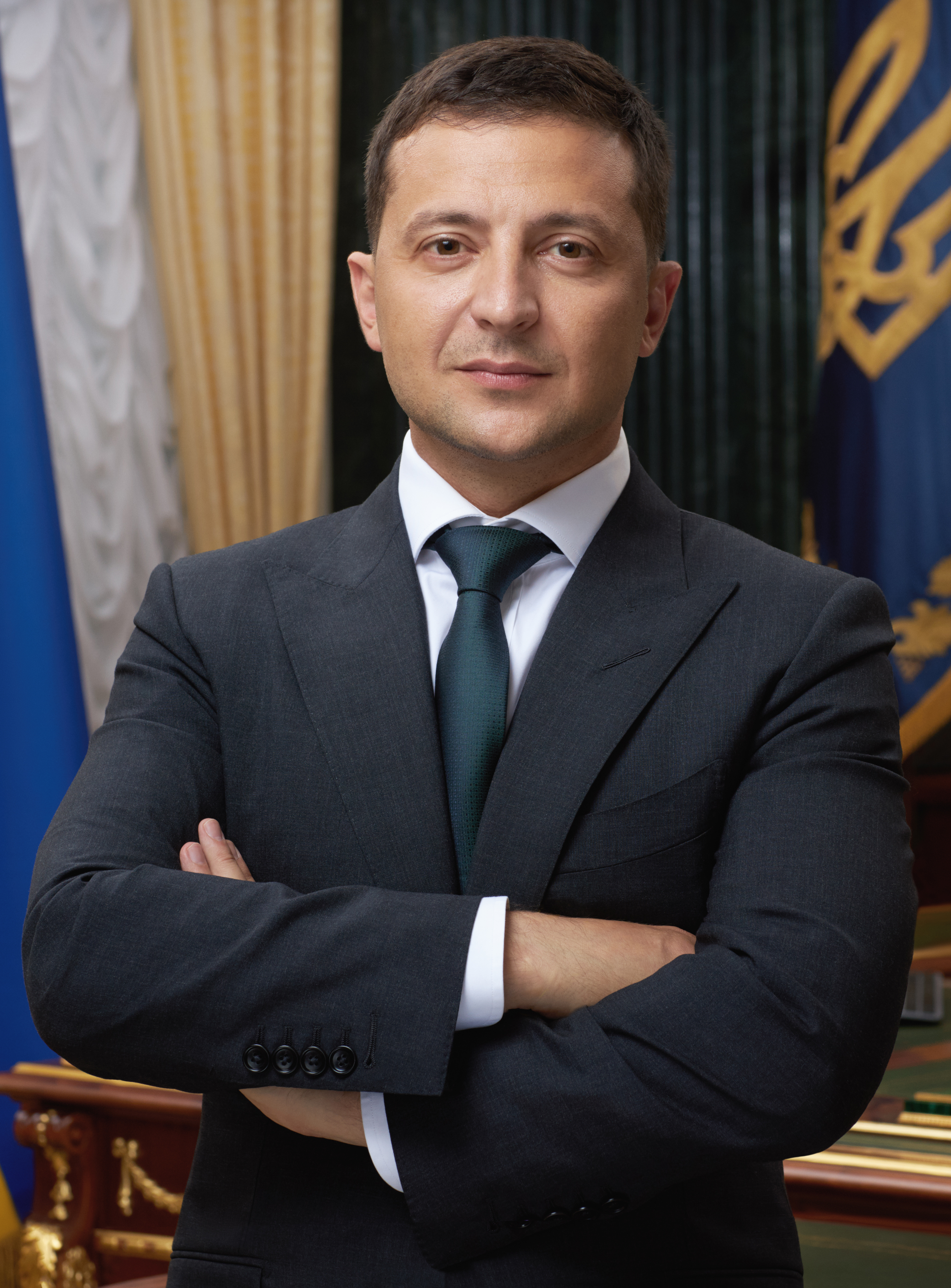
Ukrainian president Volodymyr Zelenskyy

The scandal came to light when a whistleblower report revealed that President Trump had asked Ukrainian president Volodymyr Zelenskyy in July 2019 to investigate Joe Biden, Trump's political opponent in the 2020 presidential election, his son Hunter Biden, and company CrowdStrike, to discuss these matters with Trump's personal attorney Rudy Giuliani and Attorney General William Barr. The allegations were confirmed by a non-verbatim summary of the conversation released by the White House. Trump acknowledged he had told Zelenskyy "we don't want our people like Vice President Biden and his son [contributing] to the corruption already in the Ukraine." According to the whistleblower, the call was part of a wider campaign by Trump, his administration, and Giuliani to pressure Ukraine into investigating the Bidens, which may have included Trump's cancelling a scheduled trip to Ukraine by Vice President Mike Pence, and Trump withholding $400 million in military aid from Ukraine.

Immediately after the Trump–Zelenskyy call ended, White House national security aides discussed their deep concerns, with at least one National Security Council (NSC) official alerting White House national security lawyers. A text message between a State Department envoy to Ukraine and a Ukrainian official showed the envoy understood from the White House that a Zelenskyy visit with Trump was contingent upon Ukraine's investigating a conspiracy theory about alleged Ukrainian meddling in the 2016 U.S. presidential election.

Records of the Trump–Zelenskyy call were moved from the system where presidential call transcripts are typically stored to a system reserved for the government's most sensitive secrets. The Trump administration had also similarly restricted access to records of Trump's conversations with the leaders of China, Russia, Saudi Arabia, and Australia. It was subsequently revealed that this placement had been made for political rather than national security reasons.

The first whistleblower complaint was filed on August 12, 2019, reportedly by a CIA officer detailed to the White House. It was based both on "direct knowledge of certain alleged conduct" and on the accounts of more than "half a dozen U.S. officials". The complaint was eventually released to congressional intelligence committees on September 25, 2019, and a redacted version of the complaint was made public the next day. On October 6, 2019, attorney Mark Zaid announced the existence of a second official whistleblower, an intelligence official with firsthand knowledge who had spoken with the inspector general of the Intelligence Community but had not yet contacted the congressional committees involved in the investigation.

The whistleblower's complaint prompted a referral to the Department of Justice Criminal Division. On September 25, a Department of Justice spokeswoman, Kerri Kupec, announced that the division had "concluded the matter" and determined that the call did not constitute a campaign finance violation. On October 3, after Trump publicly called for China and Ukraine to investigate Joe and Hunter Biden, Federal Election Commission (FEC) chair Ellen Weintraub reiterated that "it is illegal for any person to solicit, accept, or receive anything of value from a foreign national in connection with a U.S. election."

Trump has denied all wrongdoing. He confirmed that he had withheld aid from Ukraine, while offering contradicting reasons for doing so. Trump first claimed it was withheld because of corruption in Ukraine, but later said it was because other nations, including those in Europe, were not contributing enough aid to Ukraine. European Union institutions provided more than twice the amount of aid to Ukraine than did the United States during 2016-17, and Trump's budget proposal sought to cut billions of dollars from U.S. initiatives to fight corruption and encourage reform in Ukraine and elsewhere.

Trump has repeatedly attacked the whistleblower and sought information about the whistleblower. In October 2019, after mentioning that the U.S. has "tremendous power" in the trade war with China "if they don't do what we want", Trump publicly urged Ukraine and China to investigate the Bidens. As of October 2019, there has been no evidence produced of any alleged wrongdoing by the Bidens. Trump, his supporters, and right-wing media have spread multiple conspiracy theories regarding Ukraine, the Bidens, the whistleblower, and the foreign interference in the 2016 election. The scope of the scandal expanded on October 9, when arrests were made by the FBI of two of Giuliani's clients involved in political and business affairs in the U.S. and Ukraine, as well as news two days later that Giuliani himself was under federal investigation.

=== President Donald Trump ===
Before this scandal came to light, U.S. president Donald Trump indicated he would accept foreign intelligence on his political rivals. In June 2019, Trump was interviewed by George Stephanopoulos, who asked: "If foreigners, if Russia, if China, if someone else offers you information on an opponent, should they accept it or should they call the FBI?" Trump responded: "I think maybe you do both. I think you might want to listen. I don't. There's nothing wrong with listening. If somebody called from a country—Norway—we have information on your opponent. Oh. I think I'd want to hear it." After Trump said this, the chair of the Federal Election Commission, Ellen Weintraub, reminded Americans that according to federal law: "It is illegal for any person to solicit, accept, or receive anything of value from a foreign national in connection with a U.S. election." Previously in July 2016, while Trump was still a candidate in the 2016 United States presidential election, he made a request: "Russia, if you're listening, I hope you're able to find the 30,000 emails that are missing" from 2016 Democratic presidential candidate Hillary Clinton's email server.

=== Ukraine and the Bidens ===
In 2014, the Obama administration was trying to provide diplomatic support to the post-2014 Ukrainian revolution Yatsenyuk government in Ukraine, and then-vice president Joe Biden was "at the forefront" of those efforts. Hunter Biden joined the board of directors of Burisma Holdings on April 18, 2014. Hunter, then an attorney with Boies Schiller Flexner, was hired to help Burisma with corporate governance best practices, and a consulting firm in which Hunter is a partner was also retained by Burisma. In a December 2015 interview, Joe Biden said he had never discussed Hunter's work at Burisma. Joe Biden traveled to Ukrainian capital Kyiv on April 21, 2014, and urged the Ukrainian government "to reduce its dependence on Russia for supplies of natural gas". He discussed how the United States could help provide technical expertise for expanding domestic production of natural gas.

Since 2012, the Ukrainian prosecutor general had been investigating Burisma's owner, oligarch Mykola Zlochevsky, over allegations of money laundering, tax evasion, and corruption. In 2015, Viktor Shokin became the prosecutor general, inheriting the investigation. The Obama administration, other governments, and non-governmental organizations soon became concerned that Shokin was not adequately pursuing corruption in Ukraine, was protecting the political elite, and was regarded as "an obstacle to anti-corruption efforts". Among other issues, he was slow-walking the investigation into Zlochevsky and Burisma, to the extent that Obama administration officials were considering launching their own criminal investigation into the company for possible money laundering. Shokin has said he believes he was fired because of his Burisma investigation, where Hunter Biden was allegedly a subject. However, that investigation was dormant at the time Shokin was fired. In December 2015, then-vice president Biden visited Kyiv and informed the Ukrainian government that $1 billion in loan guarantees would be withheld unless anti-corruption reforms were implemented, including the removal of Shokin. Ukraine's parliament voted to dismiss Shokin in March 2016. The loan guarantees were finally approved on June 3, after additional reforms were made.

At the time, corruption in Ukraine was a matter of bipartisan concern in the U.S., with Republican senators Rob Portman, Mark Kirk, and Ron Johnson co-signing a Senate Ukraine Caucus letter in February 2016 urging then-President Poroshenko to implement reforms, including "to press ahead with urgent reforms to the Prosecutor General's office". Biden was not alone in targeting Shokin for anti-corruption reasons; he was joined by other European and U.S. officials. Former U.S. ambassador to Ukraine Geoffrey Pyatt and the assistant secretary of state Victoria Nuland both said in 2015 that Shokin's office was failing to root out corruption. In March 2016, testimony to the Senate Foreign Relations Committee, former ambassador to Ukraine John E. Herbst stated, "By late fall of 2015, the EU and the United States joined the chorus of those seeking Mr. Shokin's removal" and that Joe Biden "spoke publicly about this before and during his December visit to Kyiv."

During the same hearing, Nuland stated, "we have pegged our next $1 billion loan guarantee, first and foremost, to having a rebooting of the reform coalition so that we know who we are working with, but secondarily, to ensuring that the prosecutor general's office gets cleaned up." Meanwhile, protests within Ukraine were calling for Shokin's removal, and the International Monetary Fund (IMF) also threatened to delay $40 billion of aid in light of corruption in Ukraine. Anders Åslund, a resident senior fellow at the Atlantic Council, said that "Everyone in the Western community wanted Shokin sacked ... The whole G-7, the IMF, the EBRD [European Bank for Reconstruction and Development], everybody was united that Shokin must go, and the spokesman for this was Joe Biden." The European Union eventually praised Shokin's dismissal due to a "lack of tangible results" of his office's investigations, and also because people in Shokin's office were themselves being investigated.

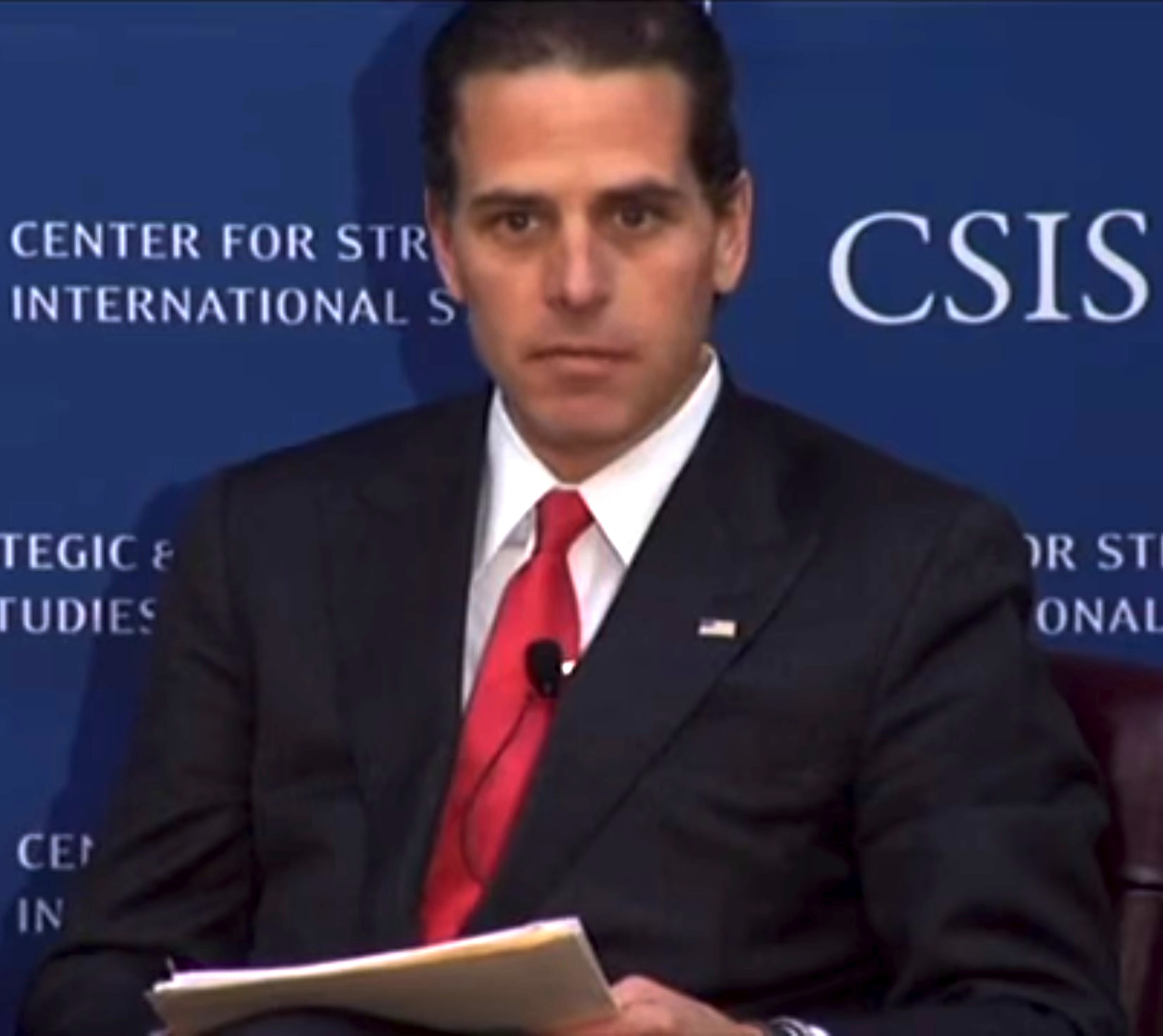
Hunter Biden in 2013

As of May 16, 2019, when the prosecutor general's office cleared Biden and his son of alleged corruption, there is no evidence that Biden acted to protect his son's involvement with Burisma, although Trump, Giuliani, and their allies have fueled speculation. Shokin's successor, Yuriy Lutsenko, initially took a hard line against Burisma, but within a year, Lutsenko announced that all legal proceedings and pending criminal allegations against Zlochevsky had been "fully closed". In a related 2014 investigation by the United Kingdom, British authorities froze U.K. bank accounts tied to Zlochevsky; however, the investigation was later closed due to a lack of evidence. Lutsenko said in May 2019 that there was no evidence of wrongdoing by the Bidens, but he was planning to provide information to Attorney General William Barr about Burisma board payments so American authorities could verify whether Hunter Biden had paid U.S. taxes.

In November 2019, Senator Rand Paul asserted that the whistleblower "is a material witness to the possible corruption of Hunter Biden and Joe Biden," adding, "[the whistleblower] might have traveled with Joe Biden to Ukraine for all we know," calling for investigators to subpoena the whistleblower. Asked for evidence to support his allegations, Paul replied, "we don't know unless we ask." Senator Lindsey Graham, the Senate Judiciary Committee chair, responded by saying "What basis does he have to say that? He needs to tell us ... You can't ask members [of Congress], 'Do you want to subpoena this guy?' He might be this, he might be that."

=== Rudy Giuliani ===
Since at least May 2019, Giuliani has been pushing for Ukrainian President Volodymyr Zelenskyy, the newly elected president of Ukraine, to investigate Burisma, as well as to check if there were any irregularities in the Ukrainian investigation of Paul Manafort. On May 7, Zelenskyy and a group of his advisors had a three-hour meeting to discuss how to respond to Trump and Giuliani's pressure and how to avoid becoming involved in domestic American politics. Giuliani said the investigations he sought would be beneficial to President Trump, his client, and that his efforts had Trump's full support. Giuliani's efforts began as an attempt to provide cover for Trump to pardon Manafort, who had been convicted of eight felony counts in August 2018.

On May 10, Giuliani canceled a scheduled trip to Ukraine where he had intended to urge president-elect Zelenskyy to pursue inquiries into Hunter Biden, as well as whether Democrats colluded with Ukrainians to release information about Manafort. Giuliani claimed he has sworn statements from five Ukrainians stating they were brought into the Obama White House in January 2016 and told to "go dig up dirt on Trump and Manafort", although he has not produced evidence for the claim. Giuliani asserted he cancelled the trip because he had been "set up" by Ukrainians who objected to his efforts, and blamed Democrats for trying to "spin" the trip. Giuliani met with Ukrainian officials to press for an investigation in June 2019 and August 2019.

As early as May 2019, as State Department officials planned to meet with Zelenskyy, Trump told them to circumvent official channels for planning this meeting and instead to work with Giuliani. In July 2019, days before Trump made his phone call to Zelenskyy, Giuliani participated in a 40-minute phone call with U.S. diplomat Kurt Volker and Andriy Yermak, a senior adviser to Zelenskyy. On this call, Giuliani said that if Zelenskyy were to publicly announce an investigation into Biden, it would help Zelenskyy have "a much better relationship" with Trump.

Responding to a motion by the liberal watchdog group American Oversight, on October 23 a federal judge gave the State Department 30 days to release Ukraine-related records, including communications between Secretary of State Mike Pompeo and Rudy Giuliani. On November 22, the State Department released internal emails and documents that bolstered Gordon Sondland's congressional testimony that Pompeo participated in Giuliani's activities relating to Ukraine. The documents also showed the State Department had deliberately deceived Congress about the rationale for Yovanovitch's removal as ambassador.

During his call with Zelenskyy, Trump said, "I will ask [Giuliani] to call you along with the attorney general. Rudy very much knows what's happening and he is a very capable guy. If you could speak to him that would be great." In November, Trump denied directing Giuliani to go to Ukraine, but days after his impeachment acquittal acknowledged that he had. Giuliani had asserted in September that "everything I did was to defend my client."

=== Naftogaz ===
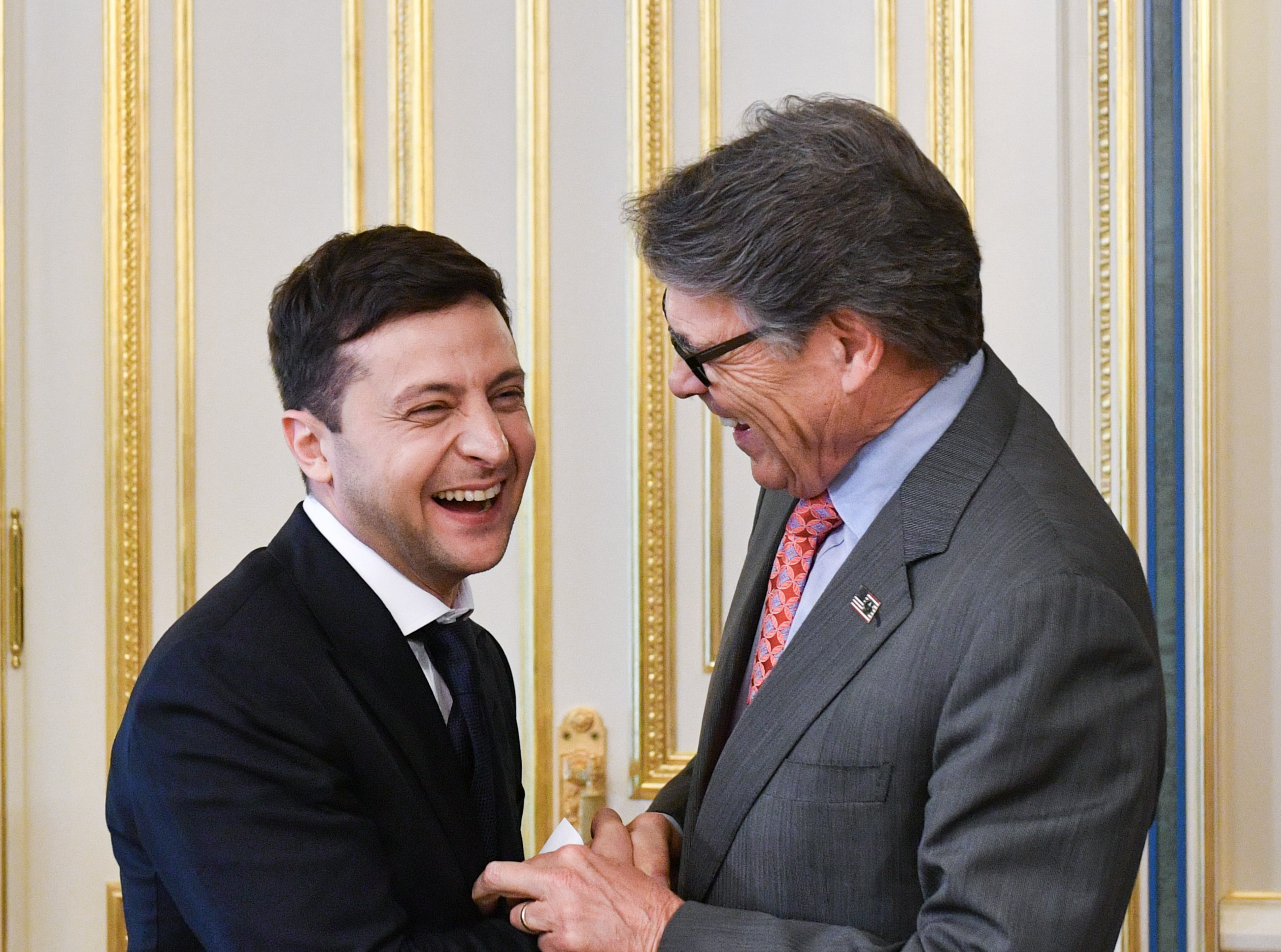
Former Secretary of Energy Rick Perry (R) with Zelenskyy (L) at Zelenskyy's inauguration, May 2019

Since March 2019, while Giuliani was pressing the Ukrainian administration to investigate the Bidens, a group of businessmen and Republican donors used their ties to Trump and Giuliani to try to replace the leadership of Ukrainian state-owned oil and gas company Naftogaz. The group sought to have Naftogaz contracts granted to businesses owned by allies of Trump, but this effort hit a setback when Volodymyr Zelenskyy won the 2019 Ukrainian presidential election. During a state visit for President Zelenskyy's inauguration in May, former Secretary of Energy Rick Perry reportedly pressured President Zelenskyy to fire members of the Naftogaz supervisory board, but Perry denied this, stating in a press conference on October 7: "That was a totally dreamed-up story". On October 10, Perry was issued a subpoena by the House Intelligence Committee, the House Oversight Committee, and the House Foreign Affairs Committee, partially concerning his interactions with Naftogaz.

The Wall Street Journal reported that Perry planned to have Amos Hochstein, a former Obama administration official, replaced as a member of the board at Naftogaz with someone aligned with Republican interests. Perry denied the reports.

=== Dmytry Firtash ===
Dmytry Firtash is a Ukrainian oligarch who is prominent in the natural gas sector. In 2017, the Justice Department characterized him as being an "upper echelon (associate) of Russian organized crime". Living in Vienna, Austria, for five years he has been fighting extradition to the U.S. on bribery and racketeering charges, and has been seeking to have the charges dropped. Firtash's attorneys obtained a September statement from Viktor Shokin, the former Ukrainian prosecutor general who was forced out under pressure from multiple countries and non-governmental organizations, as conveyed to Ukraine by Joe Biden. Shokin asserted in the statement that Biden actually had him fired because he refused to stop his investigation into Burisma. Giuliani, who asserts he has "nothing to do with" and has "never met or talked to" Firtash, has promoted the statement in television appearances as purported evidence of wrongdoing by the Bidens. Giuliani told CNN he met with a Firtash attorney for two hours in New York City at the time he was seeking information about the Bidens.

Firtash is represented by Trump and Giuliani associates Joseph diGenova and his wife Victoria Toensing, having hired them on Lev Parnas's recommendation. The New York Times reported in November that Giuliani had directed Parnas to approach Firtash with the recommendation, with the proposition that Firtash could help to provide compromising information on Biden, which Parnas's attorney described was "part of any potential resolution to [Firtash's] extradition matter". Shokin's statement notes that it was prepared "at the request of lawyers acting for Dmitry Firtash". Bloomberg News reported on October 18 that during the summer of 2019 Firtash associates began attempting to dig up dirt on the Bidens in an effort to solicit Giuliani's assistance with Firtash's legal matters, as well as hiring diGenova and Toensing in July. Bloomberg News also reported that its sources told them Giuliani's high-profile publicity of the Shokin statement had greatly reduced the chances of the Justice Department dropping the charges against Firtash, as it would appear to be a political quid pro quo.

Later that day, The New York Times reported that weeks earlier, before his associates Lev Parnas and Igor Fruman were indicted, Giuliani met with officials with the criminal and fraud divisions of the Justice Department regarding what Giuliani characterized as a "very, very sensitive" foreign bribery case involving a client of his. Barr also attended the meeting. The Times did not name whom the case involved, but shortly after publication of the story Giuliani told a reporter it was not Firtash. Two days later, the Justice Department stated its officials would not have met with Giuliani had they known his associates were under investigation by the SDNY. diGenova has said he has known attorney general Bill Barr for thirty years, as they both worked in the Reagan Justice Department. The Washington Post reported on October 22 that after they began representing Firtash, Toensing and diGenova secured a rare face-to-face meeting with Barr to argue the Firtash charges should be dropped. Prior to that mid-August meeting, Barr had been briefed in detail on the initial whistleblower complaint within the CIA that had been forwarded to the Justice Department, as well as on Giuliani's activities in Ukraine. Barr declined to intervene in the Firtash case.

Firtash made his fortune brokering Ukrainian imports of natural gas from the Russian firm Gazprom. As vice president, Joe Biden had urged the Ukrainian government to eliminate middlemen such as Firtash from the country's natural gas industry, and to reduce the country's reliance on imports of Russian natural gas. Firtash denied involvement in collecting or financing damaging information on the Bidens.

=== Kash Patel ===
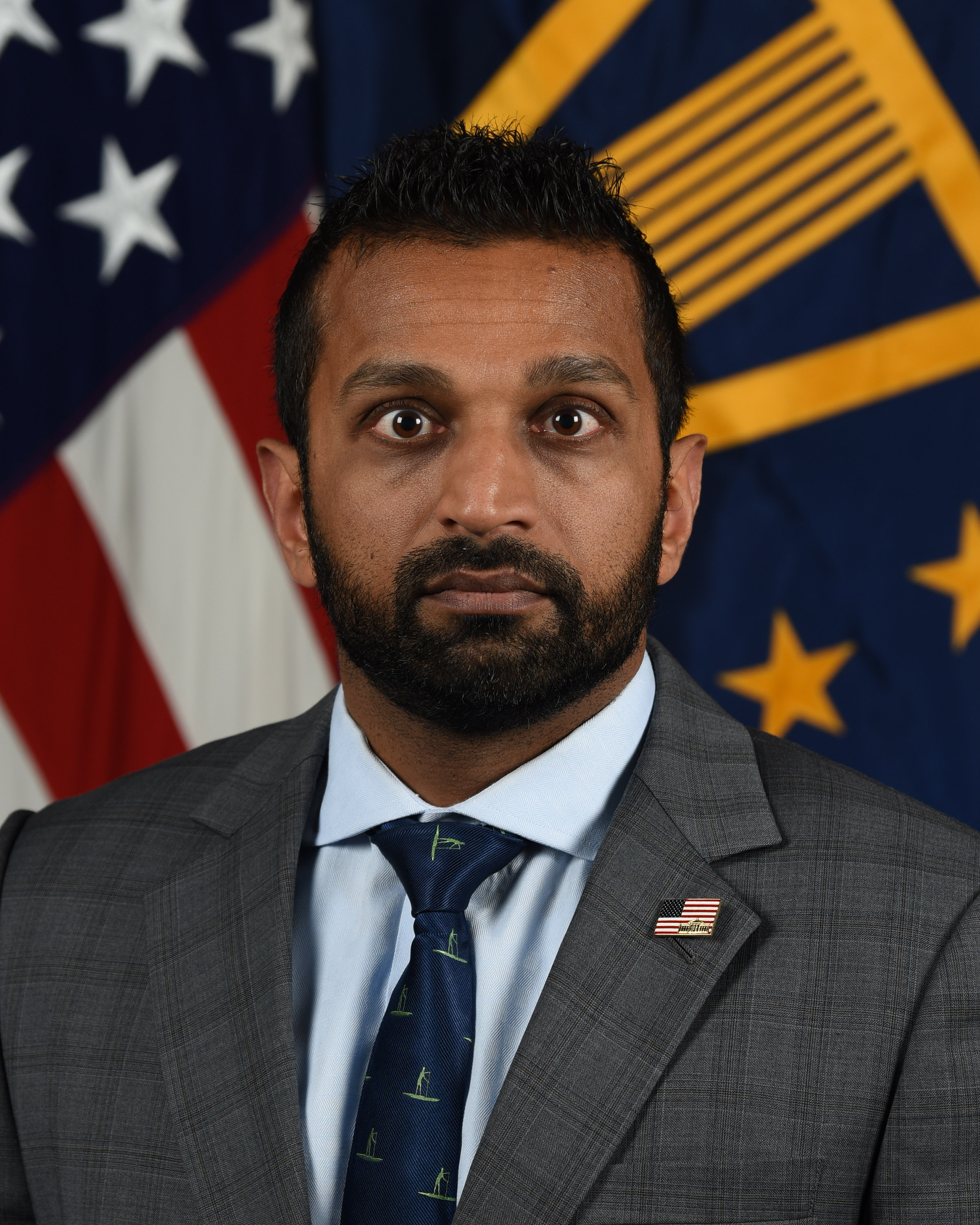
Chief of Staff to the Secretary of Defense Kash Patel poses for his official portrait at the Pentagon on November 17, 2020.

Kash Patel served as a national security aide for the House Intelligence Committee under Representative Devin Nunes (R-CA) during the first years of the Trump administration. Patel was a primary author of the Nunes memo. Released in February 2018, the memo established errors in the FBI's FISA warrant application for Trump campaign advisor Carter Page during the FBI's Russia investigation, including reliance on the Steele dossier. As an aide to Nunes, Patel also investigated the theory that Ukrainians were promulgating information about Russian interference in the 2016 United States elections.

In July 2019, Patel was appointed senior director of the counterterrorism directorate at the National Security Council. Fiona Hill, the NSC's senior director for European and Russian affairs, testified to impeachment investigators that she was concerned Patel "was improperly becoming involved in Ukraine policy and was sending information to Mr. Trump." Hill stated that Trump had referred to Patel as one of his Ukraine experts. Diplomats Gordon Sondland and George Kent testified they did not encounter Patel in the course of their Ukraine work.

On December 3, 2019, the House Intelligence Committee's report included phone records, acquired via subpoenas to AT&T and/or Verizon Wireless, showing a 25-minute phone call between Patel and Giuliani on May 10, 2019. The call occurred after Giuliani and Patel attempted to call each other for several hours, and less than an hour after a call between Giuliani and Kurt Volker. Five minutes after the call between Giuliani and Patel, an unidentified "-1" phone number called Giuliani for over 17 minutes, after which Giuliani called his associate Lev Parnas for approximately 12 minutes. In a statement to CBS News on December 4, Patel denied being part of any Ukraine back-channel, saying he was "never a back channel to President Trump on Ukraine matters, at all, ever," and that his call with Giuliani was "personal."

After Richard Grenell was named acting director of national intelligence in February 2020, Patel was added as a senior adviser on February 20.

Following the termination of Secretary Mark Esper in November 2020, Patel became the chief of staff for acting defense secretary Christopher C. Miller.

== Campaign against Marie Yovanovitch ==
As early as April 2018, Rudy Giuliani and his associates Lev Parnas and Igor Fruman had apparently decided to assist President Trump's re-election efforts and they identified the U.S. ambassador to Ukraine Marie Yovanovitch as being a difficulty. Yovanovitch had spent her thirty-year career working as a diplomat and was announced as the nominee for U.S. ambassador to Ukraine on May 18, 2016, to replace Geoff Pyatt. Yovanovitch was respected within the national security community for her efforts to encourage Ukraine to tackle corruption, and during her tenure had sought to strengthen the Ukrainian National Anti-Corruption Bureau, which had been created to bolster efforts to fight corruption in Ukraine.

As U.S. ambassador to Ukraine, Yovanovitch became the target of a conspiracy-driven smear campaign. Allegations against her were then made by Trump's personal attorney Giuliani, as well as conservative commentator John Solomon of The Hill and Ukraine's then-top prosecutor, Yuri Lutsenko, who accused her of being part of a conspiracy involving anti-corruption probes in Ukraine and efforts by the Trump administration to investigate ties between Ukrainian officials and the Hillary Clinton 2016 presidential campaign. Lutsenko, who has been accused by Ukrainian civil society organizations of corruption, claimed that Yovanovitch, an Obama administration appointee, had interfered in Ukrainian politics, had given him a "do-not-prosecute" list and was interfering in his ability to combat corruption in Ukraine. The U.S. State Department said that Lutsenko's allegations against Yovanovitch were "an outright fabrication" and indicated that they were a "classic disinformation campaign." Lutsenko subsequently recanted his claims of a "do-not-prosecute" list.

In testimony before the House Intelligence Committee, George Kent, the deputy assistant secretary for the State Department's Bureau of European and Eurasian Affairs, described the narratives about Ukraine told by Solomon and right-wing Fox News personalities Sean Hannity and Laura Ingraham as "entirely made up in full cloth". Their information was based on Solomon's interview(s) with a drunken Yuriy Lutsenko, the corrupt former Ukrainian prosecutor. Solomon's stories were nonetheless amplified by President Trump, his son Donald Trump Jr., Giuliani, Solomon, and conservative media outlets. Ukrainians who opposed Yovanovitch were also sources for Giuliani, who "was on a months-long search for political dirt in Ukraine to help President Trump." Giuliani confirmed in a November 2019 interview that he believed he "needed Yovanovitch out of the way" because she was going to make his investigations difficult.

On April 24, 2019, after complaints from Giuliani and other Trump allies that Yovanovitch was undermining and obstructing Trump's efforts to persuade Ukraine to investigate former vice president and 2020 presidential election candidate Joe Biden, Trump ordered Yovanovitch's recall. She returned to Washington, D.C., on April 25, with her recall becoming public knowledge on May 7, and her mission as ambassador being terminated on May 20, 2019. In a July 25, 2019, phone call with Ukrainian president Volodymyr Zelenskyy (the contents of which became public on September 25, 2019), Trump pressured the Ukrainian government to investigate Biden and disparaged Yovanovitch to his foreign counterpart, calling her "bad news".

Documents to the House Intelligence Committee provided by Lev Parnas outlined text exchanges in which Lutsenko pushed for the ouster of Yovanovitch and in return offered to provide damaging information on Joe Biden. In Russian-language messages, Lutsenko told Parnas that Yovanovitch—referred to as "madam"—should be ousted before he would make helpful public statements; for example, in a March 22, 2019 WhatsApp message to Parnas, Lutsenko wrote, "It's just that if you don't make a decision about Madam—you are calling into question all my declarations. Including about B." It is thought that Lutsenko targeted Yovanovitch due to her anti-corruption efforts in Ukraine. One week before an April 1, 2019, conference on anti-corruption, Parnas exchanged encrypted WhatsApp text messages with Robert F. Hyde that indicated the ambassador was under surveillance and that her security was at risk. Hyde claimed he had merely forwarded messages received from a Belgian citizen named Anthony de Caluwe. After the House Intelligence Committee released the text messages, de Caluwe initially denied any involvement, but then reversed himself, saying that he had in fact sent the messages to Hyde but that the messages were a joke and "just a part of a ridiculous banter."

An audio tape from April 2018, recorded at a private dinner between Trump and top donors and made public by ABC News in January 2020, captures Trump demanding Yovanovitch's removal, saying: "Get rid of her! Get her out tomorrow. I don't care. Get her out tomorrow. Take her out. Okay? Do it." The recording appeared to corroborate Parnas's account that he had told Trump that night that Yovanovitch was working against him.

Yovanovitch's abrupt ouster shocked and outraged career State Department diplomats. Acting Assistant Secretary of State for European and Eurasian Affairs Philip Reeker, the chief diplomat for U.S. policy for Europe, testified that he had urged top State Department officials David Hale and T. Ulrich Brechbuhl, to issue a statement expressing strong support for Yovanovitch, but that top State Department leadership rejected this proposal. Former senior U.S. diplomats Philip H. Gordon and Daniel Fried, who served as assistant secretaries of state for European and Eurasian Affairs and as National Security Council staffers under presidents of both parties, praised Yovanovitch and condemned Trump's "egregious mistreatment of one of the country's most distinguished ambassadors," writing that this had demoralized the U.S. diplomatic corps and undermined U.S. foreign policy. The American Foreign Service Association and American Academy of Diplomacy, representing members of the U.S. diplomatic corps, expressed alarm at Trump's disparagement of Yovanovitch in his call with Zelenskyy. Michael McKinley, a career foreign service officer who served as ambassador to four countries and had been chief adviser to Secretary of State Mike Pompeo, resigned in October 2019 in protest of Trump's attacks against Yovanovitch and "the State Department's unwillingness to protect career diplomats from politically motivated pressure." Yovanovitch's ouster became one of the issues explored in the House of Representatives impeachment inquiry against Trump; her recall was termed "a political hit job" by Democratic members of Congress. Trump subsequently said she was "no angel" and falsely claimed that Yovanovitch had refused to hang his portrait.

== Communications with Ukrainian officials ==
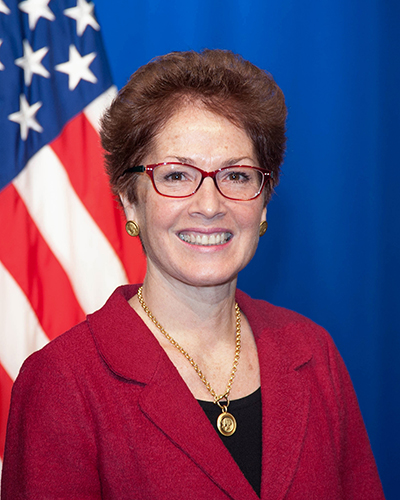
Marie Yovanovitch, former U.S. Ambassador to Ukraine, was removed from her post because of her anti-corruption efforts in Ukraine, and because she disagreed with the shadow diplomacy taking place under Giuliani and President Trump.

Letter from the chairs of the House Committees on Intelligence, Oversight and Reform, and Foreign Affairs, including copies of text-message conversations involving Volker, Sondland, and others

On September 20, 2019, The Washington Post reported that Trump had in a July 25 phone conversation repeatedly pressed Ukrainian president Zelenskyy to investigate matters relating to Hunter Biden. The New York Times reported that Trump told Zelenskyy to speak to Giuliani, and according to The Wall Street Journal, he urged Zelenskyy "about eight times" to work with Giuliani and investigate Biden's son. On September 22, Trump acknowledged he had discussed Joe Biden during the call with Zelenskyy, and that he had said: "We don't want our people like Vice President Biden and his son creating [sic] to the corruption already in the Ukraine. [sic]" As of October 2019, there has been no evidence produced of any of the alleged wrongdoing by the Bidens.

Mike Pompeo and Keith Kellogg listened in on the call and Pence received a transcript. Others on the line included Tim Morrison, the National Security Council's senior director for Europe and Russia; Robert Blair, an aide to Mick Mulvaney; and Alexander Vindman, a Ukraine expert for the NSC.

Days before Trump's July 25 call with Zelenskyy, Giuliani spoke on the phone with Zelenskyy aide Andriy Yermak about a Biden investigation, as well as a prospective White House meeting between Zelenskyy and Trump that was sought by Ukrainian officials. According to Zelenskyy's advisor Serhiy Leshchenko, Trump was willing to have a phone conversation with Zelenskyy only on the precondition that they discuss the possibility of investigating the Biden family. Leshchenko later sought to backtrack his comments, saying he did not know if officials had viewed discussing Biden as a precondition for a meeting.

Text messages given to Congress by special envoy to Ukraine Kurt Volker in October suggest that Zelenskyy's aide Yermak was told that Zelenskyy would be invited for a White House visit only if he promised to carry out the requested investigations. On July 25, just before Trump's phone call, Volker texted to Yermak: "heard from White House—assuming President Z convinces trump he will investigate / 'get to the bottom of what happened' in 2016, we will nail down date for visit to Washington."

On September 25, the administration released the White House's five-page, declassified memorandum of the July 25 phone call between Trump and Zelenskyy. (Note: The document, titled a "Memorandum of Telephone Conversation" includes a notation stating that it was "not a verbatim transcript" and was prepared based on "notes and recollections of Situation Room duty officers" and National Security Council staff. Senior administration officials said voice recognition software was also used in preparing the memorandum. Some sources describe the document as a "rough transcript".) In the call, Trump pressed for an investigation into the Bidens and CrowdStrike, saying: "I would like to have the [U.S.] attorney general call you or your people and I would like you to get to the bottom of it." Trump falsely told Zelenskyy "Biden went around bragging that he stopped the prosecution" of his son, Hunter; Biden did not stop any prosecution, did not brag about doing so, and there is no evidence his son was ever under investigation.

Trump also presented Giuliani as a key U.S. contact for Ukraine, although Giuliani holds no official U.S. government position. Trump said three times that he would ask both Attorney General Barr and Giuliani to call Zelenskyy, and added: "So whatever you can do with the attorney general would be great." In response, Zelenskyy said his candidate for Ukraine's chief prosecutor "will look into the situation, specifically to the company that you mentioned in this issue". After Zelenskyy said this, Trump offered to meet with Zelenskyy at the White House. On the same call with Zelenskyy, Trump espoused the conspiracy theory that Hillary Clinton's email server was in Ukraine; criticized the U.S.'s European allies (in particular Germany), and disparaged the former U.S. ambassador to Ukraine, Marie Yovanovitch, a career U.S. diplomat whom the Trump administration had abruptly recalled two months earlier. Trump told Zelenskyy that Yovanovitch was "going to go through some things".

During the conversation, Zelenskyy mentioned that on his last visit to the U.S., he had stayed in Trump Tower. Ethics advocacy groups described this comment as an attempt to curry favor.

Shortly after the conversation, White House aides began asking one another whether they should alert other senior officials who had not participated. The first whistleblower described one White House official as being "visibly shaken by what had transpired". In a July 26 memo, the whistleblower reported, "The official stated that there was already a conversation underway with White House lawyers about how to handle the discussion because, in the official's view, the president had clearly committed a criminal act by urging a foreign power to investigate a U.S. person for the purposes of advancing his own re-election bid in 2020."

During the period prior to and immediately after the July 25 call, at least four national security officials warned National Security Council legal adviser John Eisenberg that the Trump administration was attempting to pressure Ukraine for political purposes.

Days after the Trump call, Giuliani met with Yermak in Madrid. Giuliani said on September 23 that the State Department had asked him to "go on a mission for them" to speak with Yermak. The State Department had said on August 22 that its Ukraine envoy Volker had connected the men, but that Giuliani was acting as a private citizen and Trump attorney, although he briefed the State Department after the trip. Giuliani said he told Yermak, "Your country owes it to us and to your country to find out what really happened." Yermak said he was not clear if Giuliani was representing Trump, but Giuliani said he was not, and the White House referred questions about Giuliani's role to the State Department, which did not respond. Appearing on television on September 19, Giuliani first denied he had asked Ukrainian officials to investigate Joe Biden, but moments later said, "Of course I did." Former prosecutor Yuri Lutsenko told the Los Angeles Times Giuliani had repeatedly demanded that the Ukrainians investigate the Biden family. "I told him I could not start an investigation just for the interests of an American official," Lutsenko informed the Times.

In August, Volker and American ambassador to the EU Gordon Sondland drafted a statement they wanted Zelenskyy to read publicly that would commit Ukraine to investigate Burisma and the conspiracy theory that Ukraine interfered with the 2016 election to benefit Hillary Clinton. However, Zelenskyy never made the statement. Volker also provided to congressional investigators a September text message exchange between Sondland, a major Trump donor and political appointee, and Bill Taylor, a career diplomat who was the senior official at the Ukrainian embassy after the recall of Ambassador Yovanovitch. In the messages, Taylor wrote: "I think it's crazy to withhold security assistance for help with a political campaign." Four hours later, after speaking with Trump, Sondland responded: "Bill, I believe you are incorrect about President Trump's intentions. The president has been crystal clear: no quid pro quos of any kind." He then suggested they continue discussing the matter by phone rather than text.

The Washington Post reported on October 12 that Sondland would tell congressional investigators the following week that he had relayed Trump's assertion of no quid pro quo, but he did not know if it was actually true. NBC News reported the night before Sondland's testimony that he told Ukrainian officials visiting the White House that a Trump–Zelenskyy meeting was conditioned on Ukraine opening an investigation, and discussed Burisma with them. The Wall Street Journal reported in November 2019 that prior to the Trump–Zelenskyy call, Sondland had kept several administration officials apprised via email of his efforts to persuade Ukraine to open investigations.

American embassy officials in Kyiv repeatedly expressed concerns about Giuliani's meetings, and during closed-door congressional testimony on October 4, Volker reportedly said he had warned Giuliani that Ukrainian political figures were giving him untrustworthy information about the Bidens. He also testified that Joe Biden was a "man of integrity", saying: "I have known former vice president Biden for 24 years, and the suggestion that he would be influenced in his duties as vice president by money for his son simply has no credibility to me. I know him as a man of integrity and dedication to our country."

=== Memorandum record of the July 25 phone call ===
The first whistleblower's report said that "senior White House officials had intervened to 'lock down' all records of the phone call", an act that indicated those officials "understood the gravity of what had transpired". They performed the "lock down" by placing the record of the call on a top-secret server intended for the most highly classified material, under the direction of John Eisenberg. It was later confirmed that on orders from National Security Council attorneys, the call with Ukraine was moved from TNet, the regular NSC computer system, to the top-secret codeword NICE system, reserved for closely guarded secrets. On September 27, it was reported that records of calls with the leaders of Saudi Arabia and Russia had also been stored on NICE.

On September 27, the White House acknowledged that a record of the call between Trump and Zelenskyy was sealed in a highly classified system, as per the advice of National Security Council lawyers.

On the same day, it was reported that the records of Trump's Oval Office meeting with Russian officials in May 2017 had been unusually closely held, with distribution limited to a few officials. White House advisor Kellyanne Conway said the procedure for handling records of Trump's calls with world leaders had been tightened early in 2017 because of leaks to the press about his conversations with the president of Mexico and the prime minister of Australia.

It was subsequently revealed that this placement on the top-secret server was made for political rather than for national security reasons, which are the only valid reasons to use such a server, and that it happened after the White House's top Ukraine adviser, Alexander Vindman, told White House lawyer John Eisenberg that "what the president did was wrong". This conversation occurred immediately after Trump's phone call with Zelenskyy, and, according to people familiar with Vindman's account, it was Eisenberg who proposed this placement and restriction of access to the "Memorandum of Telephone Conversation" (i.e., the "rough transcript" of the phone call).

On October 2, Trump falsely asserted that the publicly released memorandum was "an exact word-for-word transcript of the conversation". Analysts noted that its use of ellipses to denote omitted material was uncommon for government transcripts, and that it was surprisingly brief for a thirty-minute conversation, even allowing for the time delays due to the use of an interpreter. During his October 29 testimony, European Affairs Lt. Col Alexander Vindman said the memorandum of the call released by the White House omitted crucial words and phrases, including Trump asserting that recordings exist of Joe Biden discussing Ukraine corruption, which Trump stated in the third set of ellipses in the released memorandum. Vindman said he tried but failed to restore the omitted text. A senior White House official had asserted when the Memorandum was released that the ellipses "do not indicate missing words or phrases", but rather "a trailing off of a voice or pause". The New York Times states that "There is no [audio] recording of the July 25 call by the American side."

Both attorney general Bill Barr and White House counsel Pat Cipollone had recommended Trump publicly release the memorandum, asserting it showed the president did nothing wrong. During ensuing days, Trump and his allies strongly encouraged the public to read the "transcript", even as the consensus view of legal analysts was that the memorandum implicated rather than exonerated the president. Chief of Staff Mick Mulvaney advised Trump that releasing the memorandum had been a mistake, causing the president to become irked by the advice Barr had given him.

=== Withholding of Ukrainian military aid ===
The U.S. Congress had mandated increased military aid to Ukraine over the period of Trump's presidency. Congress appropriated $400 million in military aid to Ukraine for fiscal year 2019, to be used to spend on weapons and other equipment as well as programs to assist the Ukrainian military in combating threats from Putin's Russia and Russian-backed separatists of the self-proclaimed separatist entities in eastern Ukraine. The administration notified Congress in February 2019 and May 2019 that it intended to release this aid to Ukraine, with the Defense Department certifying that Ukraine had made sufficient progress in fighting corruption. Despite the notifications to Congress, in June 2019, the Trump administration placed military aid to Ukraine on hold. The date of the hold was originally reported as mid-July. The Washington Post reported on September 23 that at least a week before his July 25 call with Zelenskyy, Trump directed his acting chief of staff Mick Mulvaney to withhold $400 million in military aid to Ukraine. This directive was conveyed by the Office of Management and Budget to the State Department and Pentagon, stating Trump had concerns about whether the money should be spent, with instructions to tell lawmakers the funds were being delayed due to an "interagency process". The New York Times reported that "high-level Ukrainian officials" were aware that the Trump administration had purposely frozen the military aid by the first week of August 2019, and they were told to contact Mick Mulvaney to resolve the matter.

During an October 17 press conference, White House acting chief of staff Mick Mulvaney said he "was involved with the process" of the freezing of military aid. Mulvaney gave his account of why Trump decided to hold back military aid to Ukraine. One, Trump felt the other European countries were not doing enough. Two, Trump felt Ukraine was a "corrupt place" which included having "corruption related to the DNC server" with regard to "what happened in 2016". As a result, reporter Jonathan Karl told Mulvaney "what you just described is a quid pro quo. It is: 'Funding will not flow unless the investigation into the Democratic server happens as well.'" Mulvaney replied to Karl: "We do that all the time with foreign policy ... Get over it. There's going to be political influence in foreign policy." Later in the press conference, Mulvaney quoted a third reason on why military aid was frozen—they had yet to cooperate with the Justice Department's investigation of potential interference by Ukraine in the 2016 U.S. presidential election.

After media reports of Mulvaney's comments circulated, Republicans joined Trump's aides and legal counsel in distancing themselves from his remarks. A senior official in the Justice Department stated: "If the White House was withholding aid from Ukraine with regard to any investigation by the Justice Department, that's news to us." Hours later on the same day where he had issued the press conference, Mulvaney criticized the media for their coverage of his comments and denied his earlier remarks, saying that there was "no quid pro quo" regarding the withholding of aid and requests to investigate the Democrats' behavior during the 2016 election.

In the July 25 call with Trump, Zelenskyy thanked Trump for the U.S.'s "great support in the area of defense", an apparent reference to military aid, and expressed an interest in acquiring more missiles. Trump replied, "I would like you to do us a favor though," suggesting an investigation into CrowdStrike, an American cybersecurity firm that investigated the cyberattacks against the Democratic National Committee in 2015 and 2016. CrowdStrike was one of three firms whose analysis assisted the U.S. intelligence community in determining that Russian intelligence was responsible for the DNC hack. Trump also asked Zelenskyy to investigate Joe Biden and his son. Ukraine relies on extensive American military aid to fight Russian-backed separatists in the Donbas, and the Trump administration's suspension of the congressionally-mandated aid was reportedly a shock to Ukrainian government officials who found out about it only "much later, and then through nonofficial channels". Trump's addition of the word "though" has been interpreted as a condition made by Trump that his decisions would be based on Ukraine's compliance with his requests.

On September 9, on hearing about the whistleblower complaint, three Democratic-controlled House committees—the Committee on Foreign Affairs, the Permanent Select Committee on Intelligence, and the Committee on Oversight and Reform—announced they would investigate whether Trump and Giuliani attempted to coerce Ukraine into investigating the Bidens by withholding the military aid. On September 11, the Trump administration released the aid.

In a September 20 tweet, Giuliani appeared to confirm suspicion that there was a connection between the withholding of military assistance funds and the investigation he and Trump wanted Ukraine to undertake. He said: "The reality is that the President of the United States, whoever he is, has every right to tell the president of another country you better straighten out the corruption in your country if you want me to give you a lot of money. If you're so damn corrupt that you can't investigate allegations—our money is going to get squandered." Trump himself appeared to make a similar connection on September 23, telling reporters: "We want to make sure that country is honest. It's very important to talk about corruption. If you don't talk about corruption, why would you give money to a country that you think is corrupt?" Trump later denied pressuring Ukraine.

While the aid was restored in time to prevent any military setbacks, Trump's withholding of military aid took a heavy psychological toll on the Ukraine soldiers. Trump has offered inconsistent justifications for withholding the aid. He originally said that the aid was withheld due to "corruption" in the country and that the topic of conversation with Volodymyr Zelenskyy was about "the fact that we don't want our people, like vice-president Biden and his son, [adding] to the corruption already in the Ukraine". He later disputed his original statement and said the aid was initially held back due to a lack of similar contribution from other European nations.

Republican senator Ron Johnson told The Wall Street Journal in October that American ambassador Gordon Sondland told him in August that military aid to Ukraine was linked to the desire of Trump and his allies for the Ukrainian government to investigate matters related to the 2016 American elections. Sondland told a State department diplomat in September via text message that there was no quid pro quo. On October 12, however, The Washington Post reported that, according to a person familiar with Sondland's testimony, Sondland plans to testify to Congress that the content of that text message "was relayed to him directly by President Trump in a phone call" and that he did not know if the claim denying quid pro quo was actually true.

The Wall Street Journal reported on October 10 that career civil servants at the Office of Management and Budget were concerned about the legality of freezing the aid funds, and that the White House granted a political appointee, Michael Duffey, the authority to keep the aid on hold. Partially redacted OMB emails released to the Center for Public Integrity on December 20 showed that Duffey initiated action to freeze the Ukrainian aid about 90 minutes after the July 25 Trump–Zelenskyy call, writing to OMB and Pentagon officials, "given the sensitive nature of the request, I appreciate your keeping that information closely held to those who need to know to execute direction." Unredacted versions of the emails subsequently acquired by Just Security showed that the Pentagon repeatedly pushed back against the hold, citing legal concerns, but Duffey stated, "clear direction from POTUS to continue to hold". Just Security reported that the original redactions had been made by the Justice Department. Another series of heavily redacted emails released on January 21, 2020, showed that the OMB was laying the groundwork to freeze the Ukraine aid on the night of July 24, prior to the July 25 Trump–Zelenskyy call. An enclosed "Ukraine Prep Memo" was redacted in its entirety.

On January 16, 2020, the Government Accountability Office (GAO), a non-partisan watchdog agency, concluded that the White House broke federal law by withholding of Congress-approved military aid to Ukraine. The agency concluded that the Impoundment Control Act of 1974 had been violated because Congress' legislated policy had been supplanted by President Trump's own policy. The agency also concluded that the withholding "was not a programmatic delay", in spite of the Trump administration's claim that it was so.

As the second week of the Trump impeachment trial was set to begin in January 2020, The New York Times reported that Bolton wrote in his forthcoming book that the president had told him in August 2019 that he wanted to continue freezing the Ukraine aid until officials there pursued investigations into Democrats, including the Bidens.

=== Withholding of White House visit ===
In a May 2019 letter congratulating Zelenskyy on his election, Trump raised the possibility of a White House visit. However, during the next few months as Giuliani and some State Department officials pressed Zelenskyy to investigate Burisma and the 2016 election, a White House visit became one of the inducements offered or withheld depending on Zelenskyy's cooperation.

Bill Taylor, the United States' senior diplomatic official in Ukraine, testified in a congressional hearing that he learned in mid-July 2019 that a potential White House meeting between Trump and Zelenskyy "was conditioned on the investigations of Burisma and alleged Ukrainian interference in the 2016 U.S. elections".

Gordon Sondland, the U.S. ambassador to the European Union who became Trump's primary connection to Ukraine, testified that Trump had told him he was "skeptical that Ukraine was serious about reforms and anti-corruption" and directed him to speak to Giuliani about his concerns. Sondland began working with Giuliani and conveyed the message about investigations to the Ukrainians. In August, Sondland texted that the White House visit would be scheduled just as soon as Zelenskyy confirmed that he would issue a public statement about investigations into the Bidens and the 2016 election. In his November 20 testimony before the impeachment hearings, Sondland testified that the White House visit was conditioned on a public Ukrainian announcement of investigation into Burisma and the 2016 election, which he described as a quid pro quo.

In testimony before congressional committees, the National Security Council's head of European affairs, Lieutenant Colonel Alexander Vindman, testified that Sondland had told Ukrainian officials in his presence that they would have to launch investigations into the Bidens in order to get a meeting with Trump. He said Sondland indicated that "everything"—including the military aid and the White House visit—was on the table pending Zelenskyy's public announcement of such an investigation.

== Whistleblower complaints ==
=== First whistleblower complaint ===
==== Submission of complaint and withholding from Congress ====
A redacted version of the whistleblower complaint

On August 12, 2019, an unnamed CIA officer filed a whistleblower complaint with Michael Atkinson, the inspector general of the Intelligence Community (ICIG), under the provisions of the Intelligence Community Whistleblower Protection Act (ICWPA). Atkinson looked into the complaint and interviewed several government officials whom the whistleblower identified as having information to substantiate his claims. On August 26, having found the complaint to be both "credible" and "of urgent concern" (as defined by the ICWPA), and noting the "subject matter expertise" of the whistleblower, Atkinson transmitted the complaint to Joseph Maguire, the acting director of national intelligence (DNI). Prior to the whistleblower filing the formal ICIG complaint, the individual notified the CIA of his/her concerns, which were then relayed to the White House and Justice Department. The New York Times reported in November that Trump was told of the whistleblower complaint in late August, before it was known by Congress and before the Ukraine aid was released.

Maguire withheld the complaint from congressional intelligence committees, citing the Justice Department's Office of Legal Counsel's rationale that the whistleblower complaint did not relate to an "intelligence activity within the responsibility and authority" of the acting DNI. Maguire also testified that the whistleblower "followed the law every step of the way". In an October 2019 letter, about 70 inspectors general from the Council of the Inspectors General on Integrity and Efficiency sharply criticized the Justice Department's decision to withhold the complaint from Congress, recommending the OLC memo be withdrawn or amended because it "effectively overruled the determination by the ICIG regarding an 'urgent concern' complaint" that the ICIG concluded was "credible and therefore needed to be transmitted to Congress".

External videos
- Maguire's testimony before the House Intelligence Committee, September 26, 2019, C-SPAN

Under ICWPA, the DNI "shall" within seven days of receipt forward the complaint to the Senate and House Intelligence Committees. Maguire did not do so, and the deadline passed on September 2. On September 9 Atkinson wrote to several lawmakers, telling them about the existence of the whistleblower report, which Maguire had not forwarded to Congress. On September 10, House Intelligence Committee (HPSCI) chairman Adam Schiff wrote to Maguire, asking why he had not provided it. According to Schiff, Maguire said he had been told to withhold it on direction from a "higher authority" because it involved an "issue of privileged communications". Schiff said he was also told "the complaint concerns conduct by someone outside of the Intelligence Community." The Trump administration withheld the complaint on the basis of the Justice Department's assertion that the complaint was not within the purview of the ICWPA. (Note: On September 3, 2019, the Justice Department's Office of Legal Counsel (OLC) issued a classified memorandum, written by the office's head, Steven A. Engel, stating that the acting DNI did not need to give the complaint to Congress because, in his view, the complaint was not related to "an intelligence activity" under the acting DNI's authority. Engel's letter said the whistleblower's complaint should instead be referred to the Justice Department. A declassified version of the OLC's memo was released on September 24, 2019.) On September 13, Schiff subpoenaed Maguire to appear before the HPSCI, and Maguire agreed to testify on September 26. The Washington Post reported that Maguire threatened to resign if the White House sought to constrain his testimony, although Maguire later denied he had contemplated resigning.

On September 18, The Washington Post broke the story of the whistleblower report, saying the complaint concerned a "promise" Trump had made during communication with an unnamed foreign leader. White House records showed Trump had made communications or interactions with five foreign leaders during the five weeks prior to the whistleblower complaint's filing. During a previously scheduled closed-door hearing before the HPSCI on September 19, Atkinson told lawmakers the complaint referred to a series of events, and that he disagreed with the position that the complaint lay outside the scope of the ICWPA, but declined to provide details. On September 19, The Washington Post reported that the complaint related to Ukraine.

After the ICIG found that the call was a possible violation of federal campaign finance laws, which prohibits the solicitation of foreign contributions, the ICIG referred the matter to the FBI, and the DNI referred the matter to the U.S. Department of Justice for a possible criminal investigation of Trump's actions. Courtney Simmons Elwood, general counsel for the CIA, became aware of the whistleblower's complaint through a colleague. A Justice Department official said the ICIG suspected the call could have broken federal law if Trump's request to the Ukrainian government to investigate a political opponent constituted the solicitation of campaign contribution from a foreign government. According to a Justice Department spokeswoman, the department's criminal division reviewed "the official record of the call". The Justice Department's determination to not launch an investigation took only weeks; the department did not conduct interviews or take steps beyond reviewing the call record. A senior Justice Department official told The Washington Post the Justice Department had determined Trump's conduct did not constitute the solicitation of a quantifiable "thing of value" subject to the campaign finance laws. The Justice Department's review looked into whether there was evidence of a campaign violation law, and did not look into possible violations of federal corruption statutes. Some legal experts said there seemed to be evidence warranting an investigation into both; for example, Richard L. Hasen, an election-law scholar, believes the provision of opposition research, e.g., valuable information about a political rival, could be considered a contribution in kind under campaign finance law.

==== Release and substance of the complaint ====
On September 24, 2019, the top Democrats of the House and Senate intelligence committees said an attorney for the whistleblower had contacted the committees about providing testimony. Members and staff of congressional intelligence committees were allowed to examine the whistleblower complaint on September 25. After the release of the whistleblower complaint to congressional committees, Republican senators Ben Sasse and Mitt Romney called the complaint contents "really troubling" and "troubling in the extreme", respectively. That same day, the complaint itself was declassified with "minimal redactions". The House Intelligence Committee released the declassified, redacted version of the complaint on September 26.

In the complaint, the whistleblower said Trump abused the presidency for personal gain and put national security in danger, and that White House officials engaged in a cover-up. The whistleblower wrote:

In the course of my official duties, I have received information from multiple U.S. government officials that the President of the United States is using the power of his office to solicit interference from a foreign country in the 2020 U.S. election. This interference includes, among other things, pressuring a foreign country to investigate one of the President's main domestic political rivals.

In addition to the July 25 phone call between Trump and the Ukrainian president Zelenskyy, the whistleblower alleged that Giuliani, Trump's personal attorney, had engaged in a campaign to pressure Ukrainian authorities to pursue Joe Biden, including in an August 2 meeting in Madrid between Giuliani and Zelenskyy aide as "a direct followup" to the July 25 call and contact with a number of other officials in Zelenskyy's government. These officials included Zelenskyy's Chief of Staff, Andriy Bohdan, and the then-acting head of the Security Service of Ukraine, Ivan Bakanov. The whistleblower further alleged in the complaint that White House officials had tried to limit access to the record of Trump's telephone conversation with Zelenskyy, writing:

In the days following the phone call, I learned from multiple U.S. officials that senior White House officials had intervened to "lock down" all records of the phone call, especially the word-for-word transcript of the call that was produced—as is customary—by the White House Situation Room. This set of actions underscored to me that White House officials understood the gravity of what had transpired in the call.

==== Confirmation ====
By the end of October the bulk of the whistleblower complaint had been confirmed by other sources, including the memorandum record of the July 25 call which the White House released, testimony before congressional committees, and independent reporting. According to a The New York Times editorial titled "Thanks, Whistle-Blower, Your Work Is Done", only one minor item reported in the whistleblower complaint has not yet been confirmed: that T. Ulrich Brechbuhl, the Counselor for the State Department, also listened to the call.

==== Identity ====
Trump has repeatedly called for the identity of the whistleblower to be revealed, as have some Republican congress members, particularly Senator Rand Paul, who blocked a Senate resolution reaffirming protection for whistleblowers, and has demanded that the media print the person's name. Around November 1, an alleged identity began to circulate on right-wing publications and social media. Major news outlets have refused to publish the rumored identity of the whistleblower, and Facebook and YouTube announced plans to delete all mentions of the name. Twitter is allowing posts containing the alleged whistleblower's name, and Donald Trump Jr. was criticized for publishing such posts on his account on November 6.

Publicly identifying the whistleblower's name may contravene provisions of the Inspector General Act of 1978, the Intelligence Authorization Act, the ICWPA, the Whistleblower Protection Act, and a Presidential Policy Directive dated 2012. Senator Rand Paul and Trump Jr. both argued that naming the whistleblower is not a crime, and Robert S. Litt, former general counsel for the National Intelligence Office, said that members of Congress would be "absolutely immune" from prosecution under the Speech and Debate Clause, although they could be subject to congressional sanctions.

Due to threats against him, the whistleblower spent several months guarded by the CIA's Security Protective Service, living in hotels and traveling with armed officers in an unmarked vehicle. The CIA observed that "violent messages surged each time the analyst was targeted in tweets or public remarks by the president," according to a The Washington Post report.

=== Second whistleblower complaint ===
A second whistleblower, also an intelligence official, came forward on October 5, 2019, with "first-hand knowledge of allegations" associated with the phone call between Trump and Zelenskyy, according to Mark Zaid, a lawyer on the team representing both whistleblowers. Zaid stated that the second whistleblower had been interviewed by the ICIG but had not at that time filed a written complaint. Nor, as of October 6, had the second whistleblower communicated with any committee in the House of Representatives.

As of October 6, it is not known whether this intelligence official is the same individual mentioned in a The New York Times report from October 4 about an intelligence official who was then weighing the possibility of filing an ICIG complaint and testifying before Congress.

== Subsequent developments ==
=== Involvement of Lev Parnas and Igor Fruman ===
Subpoena issued to John M. Dowd, regarding his clients Lev Parnas and Igor Fruman

Lev Parnas and Igor Fruman are associates of Rudy Giuliani who aided him in his politically-motivated investigation into Joe Biden. They had previously worked for Dmytry Firtash, a Ukrainian oligarch being indicted by the Justice Department and believed to be involved at high levels of Russian organized crime. Their attorney John Dowd, who previously represented Trump during the Mueller investigation, told Congress in October 2019 the men were assisting Giuliani in his work on behalf of Trump. Both are Soviet-born Florida real estate businessmen and naturalized American citizens.

The two were arrested on the evening of October 9, 2019, and charged with planning to direct funds from a foreign government "to U.S. politicians while trying to influence U.S.-Ukraine relations". They were arrested at Dulles International while trying to leave the U.S. en route to Vienna, Austria. Rudy Giuliani was also scheduled to fly to Vienna the following night. Their arrest, the first in the Trump–Ukraine scandal, was described as a "complex web of financial and political interactions linking diplomacy to alleged violations of campaign finance law". The head of the New York's FBI office described the investigation as "about corrupt behavior, deliberate lawbreaking". Parnas and Fruman both pleaded not guilty. Parnas's attorney said some evidence against his client could be subject to presidential executive privilege, as Giuliani had represented both Trump and Parnas.

The charges have also directly connected Parnas and Fruman to the campaign to oust the United States ambassador to Ukraine, Marie Yovanovitch, from her post and have her recalled. This occurred over many months. In 2018, the operation included Parnas and Fruman donating funds and pledging later additional money to an unnamed congressman, who was recruited for the "campaign to oust her". Some of the funds violated campaign limits. Parnas and Fruman were also charged with unlawful campaign contributions. Former congressional representative Pete Sessions (R-Texas) correlates with campaign finance filings, identifying him as the unnamed congressman. At the time, as the chairman of the influential House Rules Committee, he wrote a May 9, 2018, letter to Secretary of State Mike Pompeo "saying that Ms. Yovanovitch should be fired for privately expressing 'disdain' for the current administration". Earlier that day, Parnas and his business partner David Correia visited Sessions in his Capitol Hill office. Correia was arrested by the FBI at JFK International on October 16 on charges of using foreign money for political influence to advance a marijuana scheme.

In 2018, Parnas and Fruman were sent by Giuliani to Ukraine to extract damaging information on Trump's U.S. political rivals. "Their mission was to find people and information that could be used to undermine the Special Counsel's investigation, and also to damage former vice president Joseph R. Biden." Both were also at the center of the pro-Trump forces' push to remove the U.S. ambassador to Ukraine because her loyalty to President Trump was deemed deficient "as he pursued his agenda there". Also, over the course of a year beginning in 2018, the two brought Giuliani to Ukrainians who were amenable to promoting "a largely unsubstantiated narrative about the Bidens". These willing Ukrainians included Yuriy Lutsenko, a former prosecutor general of Ukraine, who was essential to aiding Giuliani's efforts to produce damaging information. In an interview published in December 2019, Giuliani stated, "I believed that I needed Yovanovitch out of the way. She was going to make the investigations difficult for everybody."

Giuliani's relationship with Parnas and Fruman is the subject of a criminal investigation by the FBI's New York field office and SDNY prosecutors. His business activities in Ukraine and potential violation of lobbying laws are under federal investigation, by FBI counterintelligence. SDNY prosecutors have examined Giuliani's bank statements. They are also investigating his finances, as well as meetings with and work for a Ukrainian city mayor. SDNY investigators have been questioning witnesses about Giuliani since August 2019, gathering information about his relationship to Parnas and Fruman. Bloomberg News reported in November 2019 that the Giuliani investigation could include charges of bribing foreign officials or conspiracy.

Referring to Parnas and Fruman, on October 10 Trump said, "I don't know those gentlemen," although that day The Wall Street Journal reported Trump had dinner with the men in the White House in early May 2018. BuzzFeed News featured photos of Lev Parnas posing with President Trump and both Parnas and Fruman posing with other Republicans in Washington, DC. Trump was photographed with Parnas as early as April 2014.

On October 15, 2019, it was reported that a New York grand jury had subpoenaed former congressman Pete Sessions (R-Texas) for documents and other information about his intercommunications and cooperation with Giuliani, Parnas, and Fruman. The subpoena demonstrated that the investigation into Giuliani's relationship to Parnas and Fruman remained active, as prosecutors determine whether Giuliani engaged in any illegal behavior. Giuliani seems to be the focal point of the subpoena. Sought after documents pertain to Giuliani's business affairs in Ukraine and his connection to the ouster of the former U.S. ambassador. The unsealed indictment against Parnas says he sought the help of the congressman to dismiss the former U.S. ambassador to Ukraine while sourcing the money to the congressman on behalf of "one or more Ukrainian government officials". Sessions followed up with a letter to the secretary of state requesting the ouster of the ambassador.

On November 4, 2019, Parnas's new attorney Joseph Bondy said his client would cooperate with congressional investigators in their Trump impeachment inquiry. Bondy later told The New York Times that shortly before Zelenskyy's May 20 inauguration, Parnas traveled to Kyiv to tell the incoming government that American military aid was contingent upon Ukraine's announcing an investigation of Joe Biden.

On January 14, 2020, the House Intelligence Committee released documents provided by Parnas, including text messages between Parnas and Robert Hyde, a Republican congressional candidate, in which Hyde described surveillance of Yovanovitch in Kyiv before she was recalled, including Hyde stating that she was under heavy security and "we have a person inside," adding, "they are willing to help if we/you would like a price" and "guess you can do anything in Ukraine with money." Two days later, Ukraine announced it was opening an investigation into the matter, while the State Department remained silent as the FBI visited Hyde's home and office. The documents also outlined text exchanges with then Ukrainian prosecutor general Yuriy Lutsenko in which he pushed for the ouster of Yovanovitch and offered information related to former U.S. vice president Joe Biden in return.

On January 15, 2020, Parnas stated in an interview that "President Trump knew exactly what was going on. He was aware of all my movements. I wouldn't do anything without the consent of Rudy Giuliani or the president" about the effort to push Ukraine to investigate the Bidens. The next day, Trump again asserted that he knew nothing about Parnas.

In an audio recording reportedly made by Fruman during a small dinner in April 2018, after Parnas and Fruman tell Trump that Yovanovitch was bad-mouthing him, Trump is apparently heard to say "Get rid of her! Get her out tomorrow. I don't care. Get her out tomorrow. Take her out. Okay? Do it."

=== Communications with other governments ===
==== Australia ====
On October 1, 2019, it was reported that the transcript of a Trump call with Australian prime minister Scott Morrison had been placed on the same top-secret server as the other transcripts. Trump was reported to have requested Morrison's aid in William Barr's investigation of the Mueller inquiry. Trump's request focused on the origins of the Mueller inquiry as a conversation between Australia's former foreign minister Alexander Downer and Trump campaign team member George Papadopoulos led to the investigation. The Australian government confirmed the call had taken place and that Morrison had articulated to the President that "the Australian Government has always been ready to assist and cooperate with efforts that help shed further light on the matters under investigation," but did not elaborate on what, if any, assistance had been offered. In a letter to William Barr dated May 28, Joe Hockey, Australia's ambassador to the U.S., pledged that the Australian government would "use its best endeavours" to support Barr's investigation. Hockey later rejected claims that Downer had been part of a conspiracy among intelligence agencies around the world to prevent Trump's election and undermine his eventual presidency.

The White House responded by dismissing the reports, claiming it was part of a routine request to grant Australian authorities access to Department of Justice resources to facilitate an investigation that had been open for several months. When questioned by a journalist, Morrison rejected Opposition Leader Anthony Albanese's accusation that he had jeopardized Australia's national security for the sake of a personal relationship with the president and instead insisted that cooperating with Barr's investigation was in the national interest. Morrison claimed that no specific request had been made of his government, but refused to go into detail as to what support had been provided, citing national security concerns.

==== Italy ====
On September 30, it was reported that Attorney General William Barr had travelled to Rome to enlist the support of Italian authorities in his investigation. Barr sought information related to a conspiracy theory that Joseph Mifsud was a Western intelligence operative who allegedly entrapped Trump campaign advisor George Papadopoulos in order to establish a false predicate for the FBI to open an investigation into Russian interference in the 2016 United States elections. Contrary to the conspiracy theory, that investigation was actually initiated after the Australian government notified American authorities that its diplomat Alexander Downer had a chance encounter with Papadopoulos, who boasted about possible access to Hillary Clinton emails held by the Russian government. Mifsud was last known to be in Rome in 2017, but had since disappeared. The Washington Post reported on November 22, 2019, that the Justice Department inspector general had aggressively investigated the allegation that Mifsud had been directed to entrap Papadopoulos, but found it was without merit.

==== China ====
On October 3, Trump publicly called upon China to investigate Hunter Biden's business activities there while his father was vice president. In 2013, Biden, Devon Archer, and Chinese businessman Jonathan Li founded BHR Partners, a business focused on investing Chinese capital in companies based outside of China. In September, Trump falsely claimed Biden "walk[ed] out of China with $1.5 billion in a fund" and earned "millions" of dollars from the BHR deal.

Trump discussed the political prospects of Biden, as well as former candidate Elizabeth Warren, another political rival, during a June 18 phone call with Chinese leader Xi Jinping. The record of the call was stored on the same highly restricted computer system used for the Trump–Zelenskyy call record. According to two people familiar with the discussion, Trump told Xi on the same call that "he would remain quiet on Hong Kong protests as trade talks progressed." The day after Trump's call for China to investigate Hunter Biden, Senator Mitt Romney said: "it strains credulity to suggest that [the request] is anything other than politically motivated." The Chinese foreign ministry said that the Chinese government had "no intention of intervening in the domestic affairs of the United States".

Michael Pillsbury, a China scholar at the Hudson Institute and a Trump advisor on trade negotiations with China, was quoted by the Financial Times on October 10: "I got quite a bit of background on Hunter Biden from the Chinese." Pillsbury denied the quote on C-SPAN hours later, asserting: "I haven't spoken to the Financial Times for a month." The Financial Times released an email showing Pillsbury made the statement on October 9. Pillsbury later told The Washington Post, "most everything I learned was already public or well-known" and that the Chinese "really, really didn't want to talk about it".

=== Release of John Bolton's manuscript ===
On January 26, The New York Times reported that former national security advisor John Bolton had written in a draft of his forthcoming book, The Room Where It Happened, that the president told him in August 2019 that he wanted to continue freezing $391 million in aid to Ukraine until officials there pursued investigations into Democrats, including the Bidens. Trump denied Bolton's claim. The manuscript was released after the first week of the impeachment trial, prompting House impeachment managers to call for the Senate to call Bolton as a witness. Bolton also claimed to have discussed the suspension of aid with Attorney General William Barr, and that the two had shared concerns over Trump offering personal favours to the leaders of autocratic regimes around the world, including Recep Tayyip Erdoğan in Turkey and Xi Jinping in China. The Times later reported that Bolton's manuscript described a May 2019 Oval Office meeting during which Trump directed Bolton to call Zelenskyy to ask him to meet with Giuliani about getting damaging information on the Bidens. Bolton reportedly wrote that Giuliani, Mulvaney and White House counsel Pat Cipollone—who, at the time of the report, was representing Trump in the impeachment trial—attended the meeting. Trump denied telling Bolton this, and Giuliani denied Mulvaney or Cipollone attended meetings related to Ukraine. Cipollone previously stated he never attended Ukraine-related meetings, and Mulvaney said he avoided Trump–Giuliani meetings so as to not jeopardize their attorney-client privilege.

=== Other federal investigations ===
In a January 2020 memo to all United States attorneys, department component heads and law enforcement agency heads, deputy attorney general Jeffrey Rosen stated there "currently are several distinct open investigations being handled by different U.S. attorney's offices and/or department components that in some way potentially relate to Ukraine." Rosen advised the addressees that Richard Donoghue, the U.S. attorney for Eastern District of New York (EDNY), had been assigned to coordinate these cases and "any and all new matters relating to Ukraine shall be directed exclusively to EDNY for investigation and proper handling." The memo stated that existing investigations would continue to be managed by the original investigators, but that any widening or expansion of those investigations required approval by Rosen and Donoghue. Federal prosecutors had indicated in December 2019 that it was likely new charges would be brought against Parnas, Fruman and two others, as the SDNY continued to investigate Giuliani into February and the Justice Department created an "intake process" to accept and scrutinize information from him about Joe Biden. That intake process was being managed by the Pittsburgh U.S. attorney's office, headed by Scott Brady.

The New York Times reported in May 2021 that federal investigators in Brooklyn began a criminal investigation late in the Trump administration into possible efforts by several current and former Ukrainian officials to spread unsubstantiated allegations about corruption by Joe Biden. Investigators were examining whether the Ukrainians used Giuliani as a channel for the allegations, though he was not a specific subject of the investigation, in contrast to a long-running investigation of Giuliani by the U.S. attorney's office in Manhattan.

== Reactions ==
=== Congress ===
On September 22, 2019, House speaker Nancy Pelosi said if the administration continued to withhold the whistleblower complaint from Congress, "they will be entering a grave new chapter of lawlessness which will take us into a whole new stage of investigation." House Intelligence Committee chairman Adam Schiff, stating he had previously been "very reluctant" to initiate impeachment proceedings against Trump, said, "we may very well have crossed the Rubicon here." The vast majority of Republicans did not comment on the matter, with notable exceptions of senators Lindsey Graham and Mitt Romney, both of whom suggested Trump should release information to resolve the situation.

On September 24, the Senate adopted by unanimous consent a sense of the Senate resolution calling for the whistleblower complaint to be immediately transmitted to the Senate Intelligence Committee.

Following the release of the memorandum of the conversation between Trump and Zelenskyy, Senator Romney called the memorandum "deeply troubling" and asked for more information to be made public. Pelosi said the memorandum "confirms that the President engaged in behavior that undermines the integrity of our elections, the dignity of the office he holds and our national security".

Some Republican senators dismissed the credibility of the whistleblower complaint as hearsay, but legal analysts subsequently found that assertions the whistleblower made in the complaint were verified by the memorandum record of Trump's telephone call.

On September 26, during a House hearing, Representative Adam Schiff gave a summary of the "essence" and the "character" of the Trump–Zelenskyy call. One part of Schiff's retelling was not represented in the non-verbatim memorandum of the call provided by the White House, when Schiff stated: "And I'm going to say this only seven times so you better listen good. I want you to make up dirt on my political opponent, understand. Lots of it. On this and on that." After Representative Mike Turner accused Schiff of "just making it up", Schiff responded that his summary "was meant to be at least part in parody" and acknowledged that "the president never said if you don't understand me, I'm going to say it seven more times." However, Schiff argued: "That's the message that the Ukraine president was receiving in not so many words."

Trump supporters on television, radio, and the Internet have pressured Republicans to continue supporting Trump. Republicans who have spoken out against Trump, expressed concern, or defended the whistleblower, such as senators Mitt Romney, Charles Grassley, Ben Sasse and Representative Adam Kinzinger, have come under criticism online by right-wing websites, with Romney becoming the target of baseless conspiracy theories and virally spread disinformation.

An October 21 political fact sheet release by Nancy Pelosi divided the scandal into three categories, according to the evidence, that "show Trump violated his oath of office": "The Shakedown", "The Pressure Campaign", and "The Cover-Up".

Despite President Trump and his allies insisting there had been no quid pro quo, mounting evidence from witness testimony indicated there had been, leading a growing number of Senate Republicans to accept there was a quid pro quo, while maintaining it was not illegal and did not justify impeachment. The Washington Post reported that House Republicans were considering portraying Giuliani, Sondland and Mulvaney as freelancers who had acted in their own self-interests without Trump's involvement.

=== President Trump and the White House ===
President Trump answers questions from the press on September 22, 2019.

In his initial comments to reporters on September 20, Trump characterized the whistleblower as "partisan", but added, "I do not know the identity of the whistleblower" and called the story "just another political hack job". (Note: Michael Atkinson, the ICIG who found the whistleblower complaint credible and urgent, was appointed during the Trump administration.) Trump also said: "Somebody ought to look into Joe Biden's statement because it was disgraceful where he talked about billions of dollars that he's not giving to a certain country unless a certain prosecutor is taken off the case. So somebody ought to look into that," suggesting the press was not reporting it. The press has reported on the Joe Biden matter for months but found no evidence of wrongdoing. On September 23, Trump asserted: "If a Republican ever did what Joe Biden did, if a Republican ever said what Joe Biden said, they'd be getting the electric chair right now." Before the White House released a rough transcript, Trump claimed that his call with Zelenskyy was "largely congratulatory" and "largely [discussed] corruption". However, the White House's rough transcript showed only a short congratulatory comment and no mentions of corruption. On September 25, during a meeting with Ukrainian president Zelenskyy, Trump said: "I want [Zelenskyy] to do whatever he can. Biden's son walks out of Ukraine with millions and millions of dollars. I think it's a horrible thing." Trump also denied explicitly tying U.S. military aid to Ukraine's corruption investigation involving Burisma Holdings. Within six hours of the impeachment inquiry being announced on September 24, Trump and his campaign team started a fundraising drive for an "Impeachment Defense Team". Forty-eight hours later, they had raised in excess of $13 million and signed up 50,000 new donors.

On September 27, Trump characterized the person who provided the whistleblower with information on the call as "close to a spy", adding: "you know what we used to do in the old days when we were smart? Right? With spies and treason, right? We used to handle them a little differently than we do now." On September 29, Trump requested to meet the whistleblower, saying that he and the American people "deserved" to meet them. He later said the White House was trying to learn the identity of the whistleblower. He also demanded that Adam Schiff be arrested and questioned "at the highest level" for fraud and treason. A letter from the whistleblower's lawyers, addressed to the director of national intelligence, said that the whistleblower was afraid for their safety. On November 7 the whistleblower's lawyer sent a letter to the White House warning Trump to "cease and desist" calling for the public disclosure of the whistleblower's identity and "engaging in rhetoric and activity that places [the whistleblower] and their family in physical danger". The lawyer said the president would be legally and morally liable if anyone were to be "physically harmed as a result of his, or his surrogates', behavior".

On October 1, Trump claimed that any attempt to remove him from office would result in a "Civil War-like fracture". He also called for Schiff to be arrested for treason, and later claimed that Nancy Pelosi was "every bit as guilty as Liddle' [sic] Adam Schiff for High Crimes and Misdemeanours, and even Treason" before calling for both Schiff and Pelosi to be impeached themselves as they had "evilly 'Colluded'".

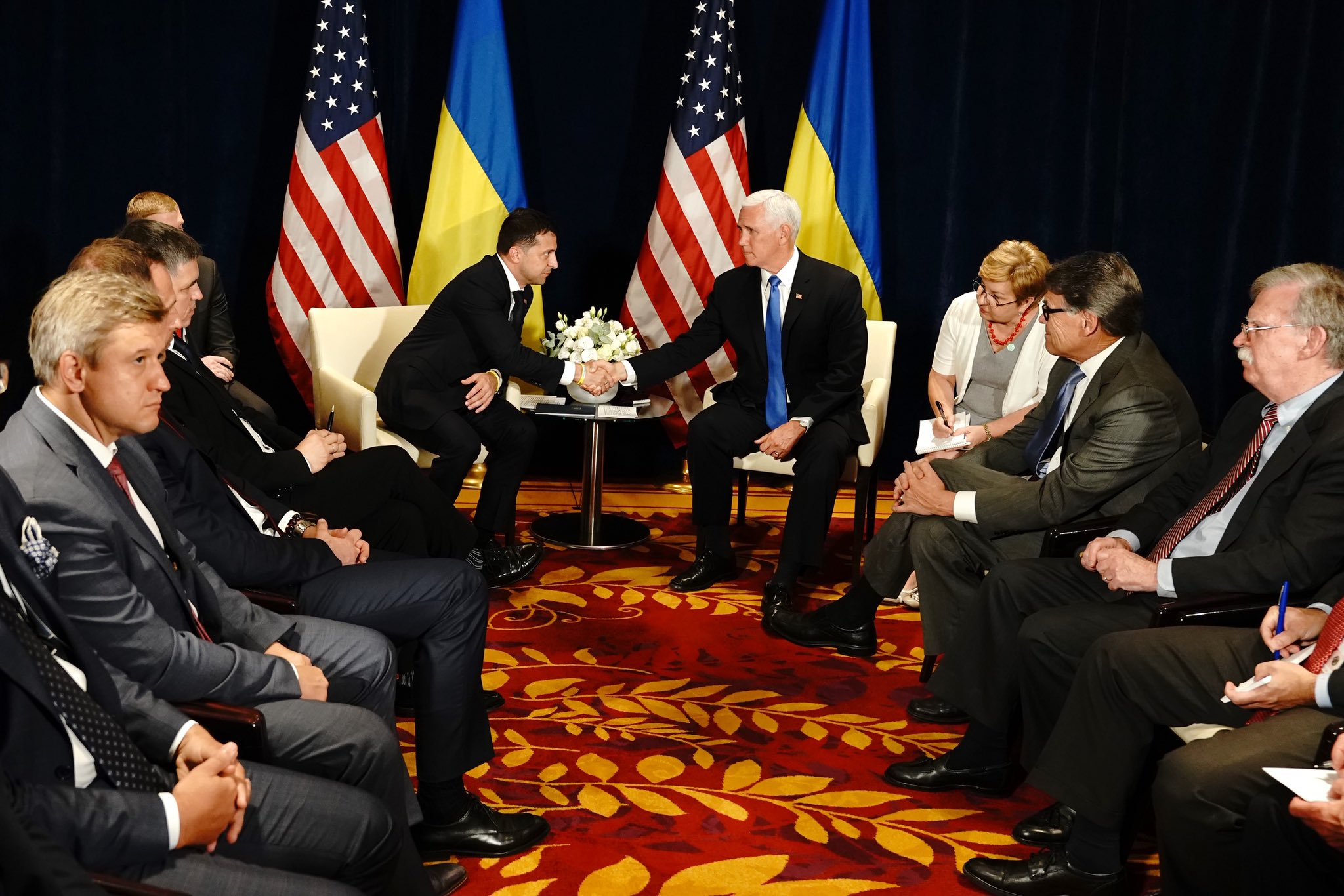
Vice President Mike Pence and U.S. delegation meet with President Zelenskyy in Warsaw on September 1, 2019.

On October 3, after stating that the U.S. has "tremendous power" and "many options" in the trade war with China "if they don't do what we want", Trump was asked by a reporter on what he hoped Zelenskyy would do after his phone call. Trump responded by publicly urging both Ukraine and China to investigate the Bidens. Later in the day, Vice President Mike Pence voiced his support of Trump's comments, saying: "I think the American people have a right to know if the vice president of the United States or his family profited from his position." Pence said the activities of the Biden family were "worth looking into". Trump later claimed that when he called upon China to investigate the Bidens, his only interest was in thwarting corruption. Mitt Romney was critical of this, saying: "When the only American citizen President Trump singles out for China's investigation is his political opponent in the midst of the Democratic nomination process, it strains credulity to suggest that this is anything other than politically motivated."

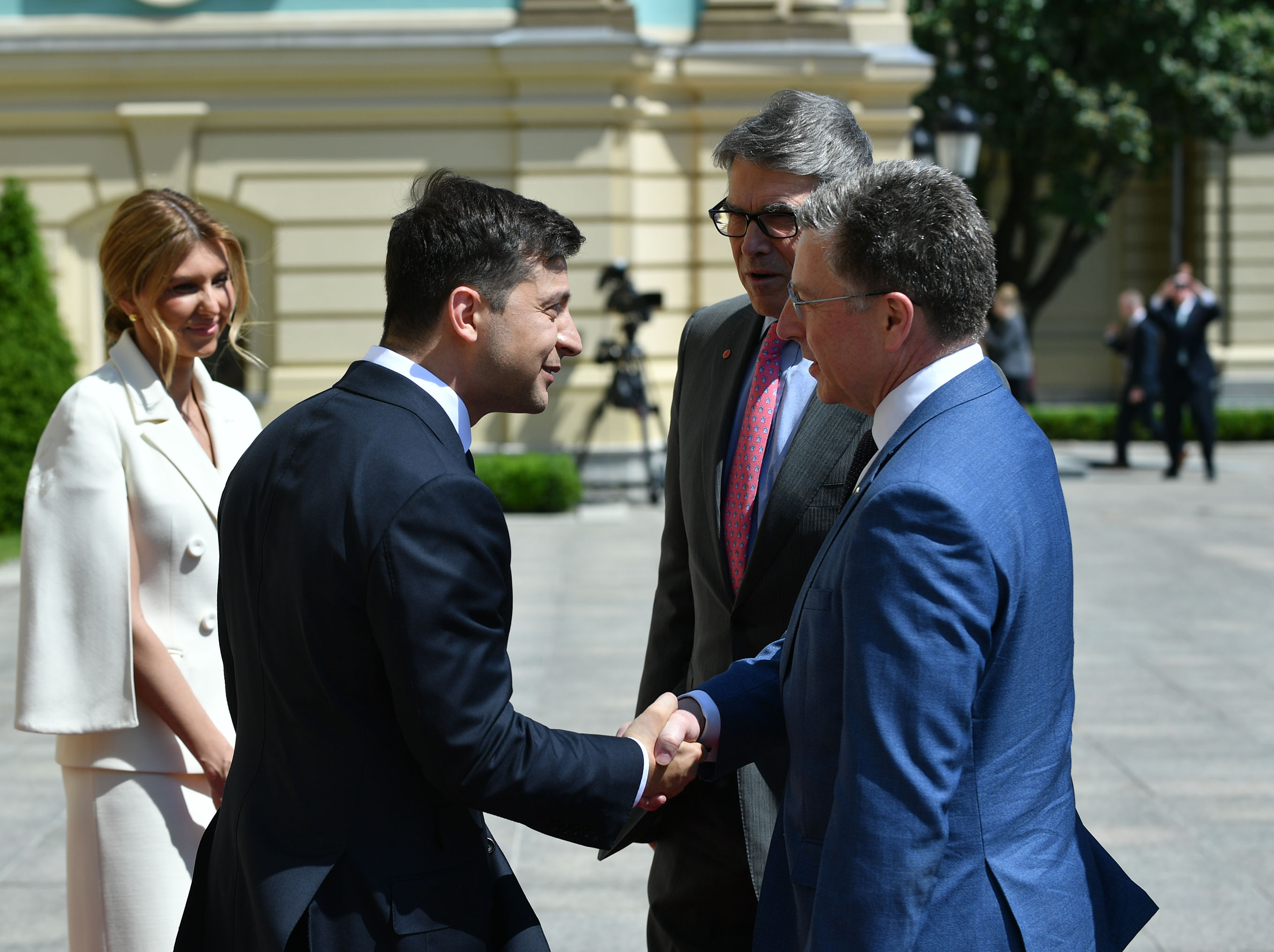
Ukrainian President Zelenskyy with Kurt Volker and Rick Perry, May 2019

On October 4, Trump told congressional Republican leaders the only reason he had called Zelenskyy was at the urging of Energy Secretary Rick Perry, saying Perry wanted him to discuss a liquefied natural gas (LNG) plant and that Trump had not even wanted to make the call. However, there is no mention of LNG in the publicly released summary of the conversation, and text messages exchanged among aides who were setting up the phone call made no mention of Perry, instead suggesting that Giuliani was the primary mover. Perry had been the administration's official representative at Zelenskyy's inauguration in May. During that trip; he pressured Zelenskyy to fire board members of Naftogaz, the national oil and gas company of Ukraine, and informed government and industry officials that the Trump administration wanted the entirety of Naftogaz's supervisory board replaced. Perry denied pressing for change at Naftogaz in a press conference on October 7, describing that as "a totally dreamed up story". On October 10, however, Perry was issued a subpoena by the House Intelligence Committee, the House Oversight Committee, and the House Foreign Affairs Committee, partially concerning his interactions with Naftogaz.

Trump's 2020 reelection campaign developed a campaign ad that repeated unsubstantiated claims about Biden, asserting that "when President Trump asks Ukraine to investigate corruption, the Democrats want to impeach him and their media lapdogs fall in line." CNN refused to broadcast the ads because Trump's claims had already been debunked and for disparaging its journalists.

=== Ukraine ===
Volodymyr Zelenskyy with Donald Trump in New York City on September 25, 2019

On September 20, Roman Truba, head of the Ukraine State Bureau of Investigations, told The Daily Beast that his agency had not investigated the Biden–Burisma connection and there were no signs of illegality there. Anton Herashchenko, a senior advisor to the Ukraine interior minister, told The Daily Beast that Ukraine will open such an investigation if there is an official request, along with details of why an investigation is needed and what to look for. Trump's requests have come through unofficial representatives such as Giuliani.

However, according to interviews and documents obtained by The New York Times, senior Ukrainian officials were aware that military aid was being withheld by the first week in August, and after initially having difficulty ascertaining what was holding up the aid, by September Trump's envoy to Ukraine Kurt Volker was in negotiations with Zelenskyy's senior aide Andriy Yermak over the wording of the proposed public statement. Volker pressed for wording explicitly confirming investigations into Joe Biden's alleged pressure campaign for the removal of the Ukrainian prosecutor who was allegedly investigating Burisma, and into accusations that Ukraine had been involved in interference with the 2016 U.S. presidential election in favor of Hillary Clinton, while Yermak attempted to negotiate less explicit language.

George Kent, the deputy assistant secretary of state for European and Eurasian affairs, testified to the congressional impeachment inquiry that "Zelenskyy needed to go to a microphone and basically there needed to be three words in the message": investigations, Biden, 2016 (or synonymously, Hillary Clinton). Diplomat Bill Taylor testified that Trump insisted that the public declaration be made on CNN, and Times reporting found that Zelenskyy's staff finally capitulated to this demand, and arranged for him to appear on Fareed Zakaria's CNN program on September 13 to make the statement. The appearance was canceled after the Ukraine aid was released on September 11.

Ukrainian foreign minister Vadym Prystaiko told a Ukrainian news outlet on September 21: "I know what the [phone] conversation was about and I think there was no pressure. This conversation was long, friendly, and it touched on many questions, sometimes requiring serious answers." Prystaiko was also quoted as saying: "I want to say that we are an independent state, we have our secrets." On September 22, Senator Chris Murphy said Zelenskyy told him he had no intention to get involved with an American election.

In an interview released on September 24, Ukrainian diplomat and politician Valentyn Nalyvaichenko told The Daily Beast that Ukrainian authorities would be reopening corruption investigations into multiple individuals and organizations including, potentially, Burisma, Trump campaign manager Paul Manafort, TV host Larry King, and former prosecutor Yuriy Lutsenko. King was suspected of receiving slush fund payments recorded in the "black ledger" that also named Manafort. Nalyvaichenko accused Lutsenko of having been in communication with associates of Trump "for vindictive purposes".

During the joint press conference on September 25 with Trump for reporters gathered at the United Nations General Assembly, President Volodymyr Zelenskyy told reporters: "We had I think good phone call. It was normal. We spoke about many things. So, I think, and you read it, that nobody pushed me." The next day, Zelenskyy said President Trump had not pressured anyone nor made any promises, and that the prosecutor general Ruslan Riaboshapka would investigate all domestic cases without prejudice. On September 30, Zelenskyy made it clear that he was not going to interfere with the intra-American party confrontation. Subsequently, at an all-day press conference on October 10, Zelenskyy said he only learned about the blockage of the military aid after the July 25 phone call. "We didn't speak about this. There was no blackmail."

=== European Union ===
During the conversation, Zelenskyy and Trump criticized German chancellor Angela Merkel and European Union for a lack of support toward Ukraine. Elmar Brok, special adviser on Ukraine for President Jean-Claude Juncker, refuted the criticism, pointing to the economic boost provided by the European Union through a free trade agreement. In addition, he claimed the U.S. has not signed a similar agreement with Ukraine. The conversation prompted Europeans to calculate the amount of aid given to Ukraine since 2014, and by approximate estimates, the EU and European financial institutions have provided assistance to more than $16 billion in grants and loans.

In the overall ranking in 2016–2017, the European Union is the leader in terms of aid, the U.S. the second, and Germany is the third. However, Ukrainian media analyzed the data and found that from 2014, Germany provided aid of €1.4 billion: €500 million is a loan that will be repaid, €200 million is a share of Germany from European Union assistance, and the rest is really full-fledged assistance. Germany has stated that its attitude towards Ukraine has not changed.

=== Russia ===
Former Ukrainian prime minister Mykola Azarov expressed support for an investigation into Hunter Biden. Azarov fled to Russia in 2014 following the Euromaidan protests and is currently in exile in Moscow. He has called for a pro-Russian 'regime change' in Ukraine, is wanted for prosecution in Ukraine for abuse of power and embezzlement, has set up a government in exile, and is widely seen as a pro-Russian puppet.

President Vladimir Putin's spokesman Dmitry Peskov said, "You have to admit, the publication of a full transcript of a conversation—be it by phone or face-to-face—is uncommon in interstate diplomatic practice. At least, uncommon until now." Speaking at an energy conference in Moscow, Putin said: "I didn't see during the telephone conversation that Trump demanded some compromising information from Zelenskyy at all costs, and threatened that he would [otherwise] not provide assistance to Ukraine."

=== Former U.S. officials ===
More than 300 former U.S. foreign policy and national security officials who had served under both Democratic and Republican administrations signed an open letter on September 27, supporting a congressional impeachment inquiry into Trump's conduct relating to Ukraine. The officials, who formerly served in the U.S. Intelligence Community, National Security Council, and departments of Defense, Justice, and Homeland Security, wrote that Trump's actions raised "a profound national security concern" and that "President Trump appears to have leveraged the authority and resources of the highest office in the land to invite additional foreign interference into our democratic processes. If we fail to speak up—and act—now our foreign policy and national security will officially be on offer to those who can most effectively fulfill the President's personal prerogatives."

The American Foreign Service Association and American Academy of Diplomacy, representing members of the U.S. diplomatic corps, expressed alarm at Trump's disparagement of the former U.S. ambassador to Ukraine in his call with Zelenskyy.

Ten former White House chiefs of staff, who served under both Republican and Democratic presidents (Note: The chiefs of staff were from the Reagan, George H. W. Bush, Clinton, George W. Bush, and Obama administrations.) described it as unprecedented for an incumbent president to "personally apply pressure to foreign powers to damage political opponents". When the ten were interviewed, "none recalled any circumstance under which the White House had solicited or accepted political help from other countries, and all said they would have considered the very idea out of bounds."

In an op-ed in The Washington Post, 17 former members of the Watergate scandal special prosecutor force (Note: Including Richard Ben-Veniste, Paul R. Michel, and others) wrote that "there exists compelling prima facie evidence that President Trump has committed impeachable offenses," specifically serious and persistent abuses of power, and the Congress "should not allow any refusal by the president to cooperate in its process to frustrate the performance of its constitutional duties."

=== American editorials and commentary ===
The Washington Post and The New York Times editorial boards supported the impeachment inquiry against Trump arising from the scandal. The Post editorial board criticized the administration and its allies for defying congressional subpoenas and stonewalling the investigation, and called upon congressional Republicans to "have the moral courage" to recognize the Trump administration's Ukraine pressure campaign as corrupt and a quid pro quo. Another The Washington Post editorial criticized the Trump administration for attacking William B. Taylor Jr., the acting U.S. ambassador to Ukraine, and other career civil servants who have testified before Congress, writing that it was "vile" to attack "honest and courageous public servants" in an attempt to discredit them. Some newspaper editorial boards called upon Trump to resign from office over the Ukraine scandal, including the editorial board of Hearst Connecticut Media, which owns eight daily newspapers in Connecticut. A St. Louis Post-Dispatch editorial urged congressional Republicans to call for Trump's resignation.

Pro-Trump media outlets and commentators, such as Jeanine Pirro, Mark Levin, and Rush Limbaugh, responded by defending Trump and promoting an alternative narrative of the Ukraine affair that omitted significant facts. Echoing Trump's own rhetoric, the president's defenders in the media often attacked the whistleblower, and characterized the investigation as not only a political attack against Trump, but also "a culture war" against his supporters. Fox News anchor Chris Wallace characterized the spin by Trump allies in the aftermath of the whistleblower complaint becoming public as "astonishing" and "deeply misleading".

=== Public opinion ===
In the days after the scandal arose, multiple polls showed a surge in support for an impeachment inquiry, or impeachment itself.

=== Resignations ===
The American special envoy to Ukraine, Kurt Volker, resigned one day after the complaint was released. The whistleblower complaint alleges Volker "sought to 'contain the damage' from Trump attorney Rudy Giuliani's outreach to Ukraine's government about the Biden family". On October 10, Michael McKinley, a senior advisor to Secretary of State Mike Pompeo, resigned over disappointment in Pompeo's lack of public support for those named in the scandal.

=== Internet communities ===
After the whistleblower complaint was publicized, users on pro-Trump Internet forums tried to identify its author. These attempts at "doxing" were marked by disorganized speculation, racism and misogyny. In October 2019, pro-Trump writer Paul Sperry published on the web what he asserted was the identity of the whistleblower. During ensuing days, Trump and his allies asserted major news outlets were covering for the whistleblower because they had declined to repeat the whistleblower's alleged identity in their reporting. However, the generally pro-Trump Fox News—including close Trump confidant Sean Hannity—also declined to repeat the alleged identity, on instructions from Fox News management.

Trump supporters paid for Facebook advertisements to spread the purported name of the whistleblower. These ads were viewed by potentially "hundreds of thousands of users" before Facebook removed them.

== Aftermath ==
=== Impeachment and senate trial ===
President Trump was impeached by Congress on charges of abuse of power and obstructing Congress. The articles of impeachment were referred to the Senate, which held a trial over twenty days from January 16 to February 5, 2020. Trump was acquitted on both charges by the Republican-controlled Senate, with the vote split along party lines. (Note: Utah senator Mitt Romney was the only senator to break with his party, voting in favour of removing Trump from office on the charge of abusing the power of his office.) Maine senator Susan Collins, who emerged as a key figure during the impeachment trial owing to her perceived willingness to break with her party, defended the acquittal as she believed Trump had learned from the trial and would not attempt to solicit foreign interference in future.

=== Resignations and firings of witnesses ===
Marie Yovanovitch and Bill Taylor resigned from their positions in the State Department. Jennifer Williams left her position to take up a new post. Alexander Vindman was dismissed from his position in the White House following Trump's acquittal by the Senate. Vindman's twin brother Yevgeny—who was not involved in the case—was also dismissed. Both Vindman brothers were reported to have been physically escorted from the White House. Gordon Sondland was also recalled from his position as ambassador. The White House claimed that the dismissals were necessary, but Trump was criticized for seeking revenge against those who had testified against him. Trump was also reported to have labelled Williams and Vindman as "Never Trumpers". Trump suggested that the Pentagon should seek disciplinary action against Vindman, but the Army declined to investigate. John Rood, the top Pentagon policy advisor who, on July 25, 2019, warned Defense Secretary Mark Esper against withholding military aid to Ukraine, was forced to resign on February 19, 2020. In May 2019 he had certified to Congress that Ukraine was eligible for the aid.

Subsequently, during a panel discussion held on February 11, 2020, at the Atlantic Council, the president's national security advisor, Robert C. O'Brien said that it was his decision to transfer both Vindman brothers back to the Army for re-assignment and denied that the move was ordered by Trump in retaliation for Vindman's testimony. "I can absolutely tell you that they were not retaliated against", O'Brien told the panel. O'Brien also disputed the move as being characterized as "fired" since both brothers remain on active duty. O'Brien noted that their transfer was part of a larger NSA staff reduction. It was later reported that the firings and dismissals were part of a wider purge of the Trump administration that targeted people who were perceived as not being loyal enough to Trump and his agenda, including intelligence officials who might be part of Trump's claims of a "deep state" conspiracy against him.

Michael Atkinson was fired from his position as Inspector General of the Intelligence Community in April 2020. The White House issued a statement that Trump had lost confidence in Atkinson's ability to perform his duties. The decision to fire Atkinson was criticized because his role as Inspector General was supposed to be independent and because Trump chose to fire him during the coronavirus pandemic, which led to claims that Trump had tried to use the pandemic to distract from Atkinson's firing.

=== Giuliani's activities in Ukraine ===
As the impeachment hearings and trial unfolded, Rudy Giuliani returned to Ukraine to conduct his own investigation into Joe and Hunter Biden. This was widely criticized as a further attempt to undermine Biden's election campaign, for promoting widely debunked conspiracy theories about the Bidens, for Giuliani being a likely target for misinformation spread by Russian intelligence services, and because Giuliani is himself under investigation by American authorities. Giuliani went on to claim that he had found evidence that Barack Obama and Joe Biden had previously contacted Ukrainian officials looking to open an investigation into Paul Manafort, the chair of Trump's 2016 presidential campaign, who had lobbied to American lawmakers on behalf of former Ukrainian president Viktor Yanukovych.

In February 2020, Attorney General William Barr announced that the Justice Department would receive any information gathered by Giuliani. Barr had previously announced that all investigations into foreign donations and interference into the 2020 presidential elections would require his personal approval.

During the impeachment process, Trump denied having sent Giuliani to Ukraine, but in an interview that aired on February 13, 2020, he reversed his prior denials and openly admitted sending Giuliani to Ukraine, praising him as a "crime fighter" and "the best prosecutor."

=== Place in the Russia investigation conspiracy theory ===
In February 2020, United States attorney John Durham was appointed to lead an investigation into the Mueller inquiry's origins. It was reported that the investigation was focusing on former CIA director and Trump critic John Brennan and whether he had mishandled evidence during the early stages of the inquiry into Russian meddling in the 2016 elections. Mick Mulvaney linked Durham's investigation to the Ukraine scandal, stating that Durham had sought help from Ukraine and interviewed Ukrainian citizens. The Durham inquiry has been described as an "inquiry into its own Russia investigation" and "investigating the investigators" of the Russian interference.

== Impact on Ukraine–Russia relations ==
Alexander Vindman, the former director for European affairs who supported the whistleblower's testimony, claimed Trump's intervention weakened Ukrainian efforts to counteract Russian aggression in a number of ways in an interview with VICE News, saying "It's because of Trump's corruption that we have a less capable, less prepared Ukraine".

== Conspiracy theories ==
Trump and his allies had since 2017 promoted a conspiracy theory that Ukraine, rather than Russia, had interfered with the 2016 election, which American intelligence believes has been promoted by Russia in order to frame Ukraine. Some speculate Maria Zakharova at Russia's Ministry of Foreign Affairs was the source of this campaign. The conspiracy theory included allegations that Democrats, CrowdStrike and the FBI had conspired to frame Russia in the 2016 hacking of a Democratic National Committee server. Trump has repeatedly insisted without evidence that an unnamed Ukrainian oligarch was behind the conspiracy to frame Russia and that Ukraine is in possession of the DNC server.

Shortly before Trump took office, top American intelligence officials briefed him on their evidence—including from their hacking of Russian intelligence networks and information provided by a high-level Kremlin mole—that Russia was behind the hacking and other election interference, on the personal orders and orchestration of Vladimir Putin. In December 2019, the Trump-appointed FBI director Christopher Wray stated, "we have no information that indicates that Ukraine interfered with the 2016 presidential election," adding, "there's all kinds of people saying all kinds of things out there. I think it's important for the American people to be thoughtful consumers of information and to think about the sources of it and to think about the support and predication for what they hear."

=== CrowdStrike ===
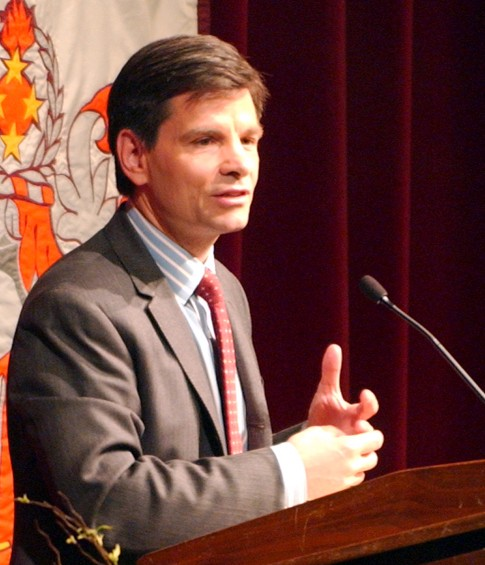
George Stephanopoulos described the details of the CrowdStrike conspiracy theory as "both convoluted and false".

During the July 25, 2019, phone call between Trump and Zelenskyy, Trump referred to a far-right conspiracy theory pushed by internet trolls, right-wing blogs, right-wing news websites and Russian state media. This conspiracy theory concerns CrowdStrike, the cybersecurity and internet security firm that first investigated the 2015–2016 hacking of the Democratic National Committee (DNC) network and determined that Russian military intelligence (GRU) was behind these cyber attacks.

Tom Bossert, Trump's former homeland security advisor, said in an interview with ABC News' George Stephanopoulos that Trump was repeatedly warned by his staff that the CrowdStrike conspiracy theory was "completely debunked". Bossert blamed Giuliani for Trump's fixation upon the conspiracy theory.

The overarching theme of the CrowdStrike conspiracy theory is that the DNC fabricated evidence to implicate Russia in the cyber attacks. CrowdStrike's co-founder, Dmitri Alperovitch, is a naturalized American citizen born in the Soviet Union. According to the hoax, Alperovitch is a Ukrainian who was ordered by the DNC to discredit Russia for the election interference, and he was personally motivated to get even with Vladimir Putin. Also, according to the theory, CrowdStrike is owned by a rich Ukrainian, and the actual server involved in the cyber attack is in Ukraine.

CrowdStrike is actually a publicly traded company headquartered in California that the National Republican Congressional Committee has also hired for cyber security services. "The server" is actually 140 servers, decommissioned and located in the United States. The theory additionally says FBI agents were not allowed to examine the server because such action would expose the DNC plot, although in fact—and as documented in the Mueller Report—system images and traffic logs of the DNC servers were provided to the FBI by CrowdStrike, although the FBI never examined the servers directly. This conspiracy theory originated from a "GRU persona, 'Guccifer 2.0', created to cast doubt on Russia's culpability in the DNC [intrusion]".

=== Actions of first whistleblower ===
Various right-wing commentators speculated the whistleblower had help from others, perhaps constituting a coordinated conspiracy. Speculation centered around Adam Schiff, the press, Fusion GPS, Media Matters, a team of lawyers or a research firm, and the intelligence community in general. After the whistleblower had informed the CIA's general counsel of his concerns, he grew troubled by "how that initial avenue for airing his allegations through the CIA was unfolding", according to The New York Times. He then contacted an aide for the House Intelligence Committee and provided a vague statement. The aide then followed standard procedure and advised the whistleblower to find a lawyer and file a complaint with the Intelligence Community inspector general (IC IG). Neither Rep. Schiff nor the other members of the committee saw the complaint until the night before they released it publicly, and the Committee was not involved in writing the complaint. Schiff and the committee had no role in helping the whistleblower select an attorney.

According to Mark S. Zaid, a member of the whistleblower's pro bono legal team: "The whistleblower took the advice to find an attorney and did what most people do, they asked around to trusted friends as to who they should contact. Andrew [Bakaj]'s name was provided and he was retained. Exactly how it happens every day." Andrew P. Bakaj is the Lead Attorney representing the whistleblower. During a news conference on October 2, Trump claimed that The New York Times article proved Schiff had helped write the whistleblower complaint, prompting one of the reporters who wrote the story to reply on Twitter that their story said no such thing and that Schiff had not even known the whistleblower's identity.

=== Whistleblower rules and hearsay ===
In late September, Trump tweeted a conspiracy theory that whistleblower rules were changed before the whistleblower complaint was submitted. Senator Lindsey Graham, and Trump's lawyers Jay Sekulow and Rudy Giuliani made similar claims. Trump's claim was based on an article from The Federalist which incorrectly stated that the IC IG "secretly eliminated a requirement that whistleblowers provide direct, first-hand knowledge of alleged wrongdoings", by revising their complaint form sometime between May 2018 and August 2019, removing a section from the old form containing the sentence: "If you think wrongdoing took place, but can provide nothing more than secondhand or unsubstantiated assertions, IC IG will not be able to process the complaint or information for submission as an ICWPA." The Federalist article failed to mention that the old form had checkboxes where the whistleblower could indicate that their information was "direct" or from either "other employees" or other indirect sources.

The IC IG responded the whistleblower's complaint was submitted with the old form (before the forms changed), and that the whistleblower's complaint was based on both "direct knowledge of certain alleged conduct" and knowledge from other employees. The IC IG also said the old form had been under review, and that "in response to recent press inquiries regarding the instant whistleblower complaint", the form was changed because "certain language in those forms and, more specifically, the informational materials accompanying the forms, could be read—incorrectly—as suggesting that whistleblowers must possess first-hand information in order to file an urgent concern complaint". The IC IG also said that by law a complainant is not required to have "first-hand information" themselves, and that their office "cannot add conditions to the filing of an urgent concern that do not exist in law".

The "rules" for whistleblowing arise from Intelligence Community Directive 120, last updated in 2016. The directive states that the requirement for a complaint is to be one which the whistleblower "reasonably believes evidences a violation of any law, rule or regulation". The burden of obtaining and evaluating first-hand knowledge for credibility is placed on the IC IG, who has 14 days to conduct an investigation to do so. In this case, the preliminary review done by the IC IG did find more information to support the allegations as credible. Tom Devine of the Government Accountability Project, a non-profit watchdog organization, said only around 10% of all credible whistleblower complaints have firsthand information.

Republican senator Chuck Grassley, a prominent author and advocate of whistleblower laws, spoke out against the conspiracy theory, saying the whistleblower appeared to have acted in accordance with the law and deserved to be heard.

=== George Soros ===
In late-September television appearances, Giuliani asserted without offering any evidence that George Soros, a frequent subject of conservative conspiracy theories, was running an anti-Trump scheme in Ukraine while Biden was protecting Soros from prosecution there. Lawyers Joseph diGenova and Victoria Toensing appeared as guests on The Sean Hannity Show to promote the conspiracy theory that Soros funded the whistleblower. They cited the whistleblower's footnote references to the Organized Crime and Corruption Reporting Project, an organization that has received grants from Soros' Open Society Foundations among multiple other funding sources. Soros was also invoked, again without evidence, by the media organization Breitbart News.

Discredited allegations against Soros were also part of a "packet of propaganda and disinformation" that had been circulating within the State Department since May 2019, until being revealed to Congress on October 2.

=== Biden–Ukraine conspiracy theory ===
The Biden–Ukraine conspiracy theory is part of efforts by Donald Trump and his campaign in the Trump–Ukraine scandal, which led to Trump's first impeachment. These falsehoods were spread in an attempt to damage Joe Biden's reputation and chances during the 2020 presidential campaign, and later in an effort to impeach him.

== See also ==
- Corruption in the United States
- Foreign interference in the 2020 United States elections
- List of federal political scandals in the United States
- List of impeachments of heads of state
- List of "-gate" scandals
- United States District Court for the Eastern District of New York
