= Robert F. Hyde =

American lobbyist and political candidate

Robert Hyde

Personal details
- Born: December 19, 1979 (age 46)
- Party: Republican
- Education: Central Connecticut State University
- Occupation: Businessman, lobbyist, political candidate
- Known for: Association with the Trump–Ukraine scandal

Military service
- Allegiance: United States
- Branch/service: United States Marine Corps
- Years of service: 1995–2005

Robert Finley Hyde (born December 19, 1979) is an American landscaper, lobbyist, and political candidate. Hyde gained attention during the first impeachment of Donald Trump as a figure associated with the Trump–Ukraine scandal. He runs a lobbying firm, Finley Hyde & Associates, in Washington, D.C.

== Early life ==
Hyde was raised in Canton, Connecticut, and attended Central Connecticut State University. He has said that he served in the United States Marine Corps from 1999 to 2005 that he was deployed twice to Iraq. He started a landscape company, RF Landscaping and Construction, in 2000.

== Career ==
=== Politics ===
In June 2019, Hyde filed to challenge Senator Richard Blumenthal in the 2022 United States Senate elections. In August 2019, Hyde launched a congressional campaign to unseat Jahana Hayes.

Following sexually crude comments Hyde made about Kamala Harris, Connecticut Republicans called on Hyde to end his campaign, and the Connecticut Republican Party refunded the contributions he made to the party.

In the 2024 United States Senate election in Connecticut, Hyde was on the ballot as the candidate of the Cheaper Gas Groceries Party, facing off against incumbent Chris Murphy and two other candidates. He earned 14,879 votes, representing 0.87 percent of the total vote.

Hyde opposes red flag laws and universal background checks, and supports legalizing recreational marijuana use.

Hyde has promoted the far-right QAnon conspiracy theory.

Hyde has made monetary contributions to various politicians, candidates, and organizations, including Donald Trump, Devin Nunes, Greg Pence, Patrick Morrisey, Jim Renacci, America First Action, and the Tea Party Majority Fund. Finley Enterprises LLC, which runs Finley's campaign page, managed several pro-Trump Facebook pages that would later be suspended by Facebook for coordinated inauthentic behavior.

=== Trump–Ukraine scandal ===
Hyde was in communication with Lev Parnas, and reportedly had associates in Ukraine monitoring the movements of then-Ambassador Marie Yovanovitch. Hyde shared timely information about the ambassador's movements, location and security coverage: "She's talked to three people. Her phone is off. Computer is off. She's next to the embassy… Private security." and "They will let me know when she’s on the move… They are willing to help if you/we would like a price." The revelations were of great concern to various former foreign service officers and the former ambassador asked for an investigation into this activity. In a subsequent interview with Eric Bolling, Hyde claimed that he was joking.

In an interview with Rachel Maddow on MSNBC on January 15, 2020, Lev Parnas said he did not believe that Hyde was being truthful, though he identified many other alleged participants discussing their roles in the Trump–Ukraine scandal. He also attributed Hyde's behavior to being "drunk all the time."

On January 16, 2020, Hyde's home and office in Connecticut were searched by the Federal Bureau of Investigation.

== Legal issues ==
In May 2011 in Avon, Connecticut, Hyde was arrested and charged with reckless endangerment after his landscape company felled a tree onto an overhead power line. According to Hyde, the case was later dropped and the fine covered by his insurance provider.

In May 2019, Hyde was taken into police custody at the Trump National Doral Miami after telling an officer that "a hit man was out to get [him]", and was detained under the Florida Mental Health Act and Marchman Act.

In 2019, Hyde was also reported to police for trespassing at the First Church of Christ in Connecticut.

In November 2019, Hyde was compelled by a magistrate to make child support payments to Jennyfer Morin to support their 13-year-old child. He was also sued by Between the Bridges, LLC for failing to pay fees owed to a marina in Old Saybrook, Connecticut in January 2019, and by a landlord in Simsbury, Connecticut in February 2019 over unpaid rent.

Hyde violated a restraining order issued by a judge in Washington, D.C., ordering him to stay away from a political consultant who said Hyde was stalking her, leading police to confiscate three rifles and two shotguns from him.

== Personal life ==
Hyde is legally deaf, and uses a service dog, a German Shepherd named Thunder.
