= Drug policy =

Policy regarding the control and regulation of psychoactive substances

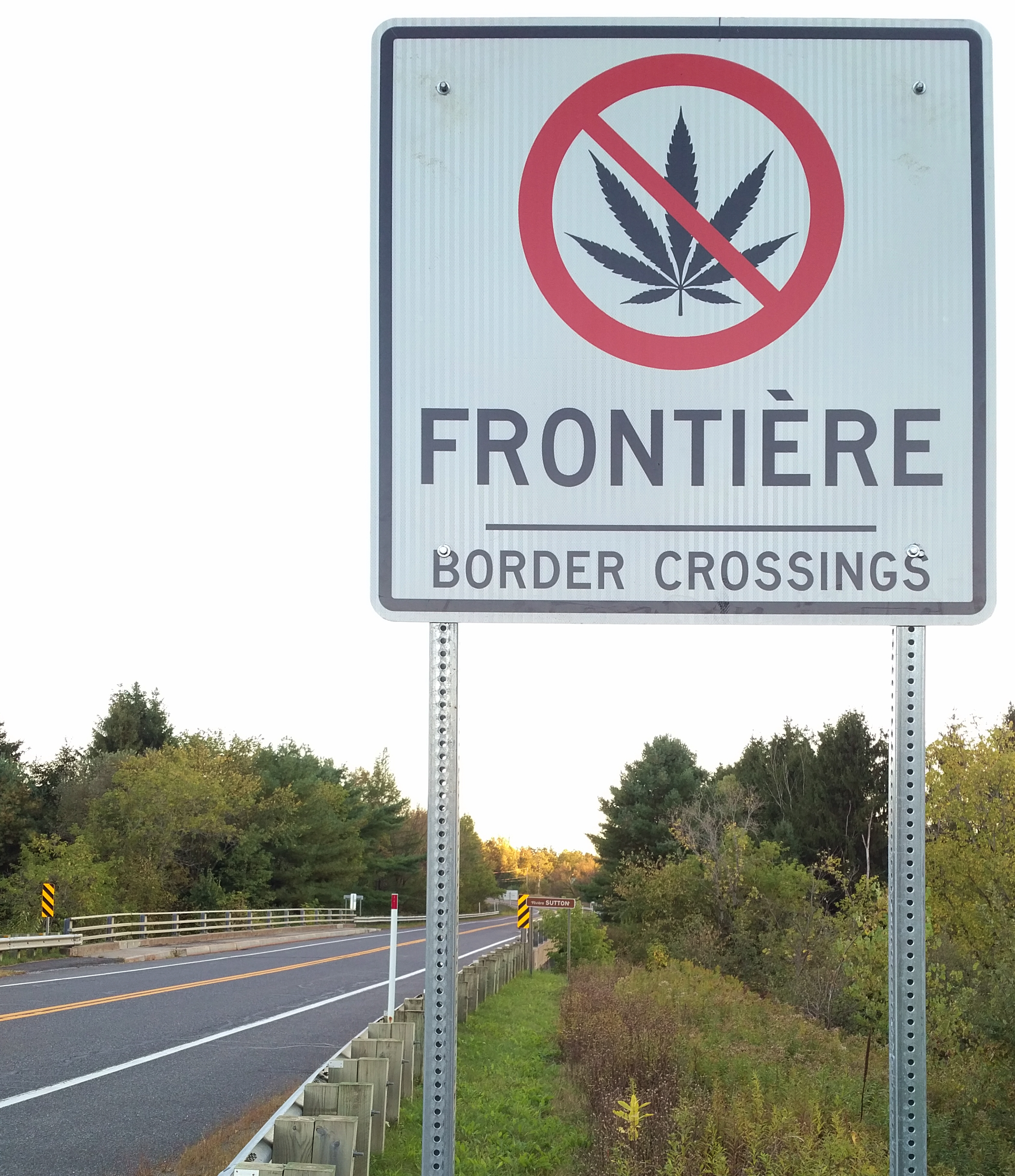
Road sign banning cannabis at the Canada-US border.

A drug policy is the policy regarding the control and regulation of psychoactive substances (commonly referred to as drugs), particularly those that are addictive or cause physical and mental dependence. While drug policies are generally implemented by governments, entities at all levels (from international organisations, national or local government, administrations, or public places) may have specific policies related to drugs.

Drug policies are usually aimed at combating drug addiction or dependence addressing both demand and supply of drugs, as well as mitigating the harm of drug use, and providing medical assistance and treatment. Demand reduction measures include voluntary treatment, rehabilitation, substitution therapy, overdose management, alternatives to incarceration for drug related minor offenses, medical prescription of drugs, awareness campaigns, community social services, and support for families. Supply side reduction involves measures such as enacting foreign policy aimed at eradicating the international cultivation of plants used to make drugs and interception of drug trafficking, fines for drug offenses, incarceration for persons convicted for drug offenses. Policies that help mitigate the dangers of drug use include needle syringe programs, drug substitution programs, and free facilities for testing a drug's purity.

The concept of "drugs" –a substance subject to control– varies from jurisdiction to jurisdiction. For example, heroin is regulated almost everywhere; substances such as khat, codeine, or alcohol are regulated in some places, but not others. Most jurisdictions also regulate prescription drugs, medicinal drugs not considered dangerous but that can only be supplied to holders of a medical prescription, and sometimes drugs available without prescription but only from an approved supplier such as a pharmacy, but this is not usually described as a "drug policy". There are however some international standards as to which substances are under certain controls, in particular via the three international drug control conventions.

== Regulatory levers ==
Between authorisation and prohibition, there is a continuum of possible regulations. The Swiss Federal Commission for Issues relating to Addiction identified 26 levers for drug regulation, in 6 domains (production, distribution, marketing, taxation, price control and consumption):

Production

1. Production authorisation/reporting requirement
2. Quantitative restrictions on production/import
3. Qualitative restrictions on products
4. Types of sales outlets (e.g. pharmacies only)

Distribution

5. Sales authorisation required
6. Minimum age for sale (e.g. legal drinking age)
7. Restrictions on the number/density of sales outlets (e.g. casino licences)
8. Regulation of on-line sales channels
9. Restrictions on opening hours of points of sale (including vending machines)
10. Restrictions on product availability (e.g. no sale of alcohol to drunken persons)
11. Requirements for training of staff at points of sale
12. Information requirements (written)
13. Obligation to provide information (verbal)
14. Information for people with problematic consumption

Marketing

15. Declaration of ingredients on packaging
16. Warnings
17. Packaging requirements (e.g. dose and instructions)
18. Advertising restrictions

Taxes

19. Tax amount (e.g. alcohol tax)
20. Use of tax revenue (earmarking for health programmes)

Prices

21. Minimum price/prohibition on discounts
22. Fixed prices (e.g. medicines reimbursed by health insurance)

Consumption

23. Restrictions on consumption in certain places
24. Temporary restrictions on consumption
25. Restrictions on consumption in certain situations (e.g. driving or working)
26. Protection of third parties (e.g. against passive smoking)

For each of the 26 variables, the instruments is already in use today, at least for some substances.

== International drug control treaties ==
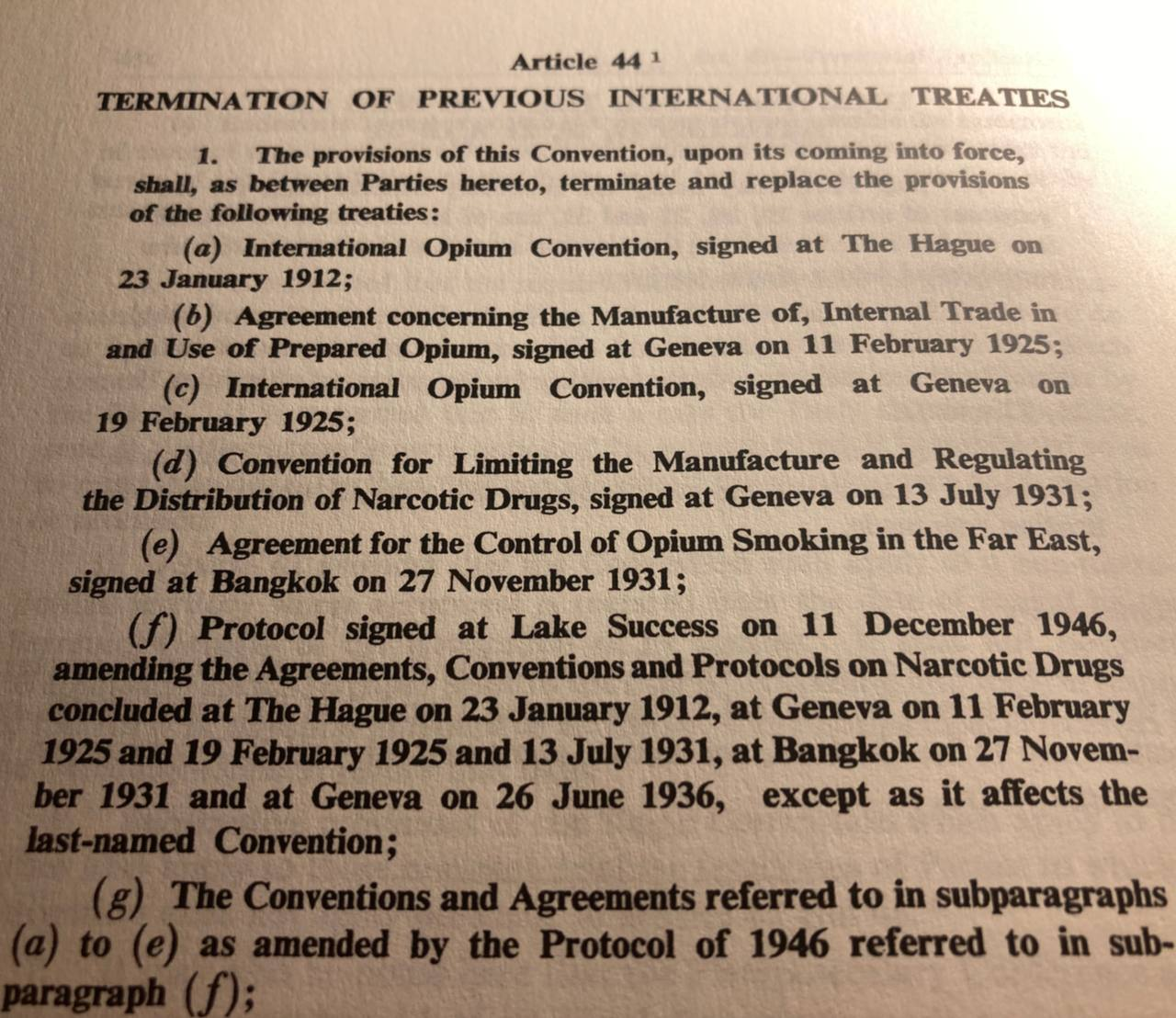
Article 44 of the 1961 Single Convention terminated a number of previous drug-control treaties.

=== History ===
The first international treaty to control a psychoactive substance was adopted at the Brussels Conference in 1890 in the context of the regulations against slave trade, and concerned alcoholic beverages. It was followed by the final act of the Shanghai Opium Commission of 1909 which attempted to settle peace and arrange the trade in opium, after the Opium Wars in the 19th Century.

In 1912 at the First International Opium Convention held in the Hague, the multilateral International Opium Convention was adopted; it ultimately got incorporated into the Treaty of Versailles in 1919. A number of international treaties related to drugs followed in subsequent decades: the 1925 Agreement concerning the Manufacture of, Internal Trade in and Use of Prepared Opium (which introduced some restrictions—but no total prohibition—on the export of "Indian hemp" pure extracts), the 1931 Convention for Limiting the Manufacture and Regulating the Distribution of Narcotic Drugs and Agreement for the Control of Opium Smoking in the Far East, the 1936 Convention for the Suppression of the Illicit Traffic in Dangerous Drugs, among others. After World War II, a series of Protocols signed at Lake Success brought into the mandate of the newly created United Nations these pre-war treaties which had been handled by the League of Nations and the Office international d'hygiène publique.

In 1961 the nine previous drug-control treaties in force were superseded by the 1961 Single Convention, which rationalized global control on drug trading and use. Countries commit to "protecting the health and welfare of [hu]mankind" and to combat substance abuse and addiction. The treaty is not a self-enforcing agreement: countries have to pass their own legislation aligned with the framework of the Convention. The 1961 Convention was supplemented by the 1971 Convention and the 1988 Convention, forming the three international drug control treaties upon which other legal instruments rely. Their implementation has been led by the United States, in particular after the Nixon administration's declaration of "war on drugs" in 1971, and the creation of the Drug Enforcement Administration (DEA) as a U.S. federal law enforcement agency in 1973.

Since the early 2000s the European Union (EU) has developed several comprehensive and multidisciplinary strategies as part of its drug policy to prevent the diffusion of recreational drug use and abuse among the European population and raise public awareness on the adverse effects of drugs among all member states of the European Union, as well as conjoined efforts with European law enforcement agencies, such as Europol and EMCDDA, to counter organized crime and illegal drug trade in Europe.

=== Current treaties ===
The core drug control treaties currently in force internationally are:

- the Single Convention on Narcotic Drugs, 1961 (1961 Convention or Single Convention) composed of:
  - the original Single Convention concluded at New York City (United States), 30 March 1961, and
  - its amendement, the Protocol amending the Single Convention on Narcotic Drugs which was adopted in Geneva (Switzerland), 25 March 1972,
- the Convention on Psychotropic Substances (1971 Convention), concluded at Vienna, 21 February 1971, and
- the UN Convention against Illicit Traffic in Narcotic Drugs and Psychotropic Substances (1988 Convention) concluded at Vienna (Austria), 20 December 1988.

There are other treaties that address drugs under international control, such as:

- the UN Convention on the Law of the Sea (UNCLOS), concluded on 10 December 1982 in Montego Bay (Jamaica),
- the Convention on the Rights of the Child (CRC), concluded on 20 November 1989 in New York City,
- the International Convention Against Doping in Sport concluded in Paris (France) on 19 October 2005.

Additionally, other pieces of international law enter into play, like the international human rights treaties protecting the right to health or the rights of indigenous peoples, and, in the case of plants considered as drug crops (coca plant, cannabis, opium poppy), treaties protecting the right to land, farmers' of peasants' rights, and treaties on plant genetic resources or traditional knowledge.

Former and current international drug control treaties
	Short name	Full name	Concluded		In force
Discontinued	First (Hague) Opium Convention	First International Opium Convention of 1925	The Hague	23 January 1912	1919–1946
Discontinued	1925 Geneva Opium Agreement	Agreement concerning the Manufacture of, Internal Trade in and Use of Prepared Opium	Geneva	11 February 1925	1926–1946
Discontinued	Second (Geneva) Opium Convention	Second International Opium Convention of 1925	Geneva	19 February 1925	1928–1946
Discontinued	Limitation Convention	Convention for Limiting the Manufacture and Regulating the Distribution of Narcotic Drugs	Geneva	13 July 1931	1933–1946
Discontinued	Bangkok Agreement	Agreement for the Control of Opium Smoking in the Far East	Bangkok	27 November 1931	1937–1946
Discontinued	Suppression Convention	Convention for the Suppression of the Illicit Traffic in Dangerous Drugs	Geneva	26 June 1936	1939–1946
Discontinued	Lake Success Protocol	Protocol Amending the Agreements, Conventions and Protocols on Narcotic Drugs concluded at The Hague on 23 January 1912, at Geneva on 11 February 1925 and 19 February 1925, and 13 July 1931, at Bangkok on 27 November 1931 and at Geneva on 26 June 1936	Lake Success	11 December 1946	1946–1968
Discontinued	Paris Protocol	Protocol Bringing under International Control Drugs outside the Scope of the Convention of 13 July 1931 for Limiting the Manufacture and Regulating the Distribution of Narcotic Drugs	Paris	19 November 1948	1946–1968
Discontinued	1953 Protocol	Protocol for Limiting and Regulating the Cultivation of the Poppy Plant, the Production of, International and Wholesale Trade in, and Use of Opium	New York City	23 June 1953	1963–?
Discontinued	Single Convention	Single Convention on Narcotic Drugs, 1961	New York City	30 March 1961	1968–1975
Current	1971 Convention	Convention on Psychotropic Substances	Vienna	21 February 1971	1976–present
Current	Single Convention as amended	Single Convention on Narcotic Drugs, 1961 as amended by the Protocol amending the Single Convention on Narcotic Drugs	Geneva	25 March 1972	1975–present
Current	1988 Convention	United Nations Convention Against Illicit Traffic in Narcotic Drugs and Psychotropic Substances	Vienna	20 December 1988	1990–present

=== Treaty-mandated organizations ===
There are four bodies mandated under the international drug control conventions (1961, 1971 and 1988):

- The Commission on Narcotic Drugs (CND), a subsidiary body of the United Nations ECOSOC, the CND is acting as a Conference of the parties to the three core Conventions,
- the UN Secretary-General, whose mandate is de facto carried on by the United Nations Office on Drugs and Crime (UNODC),
- the World Health Organization (WHO), in charge of the scientific review of substances for inclusion under, changes in, or withdrawal from control (scheduling assessment),
- the International Narcotics Control Board (INCB), the treaty-body monitoring implementation and collecting statistical data.

== Drug policy by country ==
=== Australia ===
Australian drug laws are criminal laws and mostly exist at the state and territory level, not the federal, and are therefore different, which means an analysis of trends and laws for Australia is complicated. The federal jurisdiction has enforcement powers over national borders.

In October 2016, Australia legislated for some medicinal use cannabis.

=== Bolivia ===
Like Colombia, the Bolivian government signed onto the ATPA in 1991 and called for the forced eradication of the coca plant in the 1990s and early 2000s. Until 2004, the government allowed each residential family to grow 1600m^{2} of coca crop, enough to provide the family with a monthly minimum wage. In 2005, Bolivia saw another reformist movement. The leader of a coca grower group, Evo Morales, was elected President in 2005. Morales ended any U.S. backed war on drugs. President Morales opposed the decriminalization of drugs but saw the coca crop as an important piece of indigenous history and a pillar of the community because of the traditional use of chewing coca leaves. In 2009, the Bolivian Constitution backed the legalization and industrialization of coca products.

Bolivia first proposed an amendment to the Single Convention on Narcotic Drugs in 2009. After its failure, Bolivia left the convention and re-accessed with a reservation for coca leaf in its natural form.

=== Colombia ===
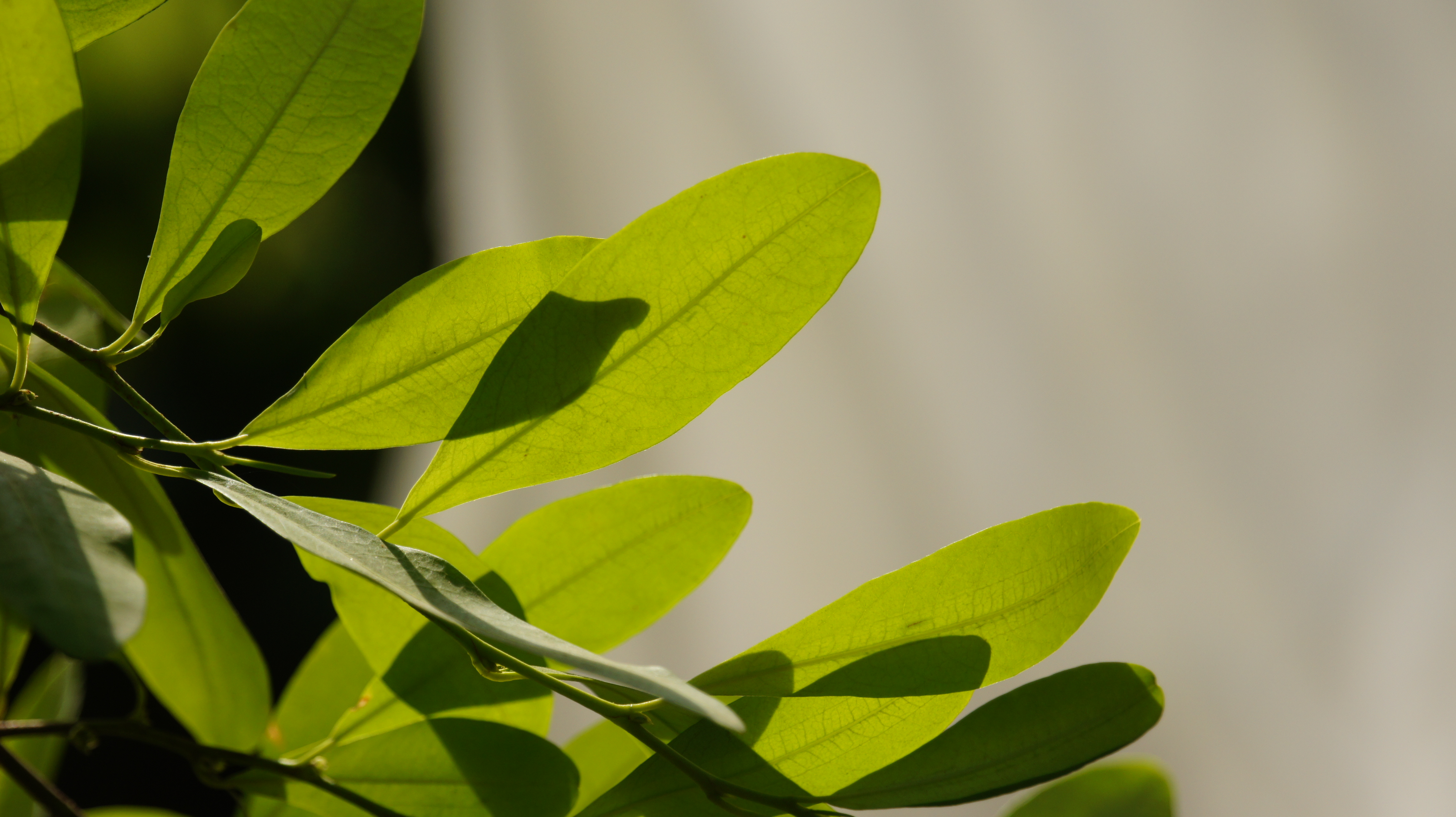
Coca plant

Under President Ronald Reagan, the United States declared war on drugs in the late 1980s; the Colombian drug lords were widely viewed as the root of the cocaine issue in America. In the 1990s, Colombia was home to the world's two largest drug cartels: the Cali cartel and the Medellín cartel. It became Colombia's priority, as well as the priority of the other countries in the Andean Region, to extinguish the cartels and drug trafficking from the region. In 1999, under President Andrés Pastrana, Colombia passed Plan Colombia. Plan Colombia funded the Andean Region's fight against the drug cartels and drug trafficking. With the implementation of Plan Colombia, the Colombian government aimed to destroy the coca crop. This prohibitionist regime has had controversial results, especially on human rights. Colombia has seen a significant decrease in coca cultivation. In 2001, there were 362,000 acres of coca crop in Colombia; by 2011, fewer than 130,000 acres remained. However, farmers who cultivated the coca crop for uses other than for the creation of cocaine, such as the traditional use of chewing coca leaves, became impoverished.

Since 1994, consumption of drugs has been decriminalized. However, possession and trafficking of drugs are still illegal. In 2014, Colombia further eased its prohibitionist stance on the coca crop by ceasing aerial fumigation of the coca crop and creating programs for addicts. President Juan Manuel Santos (2010–2018), has called for the revision of Latin American drug policy, and was open to talks about legalization.

=== Ecuador ===
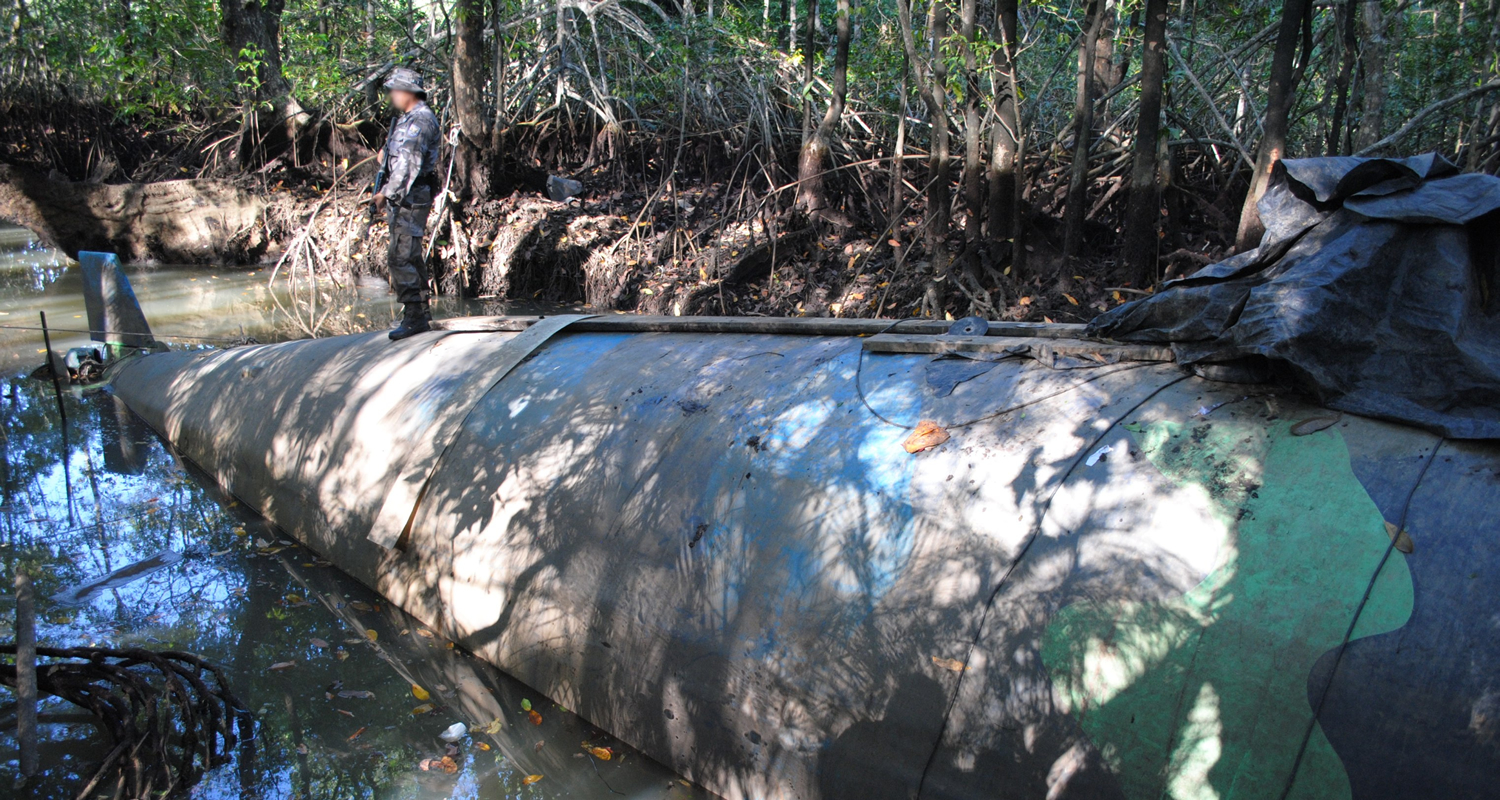
Narco submarine seized in Ecuador

In the mid-1980s, under President León Febres-Cordero, Ecuador adopted the prohibitionist drug policy recommended by the United States. By cooperating with the United States, Ecuador received tariff exemptions from the United States. In February 1990, the United States held the Cartagena Drug Summit, in the hopes of continuing progress on the war on drugs. Three of the four countries in the Andean Region were invited to the Summit: Peru, Colombia and Bolivia, with the notable absence of Ecuador. Two of those three countries—Colombia and Bolivia—joined the Andean Trade Preference Act, later called the Andean Trade Promotion and Drug Eradication Act, in 1992. Ecuador, along with Peru, would eventually join the ATPA in 1993. The Act united the region in the war on drugs as well as stimulated their economies with tariff exemptions.

In 1991, President Rodrigo Borja Cevallos passed Law 108, a law that decriminalized drug use, while continuing to prosecute drug possession. In reality, Law 108 set a trap that snared many citizens. Citizens confused the legality of use with the illegality of carrying drugs on their person. This led to a large increase in prison populations, as 100% of drug crimes were processed. In 2007, 18,000 prisoners were kept in a prison built to hold up to 7,000. In urban regions of Ecuador as many as 45% of male inmates were serving time for drug charges; this prison demographic rises to 80% of female inmates. In 2008, under Ecuador's new Constitution, current prisoners serving time were allowed the "smuggler pardon" if they were prosecuted for purchasing or carrying up to 2 kg of any drug, and they already served 10% of their sentence. Later, in 2009, Law 108 was replaced by the Organic Penal Code (COIP). The COIP contains many of the same rules and regulations as Law 108, but it established clear distinctions among large, medium and small drug traffickers, as well as between the mafia and rural growers, and prosecutes accordingly. In 2013, the Ecuadorian government left the Andean Trade Promotion and Drug Eradication Act.

=== Germany ===
Compared with other EU countries, Germany's drug policy is considered progressive, but still stricter than, for example, the Netherlands. In 1994 the Federal Constitutional Court ruled that drug addiction was not a crime, nor was the possession of small amounts of drugs for personal use. In 2000, Germany amended its Narcotic Drugs Act ("BtmG") to allow supervised drug injection rooms. In 2002, they started a pilot study in seven German cities to evaluate the effects of heroin-assisted treatment on addicts, compared to methadone-assisted treatment. The positive results of the study led to the inclusion of heroin-assisted treatment into the services of the mandatory health insurance in 2009.

In 2017, Germany re-allowed medical cannabis; after the 2021 German federal election, the new government announced in their coalition agreement their intention to legalise cannabis for all other purposes (including recreational). This was implemented on 1 April 2024. Cannabis can be legally acquired from Cannabis Social Clubs which however have periodic membership fees and a maximum 500 of members as of 2024 or be grown by consumers themselves who can have up to three plants.

In March 2023, the former health minister, Karl Lauterbach, reported a positive reaction from European Commission on the plan, and intended to bring a bill forward soon.

The finalised bill received approval of the governing parties on 2 February 2024. The Bundestag passed the bill on 23 February 2024, and the Bundesrat approved it on 22 March, with the national legalisation to follow by 1 April. The final bill legislates that adults in Germany (those aged 18 and over) can legally use cannabis, possess and carry up to 25 grams (7/8 oz) of cannabis for personal possession in public and have up to 50 grams (1 3/4 oz) of dried cannabis at home. The legislation states that adults have a maximum purchase limit of 25 grams of cannabis a day and a monthly maximum purchase limit of 50 grams of cannabis. Each individual adult in Germany can also have up to three of their own cannabis plants at home. From 1 July 2024, adult residents of Germany will be allowed to join adult-only non-profit cannabis social clubs in Germany, with a maximum membership of 500. These cannabis social clubs will require permits. Consumption of cannabis inside and in a radius of less of 100 m from the entrances of schools, kindergartens, public playgrounds, public sports facilities, as well as in presence of minors and, between 7 am and 8 pm, in pedestrian zones in city centers will not be allowed.

=== Indonesia ===
Like many other governments in Southeast Asia, the Indonesian government applies severe laws to discourage drug use.

=== Liberia ===
Liberia prohibits drugs such as cocaine and marijuana. Its drug laws are enforced by the Liberia Drug Enforcement Agency.

=== Netherlands ===
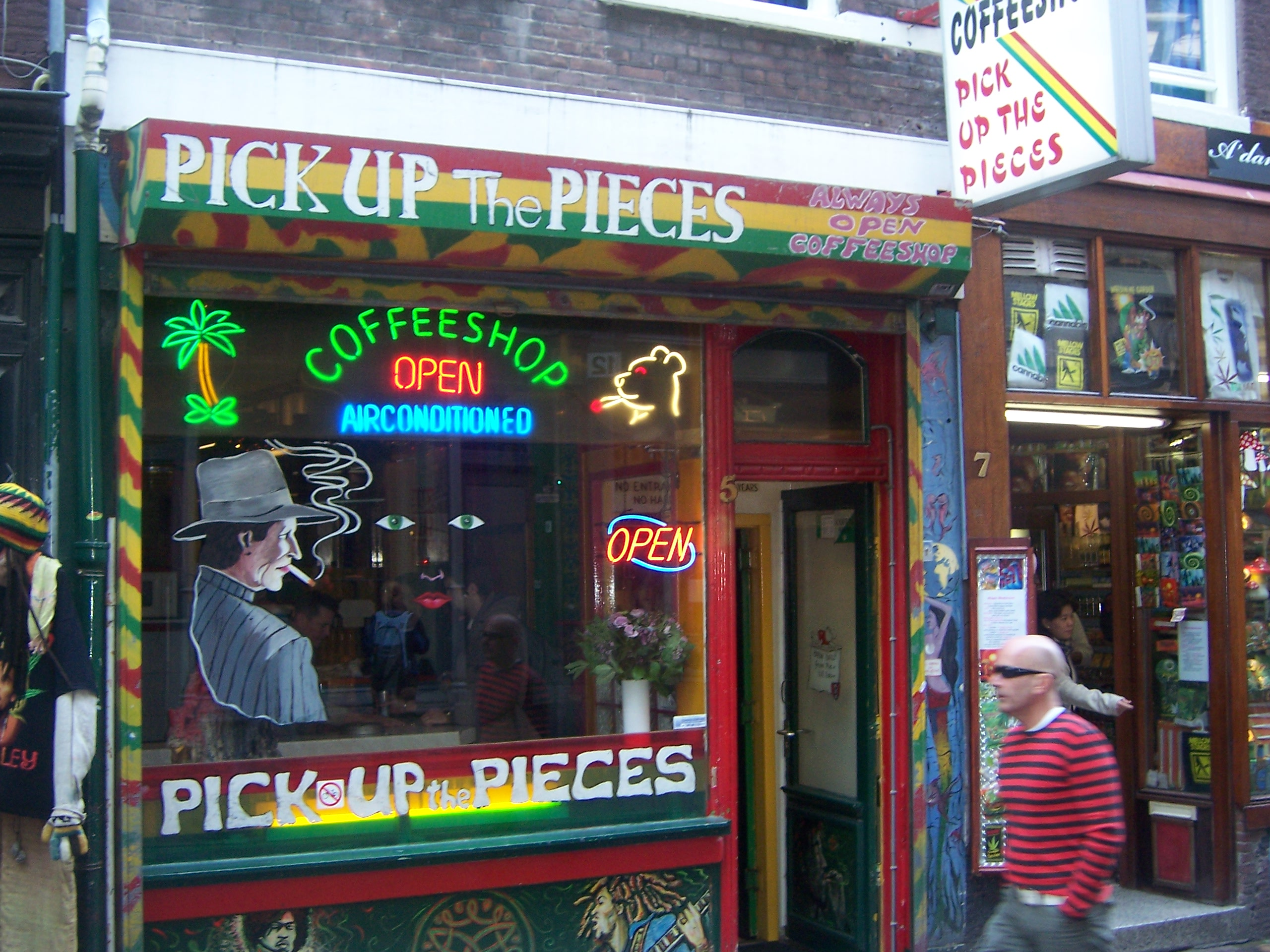
Cannabis coffee shop in the city center of Amsterdam, Netherlands

Drug policy in the Netherlands is based on two principles: that drug use is a health issue, not a criminal issue, and that there is a distinction between hard and soft drugs. It was also one of the first countries to introduce heroin-assisted treatment and safe injection sites. From 2008, a number of town councils have closed many so called coffee shops that sold cannabis or implemented other new restrictions for sale of cannabis, e.g. for foreigners.

Importing and exporting of any classified drug is a serious offence. The penalty can run up to 12 to 16 years if it is for hard drugs, or a maximum of 4 years for importing or exporting large quantities of cannabis. Investment in treatment and prevention of drug addiction is high when compared to the rest of the world. The Netherlands spends significantly more per capita than all other countries in the EU on drug law enforcement. 75% of drug-related public spending is on law enforcement. Drug use remains at average Western European levels and slightly lower than in English speaking countries.

=== Peru ===
According to article 8 of the Constitution of Peru, the state is responsible for battling and punishing drug trafficking. Likewise, it regulates the use of intoxicants. Consumption of drugs is not penalized and possession is allowed for small quantities only. Production and distribution of drugs are illegal.

In 1993, Peru, along with Ecuador, signed the Andean Trade Preference Agreement with the United States, later replaced with the Andean Trade Promotion and Drug Eradication Act. Bolivia and Colombia had already signed the ATPA in 1991, and began enjoying its benefits in 1992. By agreeing to the terms of this Agreement, these countries worked in concert with the United States to fight drug trafficking and production at the source. The Act aimed to substitute the production of the coca plant with other agricultural products. In return for their efforts towards eradication of the coca plant, the countries were granted U.S. tariff exemptions on certain products, such as certain types of fruit. Peru ceased complying with the ATPA in 2012, and lost all tariff exemptions previously granted by the United States through the ATPA. By the end of 2012, Peru overtook Colombia as the world's largest cultivator of the coca plant.

=== Portugal ===
In July 2001, a law maintained the status of illegality for using or possessing any drug for personal use without authorization. The offense was however changed from a criminal one, with prison a possible punishment, to an administrative one if the possessing was no more than up to ten days' supply of that substance. This was in line with the de facto Portuguese drug policy before the reform. Drug addicts were then aggressively targeted with therapy or community service rather than fines or waivers. Even if there are no criminal penalties, these changes did not legalize drug use in Portugal. Possession has remained prohibited by Portuguese law, and criminal penalties are still applied to drug growers, dealers and traffickers.

=== Russia ===
Drugs became popular in Russia among soldiers and the homeless, particularly due to the First World War. This included morphine-based drugs and cocaine, which were readily available. The government under Tsar Nicholas II of Russia had outlawed alcohol in 1914 (including vodka) as a temporary measure until the conclusion of the War. Following the Russian Revolution and in particular the October Revolution and the Russian Civil War, the Bolsheviks emerged victorious as the new political power in Russia. The Soviet Union inherited a population with widespread drug addiction, and in the 1920s, tried to tackle it by introducing a 10-year prison sentence for drug-dealers. The Bolsheviks also decided in August 1924 to re-introduce the sale of vodka, which, being more readily available, led to a drop in drug-use.

=== Sweden ===
Sweden's drug policy has gradually turned from lenient in the 1960s with an emphasis on drug supply towards a policy of zero tolerance against all illicit drug use (including cannabis). The official aim is a drug-free society. Drug use became a punishable crime in 1988. Personal use does not result in jail time if not combined with driving a car. Prevention includes widespread drug testing, and penalties range from fines for minor drug offenses up to a 10-year prison sentence for aggravated offenses. The condition for suspended sentences could be regular drug tests or submission to rehabilitation treatment. Drug treatment is free of charge and provided through the health care system and the municipal social services. Drug use that threatens the health and development of minors could force them into mandatory treatment if they don't apply voluntarily. If the use threatens the immediate health or the security of others (such as a child of an addict) the same could apply to adults.

Among 9th year students, drug experimentation was highest in the early 1970s, falling towards a low in the late 1980s, redoubling in the 1990s to stabilize and slowly decline in 2000s. Estimates of heavy drug addicts have risen from 6000 in 1967 to 15000 in 1979, 19000 in 1992 and 26000 in 1998. According to inpatient data, there were 28000 such addicts in 2001 and 26000 in 2004, but these last two figures may represent the recent trend in Sweden towards out-patient treatment of drug addicts rather than an actual decline in drug addictions.

The United Nations Office on Drugs and Crime (UNODC) reports that Sweden has one of the lowest drug use rates in the Western world, and attributes this to a drug policy that invests heavily in prevention and treatment as well as strict law enforcement. The general drug policy is supported by all political parties and, according to opinion polls made in the mid 2000s, the restrictive approach received broad support from the public at that time.

=== Switzerland ===
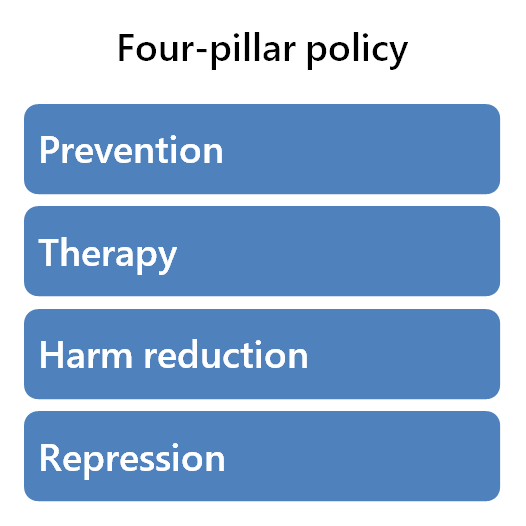
The 4 pillars of Switzerland's drug policy: prevention, treatment, harm reduction and repression. The 4 pillars were firsts adopted by the government in 1991; they entered the law in 2008.

The national drug policy of Switzerland was developed in the early 1990s and comprises the four elements of prevention, therapy, harm reduction and prohibition. In 1994 Switzerland was one of the first countries to try heroin-assisted treatment and other harm reduction measures like supervised injection rooms. In 2008 a popular initiative by the right wing Swiss People's Party aimed at ending the heroin program was rejected by more than two-thirds of the voters. A simultaneous initiative aimed at legalizing marijuana was rejected at the same ballot.

Between 1987 and 1992, illegal drug use and sales were permitted in Platzspitz park, Zurich, in an attempt to counter the growing heroin problem. However, as the situation grew increasingly out of control, authorities were forced to close the park.

In 2022, Switzerland initiated pilot trials for the non-medical use of cannabis.

=== Thailand ===
Thailand has a strict drug policy. The use, storage, transportation and distribution of drugs is illegal. In 2021, Thailand unified all the laws on narcotic, psychoactive substances, and inhalants into the Narcotic Code 2564 BE (2021 AD) with more relaxing policy. The sentence of many criminal offenses relating to narcotic was reduced as the new law focuses more on drug rehabilitation. According to the Narcotic Code, narcotic substances are divided into 5 categories.

- Category I – highly addictive narcotic such as heroin, amphetamines, methamphetamines, etc.
- Category II – highly addictive narcotic with medical use such as morphine, cocaine, ketamine, codeine, medicinal opium (opium extracts or products), etc.
- Category III – drug formularies that legally contain the category II narcotic, etc.
- Category IV – chemicals used for synthesizing the categories I and II narcotic such as acetic anhydride, acetyl chloride, etc.
- Category V – narcotic plants such as opium poppy, magic mushroom, cannabis extracts with THC higher than 0.2% by weight and cannabis seed extracts.

With the current law, kratom and cannabis plant no longer belong to the category V narcotic. They are no longer considered narcotic plants. However, plantation, possession, distribution, and use of these plants are still controlled by certain level of permission and regulations.

It is also illegal to import more than 200 cigarettes per person to Thailand. Control takes place at customs at the airport. If the limit has been exceeded, the owner can be fined up to ten times the cost of cigarettes.

In January 2018, Thai authorities imposed a ban on smoking on beaches in some tourist areas. Those who smoke in public places can be punished with a fine of 100,000 Baht or imprisonment for up to one year. It is forbidden to import electronic cigarettes into Thailand. These items are likely to be confiscated, and you can be fined or sent to prison for up to 10 years. The sale or supply of electronic cigarettes and similar devices is also prohibited and is punishable by a fine or imprisonment of up to 5 years.

It is worth noting that most people arrested for possessing a small amount of substances from the V-th category are fined and not imprisoned. At present, in Thailand, the anti-drug police are considering methamphetamines as a more serious and dangerous problem.

On 9 February 2024 the Public Health Ministry published possession limits for many illicit drugs. This means if you possess a small amount of an illegal drug, you have to go to a rehabilitation program, instead of imprisonment. This marks another progressive step in Thailand's drug policy.

=== Ukraine ===
Crimes in the sphere of trafficking in narcotic, psychotropic substances and crimes against health are classified using the 13th section of the Criminal Code of Ukraine; articles from 305 to 327.

According to official statistics for 2016, 53% of crimes in the field of drugs fall on art. 309 of the Criminal Code of Ukraine: "illegal production, manufacture, acquisition, storage, transportation or shipment of narcotic drugs, psychotropic substances or their analogues without the purpose of sale".

Sentence for crime:

- fine of fifty to one hundred non-taxable minimum incomes of citizens;
- or correctional labor for up to two years;
- or arrest for up to six months, or restriction of liberty for up to three years;
- or imprisonment for the same term.

On 28 August 2013, the Cabinet of Ministers of Ukraine adopted a strategy for state policy on drugs until 2020. This is the first document of this kind in Ukraine. The strategy developed by the State Drug Control Service, involves strengthening criminal liability for distributing large amounts of drugs, and easing the penalty for possession of small doses. Thanks to this strategy, it is planned to reduce the number of injecting drug users by 20% by 2020, and the number of drug overdose deaths by 30%.

In October 2018, the State Service of Ukraine on Drugs and Drug Control issued the first license for the import and re-export of raw materials and products derived from cannabis. The corresponding licenses were obtained by the USA company C21. She is also in the process of applying for additional licenses, including the cultivation of hemp.

=== United Kingdom ===
Drugs considered addictive or dangerous in the United Kingdom (with the exception of tobacco and alcohol) are called "controlled substances" and regulated by law. Until 1964 the medical treatment of dependent drug users was separated from the punishment of unregulated use and supply. This arrangement was confirmed by the Rolleston Committee in 1926. This policy on drugs, known as the "British system", was maintained in Britain, and nowhere else, until the 1960s. Under this policy drug use remained low; there was relatively little recreational use and few dependent users, who were prescribed drugs by their doctors as part of their treatment. From 1964 drug use was increasingly criminalised, with the framework still in place as of 2014 largely determined by the 1971 Misuse of Drugs Act.

=== United States ===
Modern US drug policy still has roots in the war on drugs started by president Richard Nixon in 1971. In the United States, illegal drugs fall into different categories and punishment for possession and dealing varies on amount and type. Punishment for marijuana possession is light in most states, but punishment for dealing and possession of hard drugs can be severe, and has contributed to the growth of the prison population.

US drug policy is also heavily invested in foreign policy, supporting military and paramilitary actions in South America, Central Asia, and other places to eradicate the growth of coca and opium. In Colombia, U.S. president Bill Clinton dispatched military and paramilitary personnel to interdict the planting of coca, as a part of the Plan Colombia. The project is often criticized for its ineffectiveness and its negative impact on local farmers, but it has been effective in destroying the once-powerful drug cartels and guerrilla groups of Colombia. President George W. Bush intensified anti-drug efforts in Mexico, initiating the Mérida Initiative, but has faced criticisms for similar reasons.

21 May 2012 the U.S Government published an updated version of its Drug Policy The director of ONDCP stated simultaneously that this policy is something different from "War on Drugs":

- The U.S Government see the policy as a "third way" approach to drug control one that is based on the results of a huge investment in research from some of the world's preeminent scholars on disease of substance abuse.
- The policy does not see drug legalization as the "silver bullet" solution to drug control.
- It is not a policy where success is measured by the number of arrests made or prisons built.

The U.S. government generates grants to develop and disseminate evidence based addiction treatments. These grants have developed several practices that NIDA endorses, such as community reinforcement approach and community reinforcement and family training approach, which are behavior therapy interventions.

== See also ==
- Cannabis rights
- Chasing the Scream
- Drug checking
- Drug liberalization
- Drug policy reform
- Harm reduction
- Legality of cannabis
- Maintenance dose
- Psilocybin decriminalization in the United States
- Supervised injection site
