= International drug convention =

"International drug convention" could mean any of several international conventions:

- the 1912 First International Opium Convention
- the 1925 Second International Opium Convention
- the 1925 Agreement concerning the Manufacture of, Internal Trade in and Use of Prepared Opium
- the 1931 Convention for Limiting the Manufacture and Regulating the Distribution of Narcotic Drugs
- the 1931 Agreement for the Control of Opium Smoking in the Far East
- the 1961 Single Convention on Narcotic Drugs
- the 1971 Convention on Psychotropic Substances
- the 1988 United Nations Convention Against Illicit Traffic in Narcotic Drugs and Psychotropic Substances
