= Drug law (disambiguation) =

A drug law may refer to:

- the prohibition of drugs
- drug policies other than the prohibition of drugs
- the regulation of therapeutic goods
