= Geneva Protocol (disambiguation) =

Geneva Protocol generally refers to the Protocol for the Prohibition of the Use in War of Asphyxiating, Poisonous or other Gases, and of Bacteriological Methods of Warfare, signed in 1925.

Geneva protocol may also refer to:

- Geneva Protocol (1924), the Geneva Protocol for the Pacific Settlement of International Disputes
- Agreement concerning the Manufacture of, Internal Trade in and Use of Prepared Opium (1925) sometimes called Geneva Opium Protocol
- Geneva Protocol on Road Signs and Signals, part of the 1949 Geneva Convention on Road Traffic
- Geneva Conventions (1949)
  - Geneva Protocol I (a 1977 amendment to the Geneva Conventions, relating to the protection of victims of international armed conflicts)
  - Geneva Protocol II (a 1977 amendment to the Geneva Conventions, relating to the protection of victims of non-international armed conflicts)
  - Geneva Protocol III (a 2005 amendment to the Geneva Conventions, relating to the adoption of an additional Distinctive Emblem)
