= Mark Penn =

American political strategist (born 1954)

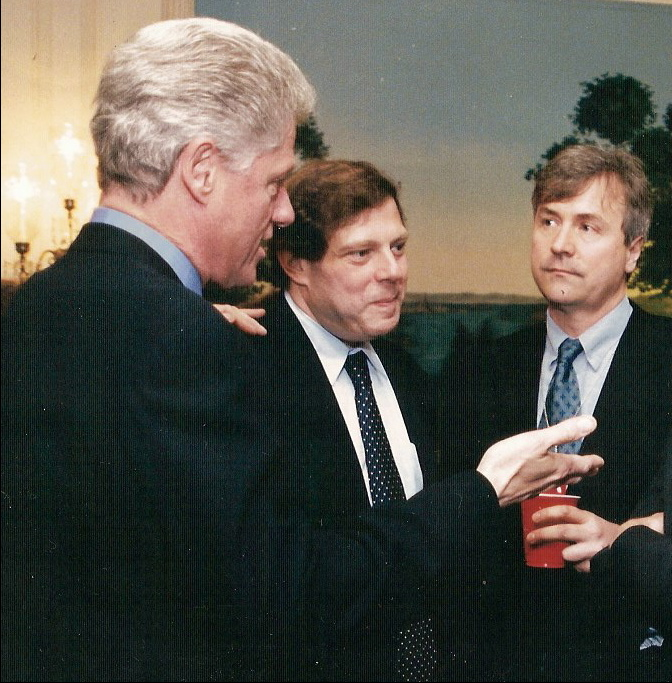
- Bill Clinton (left) with Penn (center) and David Talbot (right), White House, 1998
- Born: January 15, 1954 (age 72); New York City, U.S.
- Education: Harvard University (BA); Columbia University (JD)
- Employer: Stagwell
- Spouse: Nancy Jacobson
- Children: 4
- Website: Official website

Mark J. Penn (born January 15, 1954) is an American businessman, pollster, political strategist, and author.

Penn is chairman and chief executive officer of Stagwell, a marketing group. He was formerly chief strategy officer of Microsoft Corporation and chief executive officer of Burson-Marsteller. Penn is the author of the books Microtrends (2007) and Microtrends Squared (2018).

Together with Douglas Schoen, he was co-founder of the polling firm PSB Research, whose clients included President Bill Clinton, British prime minister Tony Blair, and Bill Gates. Penn was a chief strategist and pollster in the Hillary Clinton 2008 presidential campaign. Penn later advised Donald Trump on impeachment proceedings against him.

== Early life and education ==
Penn was born in New York City and raised in Riverdale. His father, a Lithuanian immigrant, was a kosher poultry-plant owner, who died when Penn was 10 years old. He was raised by his mother Blanche, who worked as a schoolteacher. Both of his brothers credit Penn with keeping the family together after their father's death. Penn graduated from Horace Mann School in Riverdale in 1972. He conducted his first poll, which determined that the Horace Mann faculty was more liberal than was the country at large on the issue of civil rights, when he was 13, as well as polling classmates about sex and drugs.

Penn entered Harvard University in 1972. According to his brother, Penn was initially rejected, but he was able to get Harvard's dean to reverse the decision after taking the train to Boston and arguing his case. At Harvard, Penn majored in political science and, as a city editor of the Harvard Crimson, wrote and reported 90 articles. His work for the paper included reporting and analysis on buying a stereo, the Cambridge City Council elections of 1975, the Harvard admission process, and the controversy over the proposed construction in Cambridge of the John F. Kennedy Library. With Horace Mann School classmate Douglas Schoen, Penn co-founded Penn & Schoen – now the global market research firm Penn, Schoen & Berland Associates. He graduated from Harvard in 1976.

== Early political campaigns ==
=== Ed Koch mayoral campaign of 1977 and 1985 ===
While Penn was a first-year law student at Columbia University in 1976, he and his business partner Douglas Schoen became the pollsters for congressman Ed Koch's second run for mayor of New York City. In 1977, with the campaign against Mario Cuomo for the Democratic nomination in full swing, Penn sought a way to conduct polls more quickly than the mainframe and punched card system he and Schoen were making use of at Columbia University. He purchased a self-assembled "microcomputer" kit and created a program that could compile polls in a fraction of the time than had been done before. By creating this "overnight poll" system, Penn allowed the campaign to conduct polls to determine messages and evaluate tactics on a daily basis, a tactical advantage that contributed to Koch's eventual victory over Cuomo.

Penn also played a significant role in Koch's campaign during the 1985 New York City mayoral election, for which he and Schoen developed direct mailings, set up phone banks, organized volunteers and canvassers, and coordinated fundraising. That year, Koch won both the Democratic primary and the general election, defeating New York City Council President Carol Bellamy.

=== Luis Herrera Campins presidential campaign of 1978 and Latin American politics ===
In 1978, Penn conducted polling for the presidential campaign of Luis Herrera Campins in Venezuela. Because Venezuela did not at that time have universal phone coverage, Penn partnered with Venezuelan polling firms to go door-to-door to collect interviews. He also helped the campaign develop the slogan "Ya Basta," or "Enough," critical of the incumbent party's spending policies. Herrera carried the election by about 3%.

The election marked the beginning of Penn's successful involvement in Latin American politics. Since 1979, Penn's firm has helped elect more than a half dozen heads of state in Latin America, including Venezuela's Carlos Andrés Pérez, Belisario Betancur and Virgilio Barco Vargas of Colombia, and Leonel Fernández of the Dominican Republic.

=== Menachem Begin 1981 campaign for prime minister ===
In 1981, Penn & Schoen conducted polling for Menachem Begin's campaign for re-election as Prime Minister of Israel. When Begin called Penn in January 1981, public polling for the June parliamentary election showed that Begin's party, Likud, would lose the elections by a margin of 58 seats for the rival Labor Party to 20 seats for Begin's Likud party. A New York Times article published in March of that year stated that Begin was "probably in his final months as Prime Minister." Penn & Schoen applied the rapid polling techniques they had developed on Ed Koch's first campaign for mayor to provide Begin with a daily understanding of attitudes of the Israeli electorate. Ultimately, Begin defeated Labor, led by Shimon Peres, by 10,405 votes out of more than 1.5 million cast.

== Corporate work ==
In the late 1980s, Penn was the force behind his firm's drive to win corporate consulting clients. Texaco, which was experiencing image problems due to bankruptcy after the Pennzoil v. Texaco court case, was the firm's first major corporate client.

In 1993, Penn, Schoen & Berland was engaged by AT&T's new advertising agency FCB to guide a response to the "Friends and Family" plan offered by MCI, a then-upstart competitor for AT&T's long-distance services. To help AT&T understand how best to counter MCI's strongest messages, Penn created the "mall testing" methodology for competitive advertising research. In the mall tests, Penn showed randomly selected mall shoppers MCI ads head-to-head with proposed new AT&T ads. Using this methodology, Penn's firm determined messages resulting in AT&T's "True" plan and its $200 million advertising campaign. As a result of this campaign, by the end of 1994, AT&T had signed up 14 million new long-distance customers.

Penn has been a strategic advisor to Bill Gates and Microsoft since the mid-1990s. Penn began working with Microsoft when the company faced antitrust litigation initiated by the U.S. Department of Justice. Penn also created the famous "blue sweater" advertisement that featured Gates, which were intended to restore trust in the company amid the antitrust litigation. In 2006, a survey of global opinion leaders found that Microsoft was the world's most trusted company, an accomplishment which The Wall Street Journal partially attributed to Penn's advice.

His other corporate clients have included Ford Motor Company, Merck & Co., Verizon, BP, and McDonald's.

=== Microsoft Corporation ===
In July 2012, Penn was named Corporate Vice President for Strategic and Special Projects at Microsoft Corporation. Shortly after he came on board, he began a public relations campaign against Google on behalf of Bing. Just in time for the holiday shopping season, he created a commercial in which Microsoft criticized Google for biasing its shopping search results with paid advertisements. "Don't get Scroogled", the commercial warned. In August 2013, Penn was named Executive Vice President for Advertising and Strategy. In that role, he pioneered Microsoft's "Honestly" campaign and the award-winning Super Bowl 2014 ad "Empowering Us All". In March 2014, he was named executive vice president and chief strategy officer by chief executive officer Satya Nadella. On June 17, 2015, it was announced he would be leaving Microsoft.

=== The Stagwell Group ===
After leaving Microsoft, Penn founded The Stagwell Group, a private equity firm that invests in marketing services agencies with a $250 million investment from former Microsoft chief executive officer Steve Ballmer.

In May 2016, Penn told The Wall Street Journal that he wanted to create a "more digitally-focused advertising holding group, made up of companies which do not overlap in function," and offer a "fully-integrated solution across the continuum of marketing services." In 2023, Penn stated that his "political background brings a much-needed perspective to marketing." He described his philosophy as that in today's real-time, data-focused world, brands must have a constant finger on the pulse of the American consumer.

In October 2015, Stagwell Group struck a deal worth up to $75 million to buy SKDKnickerbocker. In January 2017, the Stagwell Group acquired the Harris Poll from Nielsen Holdings and renamed it Harris Insights & Analytics. The firm has also acquired National Research Group, digital creative firm Code and Theory, media agency ForwardPMX, and marketing communications companies SKDK and Targeted Victory, among others.

=== Stagwell Inc. ===
In August 2021, Penn merged the Stagwell Group with MDC Partners to form Stagwell Inc. Stagwell (Nasdaq: STGW) has offices in 35 countries and over 13,000 employees with its headquarters in New York City. Stagwell companies include GALE, Code and Theory, Harris Poll, Anomaly, Doner, Assembly, 72 and Sunny, etc. In February 2022, Penn announced the formation of the Stagwell Marketing Cloud. Penn, alongside Victor Ganzi, Josh Harris, James Tisch, and Thomas Peterffy, contributed to a $50 million investment fund in The Messenger, a news website that launched in May 2023. Stagwell entered the Fortune 1000 during Penn's tenure. As of summer 2023, Stagwell stock had more than tripled since Penn took the CEO role.

== President Bill Clinton (1994–2000) ==
In 1994, President Bill Clinton hired Penn & Schoen to help his administration recover from the Democratic Party's dramatic losses during that year's midterm elections. The pollsters urged Clinton to move to the center, emphasizing stepped-up law enforcement, balancing the budget, and other issues.

Penn served as pollster to Clinton for six years. During that time, he became one of Clinton's most prominent and influential advisers. In 2000, the Washington Post concluded in a news analysis that no pollster had ever become "so thoroughly integrated into the policymaking operation" of a presidential administration as had Penn.

=== U.S. federal government shutdown of 1995 ===
Beginning in August 1995, at Clinton's request, Penn conducted numerous polls to understand what the political ramifications would be if the federal government were to shut down over disagreement between the legislative and executive branches over the budget. Penn tested many different scenarios for Clinton, and in each case the research showed that the American public would back the President and blame Republicans if the government shut down. On November 14, 1995, with no budget signed, major portions of the federal government became inoperative. They were restored by the passage of a temporary spending bill a few days later, but on December 16, 1995, the federal government again shut down, this time for a period of 21 days. Ultimately, Speaker of the House Newt Gingrich and the Republican-controlled Congress bore much of the political fallout for the shutdown, vindicating Penn's polling.

=== 1996 presidential campaign ===
During Clinton's 1996 reelection campaign, Penn used the mall tests he developed for AT&T to test presidential campaign ads. He also created the "NeuroPersonality Poll," a survey that blended standard political and demographic questions with lifestyle, attitudinal, and psychographic questions, some adapted from Myers-Briggs. Penn's 1996 Neuro Poll helped him identify a new swing voter: the "soccer mom." Previously, pollsters had thought that the defining voter variables were things such as age and income. But Penn argued that marital status was also a key defining variable. He found that the gap was even wider among voters with children at home: parents were 10–15 points more likely to lean Republican. Based on this analysis, Penn urged Clinton to focus on policies that appealed to suburban parents and to speak about these policies in terms of values rather than economics. He subsequently became famous for focusing on the "soccer mom", cited as the key swing vote that helped Clinton get reelected in 1996.

=== Second term ===
After the election, and for most of Clinton's second term, Penn and Schoen were hired to conduct 2–4 White House polls per month and met weekly with the President and the White House staff in the residence to review polls and policy ideas. These polls influenced Clinton's thinking and helped to refine his "new Democrat" language and policies that are one of his distinctive political contributions.

=== Impeachment trial ===
When allegations of Clinton's extramarital affair with Monica Lewinsky first surfaced in January 1998, Penn conducted polls to help the administration craft its response. Penn subsequently led the research effort monitoring Clinton's level of public support throughout the impeachment proceedings against him and until Clinton was acquitted on February 13, 1999.

== Hillary Clinton ==
=== 2000 and 2006 Senate campaigns ===
In 2000, then-First Lady Hillary Clinton asked Penn to advise her on her run for the U.S. Senate from New York. During the campaign, tension brewed between Penn, who urged Clinton to focus on the issues, and other advisers, who urged Clinton to focus more on personality. Clinton followed Penn's advice and won the election. Penn served again as Clinton's pollster in her successful 2006 Senate reelection campaign.

=== 2008 presidential campaign ===
Until April 6, 2008, he served as chief strategist to Hillary Clinton's campaign for president. Penn and his colleagues held differences of opinion over how much to "humanize" Clinton, with Penn arguing that the vast majority of voters cared more about substance than style. According to New York Times columnist Frank Rich, Penn and his wife, Nancy Jacobson, "helped brand the Hillary Clinton presidential campaign as a depository for special-interest contributions." An NPR interview notes how much greater Mark Penn's business conflicts of interest were in comparison to other recent top campaign advisors like David Axelrod and Karl Rove.

Penn laid out his "strategy for winning" in a March 19, 2007, memo to the campaign. According to the memo, Penn believed Clinton's victory would be built upon a coalition of voters he called "Invisible Americans", a sort of reprise of Bill Clinton's "forgotten middle class", which would be composed of women and lower and middle class voters. Eventually it was this coalition that she ended up winning a year later. Penn wrote the "3 AM" advertisement that ran during the campaign, which was later named one of Time's top 10 political ads of all time and was parodied on The Simpsons.

Penn advised Clinton not to apologize for voting for the Iraq War, insisting that "It's important for all Democrats to keep the word 'mistake' firmly on the Republicans." Clinton followed this strategy. She would only apologize six years later in 2014.

Clinton was the front-runner in the early months of the Democratic primary, but in January 2008 she lost the Iowa caucus to then-Senator Barack Obama. On April 6, 2008, Penn agreed to step down as chief strategist when it was disclosed that he met with representatives of Colombia's government in his role as the CEO of Burson Marsteller, a firm hired to lobby on Colombia's behalf, creating a scandal for Clinton's campaign. It was suggested that he would remain in a similar though less formal role until the end of the campaign. As Secretary of State, Clinton ended up favoring the free-trade pact.

In May 2008, Time's Karen Tumulty wrote that Penn thought the Democratic primaries were "winner-take-all", rather than allotted proportionally, citing anonymous sources who attended a Clinton strategy session with Penn in 2007. Senior Clinton staffer Harold Ickes is reported to have asked in frustration, "How can it possibly be that the much vaunted chief strategist doesn't understand proportional allocation?" Penn and Howard Wolfson, Clinton's communication director, both denied that the scene had taken place.

Clinton's campaign was hobbled by infighting among the staff, including much hostility towards Penn, and disagreement in strategy such as between Penn's strategy of going negative against Obama and other staff who wanted to maintain a positive campaign.

=== Colombia free-trade agreement and resignation ===
In April 2008, Penn stepped down from his role as chief strategist for Hillary Clinton's 2008 presidential campaign following reports that he had met with representatives of the Colombian government in his capacity as CEO of Burson-Marsteller. The meeting was held to promote congressional passage of the United States–Colombia Free Trade Agreement, a bilateral trade pact that Clinton publicly opposed, leading to criticism regarding a conflict of interest ahead of the Pennsylvania primary.

Penn issued an apology, describing the meeting as "an error in judgment," while remaining with the campaign as an outside pollster and adviser through his firm Penn, Schoen & Berland. The episode drew broader commentary from political analysts regarding the influence of corporate public-relations firms in modern electoral politics; writing in America, journalist Michael Sean Winters characterized Penn's dual corporate and political consulting roles as emblematic of the institutional power and competing client interests within the professional political consulting class.

== Tony Blair campaign for prime minister (2005) ==
Penn advised British prime minister Tony Blair and conducted polling during his successful campaign for an unprecedented (for a Labour Party leader) third term in 2005. Bill Clinton had recommended Penn's services to Blair when they met at Ronald Reagan's funeral in 2004. Penn formulated the concept behind Blair's campaign slogan, "Forward Not Back", and refined it by conducting phone interviews with British swing voters through Penn, Schoen & Berland Associates. Blair's Labour Party bested Michael Howard's Conservative Party by 3% in the general parliamentary elections.

== Microtrends ==
Penn's 2009 book, Microtrends, written with Kinney Zalesne and published by Hachette, argues that small groups of people can trigger big changes. Penn argues that a mere one percent of the American public (3 million people) can create a "microtrend" capable of launching a major business or even a new cultural movement, changing commercial, political and social landscapes. From December 2008 to December 2009, Penn and Zalesne authored a regular online column for the Wall Street Journal called "Microtrends".

New York Times reviewer Harry Hurt III described Microtrends as "a diligently researched tome chock-full of counterintuitive facts and findings" and "the perfect bible for a game of not-so-trivial pursuits concerning the hidden sociological truths of modern times...".

=== Reception ===
Microtrends received significant critical attention from political commentators and journalists, with much of the reception focusing on its methodology and its reflection of Penn's strategic approach as chief strategist for Hillary Clinton's 2008 presidential campaign.

Writing in In These Times, political analyst Ezra Klein published a scathing assessment titled "Trending Toward Inanity," describing the book as "so epically awful as to take the entire polling industry down with it." Klein criticized Penn's empirical rigor, arguing that his 75 case studies committed basic "correlation/causation" fallacies and arbitrarily shifted parameters, noting that Penn "doesn't stick to" his own definition of a 1% threshold: "Sometimes, it's one-tenth of one percent... or 10 percent... or sometimes it's the microtrend of – I kid you not – the tens of millions of Americans who moved to the suburbs in the 20th century." Klein concluded that the text illustrated a broader flaw in political consulting, where pollsters "elevate their opinions into something altogether weightier: Conclusions."

In The Wall Street Journal, Sam Schulman argued that Penn's narrow focus on fragmented subsets led him to "miss the forest for the trees," pointing out that many of the supposed microtrends—such as older citizens remaining in the workforce longer—were actually the direct products of macro-level technological, health, and economic developments rather than isolated phenomena. Similarly, in The Independent, Ed Caesar observed that much of the book consisted of wrapping "a slight statistical blip around a gimmicky buzzword." Caesar cautioned against the political philosophy underpinning the book's marketing framework, characterizing Penn's method of slicing electorates into micro-targeted groups as "inspiring news for political entrepreneurs in search of a new campaign, but depressing for anyone who hopes to be argued with as a citizen rather than flattered as an off-the-peg demographic buzzword."

In a retrospective analysis following the 2008 Democratic primary, The Independent noted that critics and rival political strategists came to view the campaign's reliance on the *Microtrends* model as a central flaw against Barack Obama's broad message of "Change," arguing that Penn's preference for "niching" gave the candidate tools to target sub-groups but failed to provide an overarching national narrative.

== Rightward shift ==
According to Politico in 2018, Penn had become disenchanted with the leftward shift in the Democratic Party. Philippe Reines suggested that Penn shouldered too much of the blame for Hillary Clinton's 2008 presidential defeat. Bill Clinton said that "[Penn] wasn't invited back into the [2016] campaign."

=== Relationship with Donald Trump ===
Throughout 2018 and 2019, Penn was vocal with his criticisms of Special Counsel Robert Mueller's probe into Russian interference in the 2016 election, regularly appearing on Fox News and contributing columns to The Hill in which he, in the words of Politico, "bashed" the probe and ensuing attempt to impeach then-President Donald Trump. During this period, CNN and MSNBC declined to book Penn and his frequent appearances on Fox were criticized by some interviewed by Politico who said he was seeking revenge against Democrats for saddling him with Hillary Clinton's defeat in the 2008 U.S. presidential election.

In an August 4, 2018, appearance on Fox News, Penn called Mueller's investigation into Russian collusion "a national waste of time". Penn published several columns which criticized Mueller and political and legal adversaries of Trump. In online opinion columns, he alleged that Mueller and "Democratic-leaning lawyers" were acting improperly in trying to prepare a charge of obstruction of justice against Trump. The Daily Beast wrote that Penn had become one of Trump's biggest defenders in 2018.

Penn has used the term "deep state" to refer to what he characterizes as Democratic operatives within the government who seek to undermine and sabotage Trump's first presidency. He has alleged that Rod Rosenstein, who served as deputy attorney general in the Trump administration from 2017 to 2019, had conflicts of interest that should have precluded his involvement in investigations into Trump.

Penn met with Trump in February and November 2019 to discuss the impeachment proceedings against the president.

=== 2024 election commentary ===
In an April 2023 op-ed, Penn outlined a path to victory for a presidential candidate to win through appeals to an educated, suburban base and expressed hope for Governor of Florida Ron DeSantis, citing, among other things, a motivation to prevent Trump from becoming president again.

=== Vaccine polling ===
As of September 2025, the Department of Health and Human Services was preparing to issue a no-bid contract to the polling firm HarrisX, which is part of Stagwell, a marketing company led by Penn. The poll will seek to "understand Americans' perspectives around vaccines and drivers of trust in making vaccine decisions".

== Public opinion on Israel ==
As co-director of the Harvard CAPS / Harris Poll, Penn frequently analyzed shifts in American public sentiment regarding the conflict, highlighting broad support among older voters while expressing concern over declining support and generational division among younger demographics. Through Stagwell and its affiliated agencies, Penn has also overseen messaging and market-research initiatives in coordination with Israeli public diplomacy bodies.

In September 2025, internal strategy documents from Penn's polling and marketing firm, Stagwell Global, were leaked to Drop Site News. The documents revealed that the Israeli Ministry of Foreign Affairs had commissioned Stagwell to rehabilitate Israel's global image amid the ongoing conflict in Gaza. The leaked reports indicated that the firm conducted extensive focus groups and tested campaign messages designed to shift international narratives by associating the conflict with Islamic extremism and terrorism. In The Guardian, columnist Arwa Mahdawi condemned the firm's work, writing that marketing companies were helping to "rebrand the genocide in Gaza."

According to public filings under the Foreign Agents Registration Act (FARA) reported by Responsible Statecraft, Targeted Communications Global—a public affairs firm and affiliate of Stagwell subsidiary Targeted Victory—was retained on a $9.9 million contract by the Israeli government (subcontracted via Havas) to manage digital media campaigns and public outreach across the United States. Commenting on shifts in U.S. opinion, Penn, as Stagwell CEO, attributed declining support for Israel among younger Americans to widespread misinformation and a lack of familiarity with Israeli civil rights and governance.

== Personal life ==
Penn is married to Nancy Jacobson, the co-founder, board president and CEO of No Labels, a 501(c)4 political organization that advocates for centrism and bipartisanship.

In January 2026, Penn and Jacobson co-chaired the Jerusalem Post Miami Summit, a gathering of business leaders, diplomats, and policymakers focused on strengthening support for Israel's actions, addressing post-war regional strategy, and countering the global rise of antisemitism.

== See also ==
- Political consulting
- Triangulation (politics)
