= PSB Insights =

Company

PSB
- Type: Public relations
- Founded: 1977
- Founder: Mark Penn and Douglas Schoen
- Area served: Worldwide
- Key people: Christopher Frank, CEO
- Services: Market research, strategic communications, advertising
- Parent: WPP plc
- Website: www.psbinsights.com

PSB Insights (formerly Penn, Schoen & Berland) is a consultancy firm founded in 1977 by Mark Penn and Douglas Schoen.

== History ==
Company founders Mark Penn and Douglas Schoen met at the Horace Mann prep school, where they were both students, and they later attended Harvard University together. In 1974, Schoen brought Penn into Hugh Carey's campaign for New York governor, and in 1977, they established the firm. In 1977, Penn and Schoen were hired by consultant David Garth to carry out polling for Ed Koch's campaign for mayor of New York City. The company introduced overnight tracking polls and computer analysis of results, which informed the campaign's media strategy and helped Koch win the election. In the 1980s, they worked for Israeli prime minister Menachem Begin. According to The New York Times, the firm's use of computerized polling analysis and specialized personnel for direct-mail were key innovations in political campaigns of the period.

Michael Berland joined the company in 1990 and it became known as Penn, Schoen & Berland Associates. During the 1990s, the company increasingly focused on corporate clients, but in 1995, Schoen and Penn began working with Bill Clinton, using their experience from the corporate world and previous political clients to advise on his day-to-day communications and his 1996 reelection campaign.

In November 2001, Penn Schoen Berland was acquired by the London-based media and communications company WPP Group plc. Later that year, the company founded its media and entertainment practice. The company then became a division of Burson-Marsteller and part of the Young & Rubicam group of companies.

In July 2012, Mark Penn left both Burson-Marsteller and Penn Schoen Berland Company chairman Donald A. Baer led Penn Schoen Berland following Penn's departure. In October 2012, Burson-Marsteller executive vice president Jay Leveton was named PSB's interim CEO. In December 2019, Peter Horst was named PSB's CEO. In May 2020, PSB rebranded as PSB Insights. The firm has offices in New York City, Washington, Denver, Seattle, Los Angeles, London, and Dubai. Worldwide, PSB has more than 200 consultants.

== Campaigns and elections ==
=== Bill Clinton ===
PSB was hired by the Clinton administration in 1995 to change the White House political strategy leading up to the 1996 election, the company helped Bill Clinton to develop his "new Democrat" language and policies. For example, the term "bridge to the 21st century" was developed with help from Penn, who advised Clinton to begin using such market-tested phrases.

In 1996, the company worked on Clinton's successful re-election campaign, helping him to win on an updated platform. For the firm's work on the 1996 election, Time magazine dubbed Penn and Schoen "Masters of the Message" in an article focused on the campaign and their influence.

PSB continued to provide polling and advice during Clinton's second term. One notable PSB poll led directly to the policy of placing Social Security first in priorities for spending the budget surplus of 1997. In Clinton's 1998 State of the Union address, he called for Congress to focus first on Social Security in allocating the surplus funds.

=== Michael Bloomberg ===
In 2001 and 2005, PSB provided polling for Michael Bloomberg's New York mayoral campaigns. In the 2001 campaign, the firm carried out polling to gather information about New Yorkers' opinions. PSB was hired again by Bloomberg for his re-election campaign in 2005. The firm provided "voter-list development" and created "the most sophisticated database ever developed for a municipal election", according to the New York Post.

=== Tony Blair ===
Penn was hired by then-Prime Minister Tony Blair in 2005 to provide advice for the upcoming UK general election. He became part of the Labour Party's election team, working on a strategy to gain voters who would traditionally have voted for the Conservative Party. The strategy helped Labour, with Blair in leadership, to win a third term for the first time in the party's history.

=== Hillary Clinton ===
PSB first worked with Hillary Clinton on her successful campaign in 2000 to become New York's junior senator.

In 2007 and 2008, PSB provided Clinton with polling, direct mail, and other services for the Democratic presidential nomination. As part of services provided by the firm, Penn became Clinton's communications adviser, employing a team of 20 employees to carry out the routine campaign work. In April 2008, it was disclosed that, in his role as chief executive of Burson-Marsteller, Penn had met Colombian government representatives to discuss promoting a free-trade agreement opposed by Clinton. Penn stepped down from his role as a chief strategist but he and PSB continued to poll and provide advice for the campaign.

=== Venezuela ===
PSB organized polling during the Venezuelan recall referendum of 2004 of President Hugo Chávez and released poll results on election day, predicting that 59 percent of voters were in favor of recalling Chávez. The following day, the referendum results were almost the exact opposite of the poll results: the results showed that 58 percent opposed recalling the president. Schoen stated that he believed the referendum "was a massive fraud" and Penn noted that PSB's two previous exit polls in Venezuela had correctly predicted the final results. The results of the referendum were endorsed by César Gaviria, secretary general of the Organization of American States, and former U.S. president Jimmy Carter, who monitored the vote. Leaders of the opposition refused to accept the results, citing PSB's exit poll as proof of fraud.

The 20,000 responses in the exit poll produced a large amount of data, leading to an extremely low sampling error. According to the Center for Economic and Policy Research, because the chance of sample error in the exit poll was so low and observers did not find any signs of fraud, it may have been the survey's methodology that led to the discrepancy in results. PSB was criticized in the press for how the poll was carried out because the company used members of a Venezuelan group called Súmate for fieldwork. The group had been involved in organizing the recall and was considered anti-Chávez by the Venezuelan government. The company stated that the issues were with the voting, not the exit poll. Following the exit poll, Penn replaced Schoen as PSB's representative for Venezuela.

=== Other campaigns and elections ===
In 1999, the firm carried out polls in Serbia, commissioned by the National Democratic Institute of Washington in support of Slobodan Milošević's Democratic opponents. The polls found that the majority of voters disapproved of Milosevic's performance and wanted him to resign, supporting the view held in the U.S. that he was unlikely to win re-election.

In 2004, PSB organized an exit poll in Ukraine for the presidential election. The poll was commissioned by the Ukrainian ICTV television channel. The firm also conducted polling in Italy in 2006, on behalf of Silvio Berlusconi's Forza Italia party. Berlusconi stated that in final polls before the election he was tied with opposition leader Romano Prodi, although polls carried out by other firms had shown that Prodi would win by approximately 5 percent. In the final results, Prodi won by less than 0.1 percent of the vote.

PSB's South Asia office, led by former CEO of Genesis Burson-Marsteller (GBM) and Asia Pacific Board Member of Burson-Marsteller (B-M) Ashwani Singla, was appointed as the pollster for the 2014 Lok Sabha elections by the Bharatiya Janta Party (BJP). The firm carried out three waves of polling, including over three hundred thousand interviews, to generate a campaign strategy to win the mandate of the people of India to form the government. BJP scored an unprecedented victory, securing a single party majority not seen for the last three decades in election history.

== Corporate work ==
PSB's corporate work has focused on leveraging the experience gained in political campaigns to guide its research, advice, and communications for numerous Fortune 500 companies. The company's major corporate clients have included AT&T, Ford, McDonald’s, Citibank, Facebook, and Microsoft.

=== Notable corporate work ===
In 1993, PSB advised AT&T and analyzed its advertising strategy to help refocus the phone company and to compete with MCI Inc. The research by PSB, including polling data on lifestyle and behavior, found that AT&T's strategies had previously not included niche groups such as immigrants making calls to their home country. Following PSB's advice, AT&T used niche-market details in commercials and specially targeted offers to gain these customers.

Microsoft has been a client of PSB since the 1990s. Penn advised Bill Gates on the campaign to prevent Microsoft from being broken up, which was mandated by the 2000 court decision in the anti-trust case brought by the U.S. Justice Department. The company also provided key research into consumer opinions about Microsoft following the court case.

In 2004, PSB carried out research for McDonald's in the UK when the fast food company was concerned about negative public opinion following the release of the film Super Size Me. PSB's surveys of consumers and stakeholder groups found that food quality was a high priority among these audiences. The results led to the initiation of an advertising campaign focusing on food quality.

From the early 1990s, PSB has conducted surveys of fans for Major League Baseball. According to MLB commissioner Bud Selig, the research led to changes in the structure of the sport including expansion of playoffs and interleague play. In 1997, while MLB was deciding whether to pursue geographic realignment of teams, PSB carried out research including surveys and focus groups of fans. The company found that a majority of fans were in favor of such realignment.

The company conducted research for Ford in 2009 and 2010, focusing on its in-car electronics. A 2009 PSB poll to support Ford's sales case for built-in electronics found that 93 percent of those surveyed agree with the idea of a nationwide ban on texting while driving. In 2010, Ford introduced technology to allow parents to prevent teenage drivers from listening to explicit radio content based on PSB survey data.

In 2015, Ford was preparing to introduce a redesigned F-150 truck, featuring an aluminum body. PSB conducted research to determine the most effective messages to promote the new F-150 while neutralizing any potential attacks on its durability and safety. By describing the materials as “military-grade aluminum alloys” and emphasizing that the same materials are used by the US Military in their advanced attack vehicles, Ford was able to position their #1 selling vehicle as the toughest truck on the market.

== Entertainment and media ==
The company's entertainment and media practice was founded in 2001 and provides research for magazine publishers, film studios, and video game publishers, including marketing positioning, test screenings, focus groups, creative advertising testing, and box office tracking. In 2012, PSB expanded this area of its business with the acquisition of First Movies International, an entertainment market research company. Major entertainment and media clients of PSB include Disney, Paramount Pictures, and Condé Nast, for whom the company carried out research to decide on a name for its former business magazine, Condé Nast Portfolio.

== Public research ==
=== Aspen Institute studies ===
PSB has also conducted studies for the Aspen Institute and the related Aspen Ideas Festival. Partnering with Time magazine and the Aspen Institute in 2011, PSB polled Americans on their opinions of the decade following the September 11th terrorist attacks. The following year, the company conducted polls on Americans' attitudes towards the Patient Protection and Affordable Care Act which was commissioned by The Atlantic and the Aspen Institute.

=== Global Corporate Reputation Index ===
In 2012, the company released its "Global Corporate Reputation Index" at the World Economic Forum in Davos, Switzerland. The index listed the top 25 consumer companies by reputation. The research for the index was conducted in partnership with Burson-Marsteller, Landor Associates, and Brand Asset Consulting, and consisted of 40,000 interviews in 6 countries, focusing on the qualities associated with nearly 6,000 companies.

=== Arab Youth Survey ===
For 11 years, ASDA’A, BCW, and PSB have presented evidence-based insights into the attitudes of Arab youth via its Arab Youth Survey, providing public and private sector organizations with data and analysis to make effective decisions and policies. It is the largest survey of its kind, conducted in 15 Arab states and territories with 3,300 face-to-face interviews with young Arabs ages 18–24.

== Selected awards ==
Mark Penn was named Pollster of the year in 1996 and 2000 by the American Association of Political Consultants, for the company's political polling. PSB received a Telly Award in 2008 for its work on Dominion's "Every Day" Campaign, a Pollie Award in 2009 for Television Advertising for its "3AM" commercial for Hillary Clinton's presidential campaign, and a Reed Award in 2011 for Best Radio Ad from Campaigns and Elections magazine for work done for the National Association of Convenience Stores. In 2012 PSB was awarded a David Ogilvy Award from the Advertising Research Foundation for its work on "Justin Bieber: Never Say Never".
