= StrategyOne =

Consultancy firm

Edelman Data & Intelligence
- Company type: Private
- Industry: Market Research Consulting
- Founded: 1999
- Headquarters: New York, New York
- Key people: Antoine Harary, Global president
- Website: https://www.edelmandxi.com/

Edelman Data & Intelligence (formerly StrategyOne, Inc.) is a research and analytics consultancy. The company was founded as StrategyOne, Inc. in 1999 and renamed Edelman Data & Intelligence (DXI) in 2020.

The firm, led by Antoine Harary, is a subsidiary of the public relations firm Edelman. It oversees the agency’s approach to reputation, branding and communications research.

Edelman Data & Intelligence was ranked among the top 50 U.S. market research and analytics companies in the American Marketing Association’s (AMA) 2018 Gold Report.

== History ==
In 1999, Edelman launched StrategyOne, a market research firm that would live under its Daniel J. Edelman Inc. holding company. A year later, it launched the first installment of the Edelman Trust Barometer.

In 2011, StrategyOne acquired the research firm PluggedIN, which specializes in using online communities for building research groups.

In 2012, StrategyOne absorbed into a newly-launched research venture, Edelman Berland. The new venture took its name from Michael Berland, who was appointed as its CEO.

Following Michael Berland's departure in 2016, the firm renamed itself Edelman Intelligence, under Antoine Harary's leadership. Then in 2020, the firm announced it was changing its name to Edelman Data & Intelligence.

In 2025 the company launched GEOsight, a generative engine optimization to assist with AI-generated search results.

== Notable research ==
The company's research has been highlighted in a number of major news outlets including the Wall Street Journal, the New York Times, the Washington Post, and USA Today.

== Trust Barometer ==
Edelman Data & Intelligence is the research company behind the Edelman Trust Barometer, an international study conducted in 25 countries that examines trust in business, government, media, and NGOs. The study has been running every year since 2000.
