= No Labels =

American political organization

- Formation: December 13, 2010; 15 years ago (public launch)
- Type: Advocacy organization
- Tax ID no.: 27-1432208
- Legal status: 501(c)(4)
- Headquarters: Washington, D.C.
- Region served: United States
- CEO: Nancy Jacobson
- Board of directors: Nancy Jacobson (president); Jerald S Howe Jr. (treasurer); Andrew Tisch; Andrew M. Bursky; Dennis C. Blair; Dan K. Webb; Charles R. Black Jr.; Holly Page; Kathleen Shanahan; Tish Bazil
- Website: www.nolabels.org

No Labels is an American political organization whose stated mission is to support bipartisanship and unity through what it calls the "commonsense majority". No Labels was founded in 2010 as a 501(c)(4) by current president and CEO Nancy Jacobson. Senator Joe Lieberman served as its national co-chair from 2014 to 2024.

Historically, No Labels has focused on the workings of Congress in bringing House and Senate leaders together to find moderate solutions. On April 4, 2024, the organization ended its effort to secure ballot access for a Unity ticket for the 2024 United States presidential election. Following Lieberman's death on March 27, 2024, the organization stated that it would remain true to its commitment to not offer its ballot line to a candidate who did not have a likely path to victory to avoid them acting as a "spoiler" for either party.

== History ==
=== Founding ===
No Labels was founded on December 13, 2010, with the slogan "Not Left. Not Right. Forward". Organizers said the aim was to organize American voters against partisanship in politics and encourage a "common ground" approach to problem solving. The group's early efforts were viewed by some skeptics as an attempt to support a potential third party presidential campaign for Michael Bloomberg in 2012, which he and No Labels denied. No Labels had relatively few Republicans at its first conference in 2010, and criticism of the movement at the time came largely from the right.

=== Campaigns ===
==== Bipartisan seating ====
In January 2012, No Labels proposed that Congress have bipartisan seating at the State of Union. By the time of address, 190 members agreed to sit with a member of the opposite party.

==== Fast-track presidential appointments ====
In his 2012 State of the Union address, Barack Obama endorsed No Labels' proposal of a rule requiring a simple yes or no vote within 90 days of all presidential judicial and public service nominations.

==== No budget, No pay ====
In 2013, Obama signed H.R. 325 "No Budget, No Pay Act of 2013" into law mandating the pay for lawmakers be held in escrow until their chamber has passed a budget resolution. This was a modified version of No Labels' proposal which had called for member pay to be lost permanently during any period in which they had failed to meet the budget deadline.

=== Policy Publications ===
Over the past decade, No Labels has published policy documents and reform proposals detailing its legislative priorities.

The group's earliest framework, Make Congress Work!, proposed congressional rule changes intended to increase bipartisan collaboration.

Ahead of the 2020 election, the organization released The Ultimate Guide to the 2020 Election, detailing 101 policy proposals it described as nonpartisan.

In 2023, No Labels released its Common Sense policy booklet, which outlined a platform for a potential third-party presidential ticket aimed at attracting centrist voters who are tired of the extreme left and right.

More recently, No Labels published Nightmare on Main Street, a booklet featured in Fortune, which envisions a hypothetical 2028 debt crisis to advocate for immediate deficit reduction.

=== Congress ===
In January 2013, No Labels promoted an informal "Problem Solvers" caucus in Congress for members of the House of Representatives and the Senate. The group initially began as 24 Democratic and Republican members of Congress who pledged to meet regularly. Members would identify their affiliation by wearing lapel pins, particularly during events such as the 2013 and 2015 State of the Union addresses.

In 2017, the group helped to formally start the Problem Solvers Caucus in the House of Representatives, a bipartisan group of approximately 60 congressional members.

Before the 2019–2020 House term, No Labels released a plan called The Speaker Project, which called on members of Congress to withhold their votes for the next House speaker until the nominee agreed to rule changes that would enhance bipartisan cooperation. Several planks from this proposal were later included in an agreement that the Problem Solvers Caucus reached with Speaker Nancy Pelosi. Some praised the agreement as practical and necessary, while others claimed it might give House Republicans and/or corporate interests more power for that term.

In 2021, Maryland Gov. Larry Hogan (R) convened governors, senators and House members of the bipartisan Problem Solvers Caucus for a summit on finding bipartisan consensus in President Biden’s proposed infrastructure plan. Following the summit, the group agreed that any infrastructure plan should focus first on “conventional infrastructure” before addressing a more expansive plan. The resulting "Building Bridges" blueprint for a bipartisan infrastructure deal was the first deal to be endorsed by Republicans and Democrats during that Congress, and several of its ideas were incorporated into the bipartisan Infrastructure and Jobs Act passed into law in November 2021.

=== 2024 presidential ticket ===
No Labels ballot access before the abandonment of the campaign Certified for ballot (18 states, 147 electors) Petition awaiting certification (8 states, 44 electors) Petition rejected (1 state, 17 electors) Automatic write-in (5 states, 46 electors) Not on ballot

No Labels intended to offer its ballot line to a "unity ticket" in the 2024 presidential election, as an "insurance policy" in the event that "both major parties nominate presidential candidates that the vast majority of Americans don’t want". In 2021, No Labels began funding a Presidential operation. In November 2023, No Labels' chief strategist, Ryan Clancy, stated that "Based on the conditions as they are, we expect to be putting up a ticket early next year". By February 2024, The New York Times described the efforts as having "foundered for months now" with the group's most high-profile potential candidates ruling out running on a No Labels ticket.

Senator Joe Manchin was among the most high-profile candidates sought by No Labels; in mid-February, however, he ruled out a 2024 presidential run, citing timing and to avoid being a spoiler. Congressman Dean Phillips said he would consider running on the No Labels ticket if polling suggested that President Joe Biden would end up losing to Donald Trump, but reversed his statement a day later. Former Republican governors Larry Hogan, Jon Huntsman, and Nikki Haley all denied interest in a presidential run on the No Labels ticket. Manchin later said in September 2025 that he ruled out a run because No Labels wanted a Republican on their presidential ticket.

No Labels and its supporters cited polling showing voters' disapproval of the presumptive 2024 Democratic and Republican presidential nominees. In August 2022, No Labels released a poll of voters in eight battleground states, finding 63% of voters open to a "moderate independent" presidential candidate; however, Intelligencer columnist Ed Kilgore argues that once a specific candidate is chosen, polling numbers will drop dramatically. A poll from Monmouth University on July 20, 2023, concluded that, if No Labels' chosen candidates were more popular with conservatives, it was not clear which major party would benefit more: "The presence of a third party in the race would siphon votes from both major party nominees, but it is not apparent it would play the role of a spoiler." FiveThirtyEight's review of polling on July 13, 2023, predicted at that time that a bi-partisan ticket would likely benefit Trump.

The effort was criticized by some Democrats, centrists, and Republicans; some people feared it could give former president Trump a second term. One report claimed that certain center-left members of No Labels' Problem Solvers Caucus were "in open revolt"; co-founder William Galston resigned in protest. A bipartisan group of former lawmakers launched a super PAC called Citizens to Save Our Republic to focus on stopping No Labels' presidential ticket. Nonprofits Third Way and MoveOn also organized a campaign to get Democrats to disavow No Labels. Former New Jersey governor Chris Christie has been critical of the organization, stating that No Labels does not "know who they’re going to hurt". Despite his expressed misgivings, in March 2024, Christie briefly considered making a No Labels run before ruling out the idea later that same month. Former House Speaker Nancy Pelosi called the effort "perilous to our democracy" citing how a moderately successful 2024 presidential run would throw the election to state congressional delegations which Republicans control. President Biden has stated that a No Labels candidacy would help his opponent. Biden's top aides have blessed efforts of allies to push financial and political support away from No Labels and other potential third party bids. Democrats have worked to spread negative information about potential third party candidates while lawyers have researched options to limit ballot access. Clancy stated in November 2023 that "we don’t think Trump should ever again be president", and promised that No Labels would not act as a spoiler that would benefit Trump.

Mike Rawlings confirmed in March 2024 that the organization still intended to field a presidential candidate. Chairman Joe Lieberman announced the candidate selection process, discussing the creation of the "Country Over Party Committee", a group of 12 individuals which would vet and select a presidential and vice presidential candidate. At that point, the decision would be voted on by delegates of the organization. By then, No Labels had ballot access in 16 states: Alaska, Arizona, Arkansas, Colorado, Florida, Hawaii, Kansas, Maine, Maryland, Mississippi, Montana, Nevada, North Carolina, Oregon, South Dakota, and Utah. No Labels additionally achieved ballot access in Delaware, Nebraska, North Dakota, Wisconsin, Rhode Island, Tennessee, Wyoming, Alabama, and Louisiana, bringing the total number of states with No Labels ballot access to 25 states.

On April 4, 2024, the organization ended its effort to run a presidential ticket for the 2024 election. The New York Times said that Lieberman's death on March 27 meant the organization had "little political firepower to recruit potential candidates". Joe Cunningham, the national director for No Labels, said the group was "looking for a hero and a hero never emerged." In an interview with the Chicago Sun-Times later that month, No Labels lawyer Dan K. Webb stated that Christie had agreed in March to be a presidential candidate for the organization, but a Democratic vice-presidential nominee could not be found.

==== Legal disputes ====
===== Intimidation complaint =====
In January 2024, No Labels filed a complaint with the U.S. Department of Justice alleging an "illegal conspiracy to use intimidation, harassment and fear against representatives of No Labels, its donors and as potential candidates." The complaint claimed members of Third Way and The Lincoln Project actively threatened No Labels and prospective candidates to cease their presidential ambitions.

===== Arizona =====
After No Labels secured ballot recognition in Arizona in 2023 and grew to nearly 40,000 registered voters, a July 2025 Ninth Circuit ruling stripped the party of its ability to block unapproved candidates from running in its primary. Following that decision, a local group of Arizonans led by former Phoenix Mayor Paul Johnson established a ballot line to run independent candidates up and down the ballot. The national No Labels organization subsequently severed ties with the state affiliate, leaving the local group to assume full operations and rebrand as the Arizona Independent Party.

===== Durst lawsuit =====
In January 2024, real estate heirs Douglas Durst and his cousin, Jonathan, sued No Labels alleging a "bait and switch" scheme had been used to finance their third-party presidential campaign. The Durst family says it has donated to No Labels since 2016, when the group's messaging focused on bipartisan policy legislation, but contend that No Labels' presidential ambitions are a breach of their donor's trust. According to No Labels, the Dursts have not donated in several years.

===== Maine =====
In May 2023, the Secretary of State of Maine, Democrat Shenna Bellows, sent No Labels a cease and desist letter after accusing the organization of misleading voters into registering for the party. She claimed that No Labels misrepresented voter registrations as petitions, and informed each registrant how to change their party affiliation. No Labels argued that Bellows' actions could amount to voter suppression and responded by stating that their organizers were instructed to ask voters to join their party, and noted that the form signed by voters is titled "Maine Voter Registration Application". While 798 people who received letters from Bellows unenrolled from No Labels, the group still had enough registered voters to qualify for the Maine ballot. In January 2024, the party was confirmed as a qualified political party giving them ballot access. No Labels rejected a state-run primary in Maine.

== Funding ==
No Labels does not disclose its donors' identities, citing the potential for lobbying and pressure campaigns for major donors to stop backing the organization. IRS section 501(c) organizations are not legally required to disclose their donors. This lack of transparency has been a major source of criticism for the organization alongside critiques that the group prioritizes the wellbeing of wealthy donors instead of policies with broad appeal that could reduce partisanship. The Intercept and Jacobin report examples of the group working to block tax increases on the wealthiest Americans and corporations. A 2023 Wall Street Journal article described the known donors as being from industries like energy and finance that largely lean Republican.

Early donors to No Labels include board member Andrew Tisch, co-chairman of Loews Corporation; Ron Shaich, founder of Panera Bread; Dave Morin, a former Facebook executive, and supporters of Michael Bloomberg. A 2018 Chicago Sun-Times investigation found five super PACs that were affiliated with No Labels, sparking an OpenSecrets investigation identifying two more. All seven super PACs were closed in 2020. The Daily Beast reported that in 2018 No Labels' super PACs received more than $11 million from 53 donors, most of whom worked in finance. The New Republic reported in 2023 that No Labels received major funding from Harlan Crow, a leading donor to Republican and conservative causes. No Labels has sometimes been described as a dark money organization.

== Leadership ==
Nancy Jacobson has been the board president since the founding of the organization and as of 2022, CEO. In December 2020, No Labels announced Maryland governor Larry Hogan as a national co-chair (prominent spokesperson) to serve alongside the No Labels founding co-chair Joe Lieberman. In January 2023, former NAACP executive director Benjamin Chavis joined Hogan as national co-chair. In June 2023, former North Carolina governor Pat McCrory joined as a national co-chair. Hogan stepped down as co-chair in December 2023.

Nancy Jacobson and Jerald S. Howe Jr. (board treasurer) have been on the board since the founding of the group in 2010. Andrew Tisch joined in 2012. Andrew M. Bursky joined in 2015. Dennis C. Blair and Charles R. Black Jr. joined in 2019. Tish Bazil was added to the organization's website as a board member in 2023. Previous board members include: Ted Buerger (2010), Joshua Bekenstein (2010), Mark Nunnelly (2010), Mark McKinnon (2010–2012), Nate Garvis (2010–2013), Holly Page (2010–2013), Lisa Borders (2014–2017), Kenneth A. Gross (2012–2023) and Margie Fox (2009–2023).

In May 2025, No Labels announced three new Congressional National Leaders to continue to bring Congressmembers together to build consensus solutions. Senator Markwayne Mullin, Representatives Jared Golden and Marie Gluesenkamp Perez will help No Labels by championing a less divisive way forward.

Based on 14 interviews with former employees in December 2022, Politico described a "cutthroat culture" within No Labels. In response to the criticism, several senior officials for the group described to Politico the complaints as coming from "aggrieved ex-workers" who could not "adapt" to a demanding office culture. Politico reported that in addition to requiring non-disclosure agreements, Nancy Jacobson has been accused by former employees of asking staff members to obscure where they work on LinkedIn, allegedly, in order to make it more difficult for journalists to interview No Labels employees.

== 2024 candidates ==
While several candidates were rumored to be in consideration for No Labels Unity ticket, including Joe Manchin and Chris Christie, No Labels did not authorize any candidates to utilize its ballot for any office. Despite this, several local candidates tried to run on the No Labels ballot.

Damon Townsend ran as a No Labels Party candidate for Secretary of State of Washington State in the August 6, 2024 primary. He finished fourth with 5.02% of the vote.

Richard Grayson ran as a No Labels Party candidate for U.S. Representative from Alaska in the August 20, 2024 primary and finished tenth with 0.13% of the vote.

== See also ==
- Americans Elect
- Better for America
- Forward Party
- Mark Penn, husband of Nancy Jacobson
- Political moderate
- Reagan Democrat
- Reform Party
- Spoiler candidate
- Third party
