= Microtrends =

2007 book by Mark Penn and Kinney Zalesne

Microtrends: The Small Forces Behind Tomorrow's Big Changes
- Hardcover edition
- Author: Mark Penn, Kinney Zalesne
- Language: English
- Subject: Demography, sociology
- Genre: Non-fiction
- Publisher: Twelve
- Publication date: September 5, 2007
- Publication place: United States
- Media type: Print, e-book
- Pages: 425 pp. (1st edition)
- ISBN: 978-0446580960

Microtrends: The Small Forces Behind Tomorrow's Big Changes is a non-fiction book by Mark Penn and Kinney Zalesne. The text was initially published by Twelve on September 5, 2007. Mark Penn has been named the winner of the Consumer Insights category in the 2010 Atticus Awards for this book.

== Overview ==
The text focuses on subtle and nearly invisible trends in demography, sociology, business, family life, technologies, human interactions, and many other areas—that are currently shaping the potential future of the world and society. Overall, the authors try to categorize approximately 75 microtrends (hence the name of the book) seen in the modern world.

== WSJ column ==
The book examines how small groups of people can trigger big changes. Specifically, Penn and Zalesne show how a mere one percent of the American public, or 3 million people, can create a "microtrend" capable of launching a major business or even a new cultural movement, changing commercial, political and social landscapes. From December 2008 to December 2009, Penn and Zalesne authored a regular online column for the Wall Street Journal called "Microtrends", focusing on demographic trends in society and business. Microtrends appeared regularly in the Media & Marketing section of the Wall Street Journal.

== Reception ==
Microtrends is a diligently researched tome chock-full of counterintuitive facts and findings that may radically alter the way you see the present, the future, and your places in both. The book’s 15 main chapters group microtrends in virtually every area of life, like "Love, Sex, and Relationships," "Politics," "Technology," "Education," "Food, Drink & Diet" and "Looks and Fashion." ... Microtrends is the perfect bible for a game of not-so-trivial pursuits concerning the hidden sociological truths of modern times.

—Review by The New York Times
