= Nancy Jacobson =

American founder and CEO of political organization No Labels (born 1962)

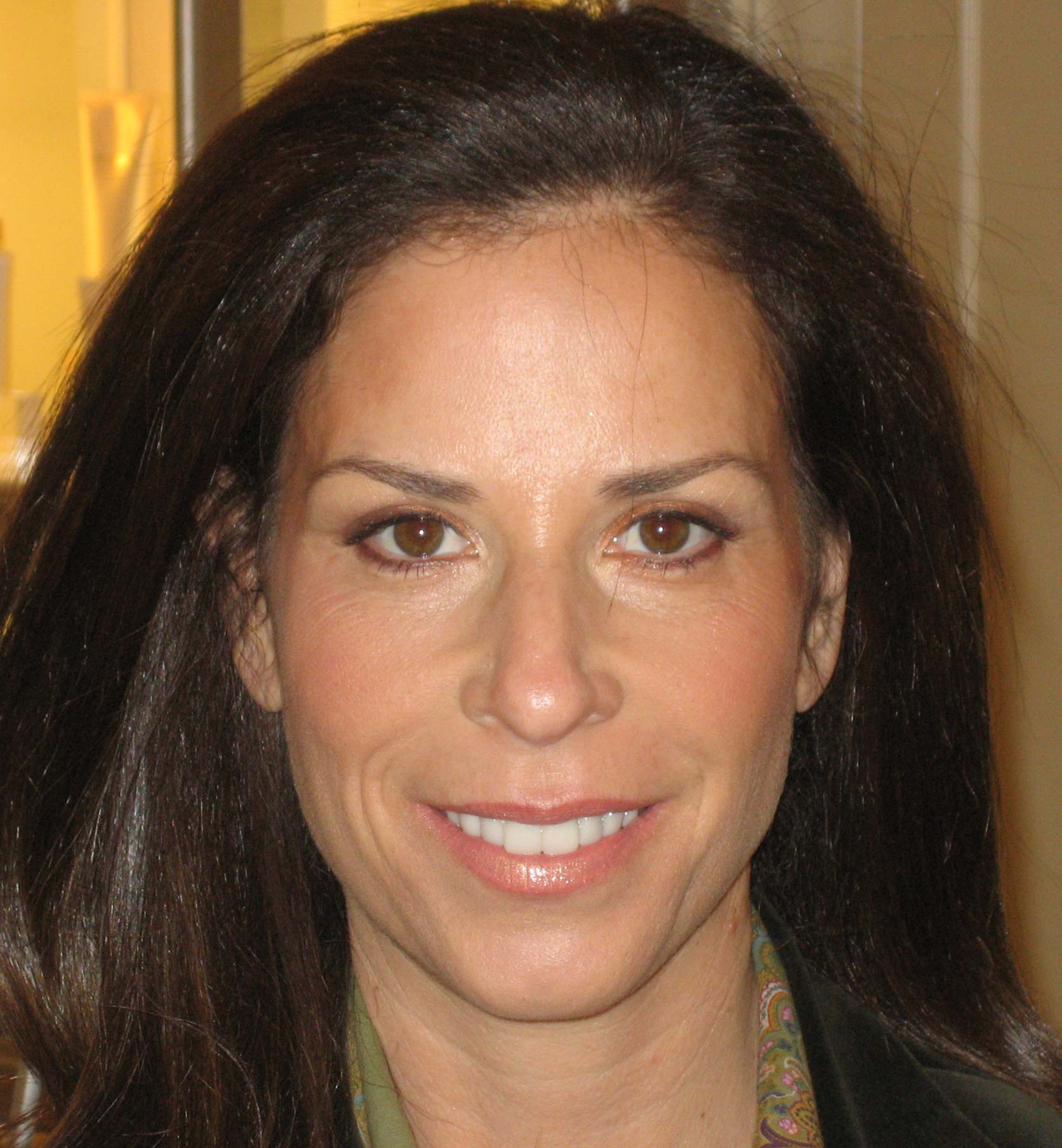
- Jacobson in 2007
- Born: November 9, 1962 (age 63); Miami, Florida, U.S.
- Education: Syracuse University (BA); American University (MA)
- Occupation: CEO of No Labels
- Political party: Independent (2010–present)
- Other political affiliations: Democratic (before 2010)
- Spouse: Mark Penn (m. 1999)
- Children: 4 (Note: 3 stepchildren)

Nancy Jacobson (born November 9, 1962) is an American political activist. A former fundraiser for the Democratic Party, she later became founder and CEO of the centrist organization No Labels.

== Career ==
=== Early career ===
Jacobson was born in Miami, Florida, on November 9, 1962. She graduated from Syracuse University. Jacobson's first political organizing occurred as a student at Syracuse University, where she organized a fundraising event to support then-Senator Gary Hart's 1984 campaign for the Democratic presidential nomination.

She supported Al Gore’s presidential campaign in 1988, and Bill Clinton's 1992 presidential campaign, and was the finance director of the 1992 Presidential Inaugural Committee. She later served as finance chair of the Democratic National Committee (DNC) and the Democratic Leadership Council (DLC).

From 1995 through 2010, she was the national finance director for Sen. Evan Bayh. She oversaw his political and fundraising strategy during his 2008 bid for the Democratic presidential nomination. In 2007, Jacobson was named one of the 50 Most Powerful People in D.C. by GQ Magazine. She has also been referred to as "one of the most powerful women in Washington."

=== No Labels ===
Jacobson founded No Labels in 2010 with the stated goal of promoting bipartisanship. The organization has put forth ideas that it says will "put problem solving above politics", and supports centrist, moderate social and economic policies.

The No Labels group was instrumental in the creation of the congressional Problem Solvers Caucus. A number of proposals supported by the group have been signed into law. In 2021, the Problem Solvers Caucus, composed of an equal number of Democrats and Republicans, released a "Building Bridges" blueprint for a bipartisan infrastructure deal. It was the first deal to be endorsed by Republicans and Democrats during that budget cycle. In connection with her work with No Labels, New York Times columnist David Brooks described her in 2016 as an "undeterrable" leader.

No Labels has also been criticized of fostering a toxic environment by former employees, according to Politico.

=== Other activities ===
Jacobson and her husband Mark Penn served as co-chairs of the Jerusalem Post Miami Summit in January 2026, an event focused on strengthening support for Israel amidst a global "rise in antisemitism". In an interview prior to the summit, Jacobson emphasized the "unbreakable bond" between the U.S. and Israel, arguing that the two have shared democratic values and that "the same forces that aim to destroy Israel want to harm the US. The Iranian regime, Syria under Assad, Hezbollah, and Hamas were all sworn enemies of the US, who had killed Americans. Since Oct. 7, Israel has decimated these forces, and that makes the world safer for Americans and free-thinking people everywhere".

== Personal life ==
Jacobson is married to Mark Penn, president and managing partner of The Stagwell Group, former Democratic pollster and executive for Microsoft and Burson-Marsteller. The couple met in 1996 when Evan Bayh, then governor of Indiana, introduced them at a Democratic Leadership Council event. They married in 1999. They have four children.
