= Michael Berland =

American businessman

Mike Berland
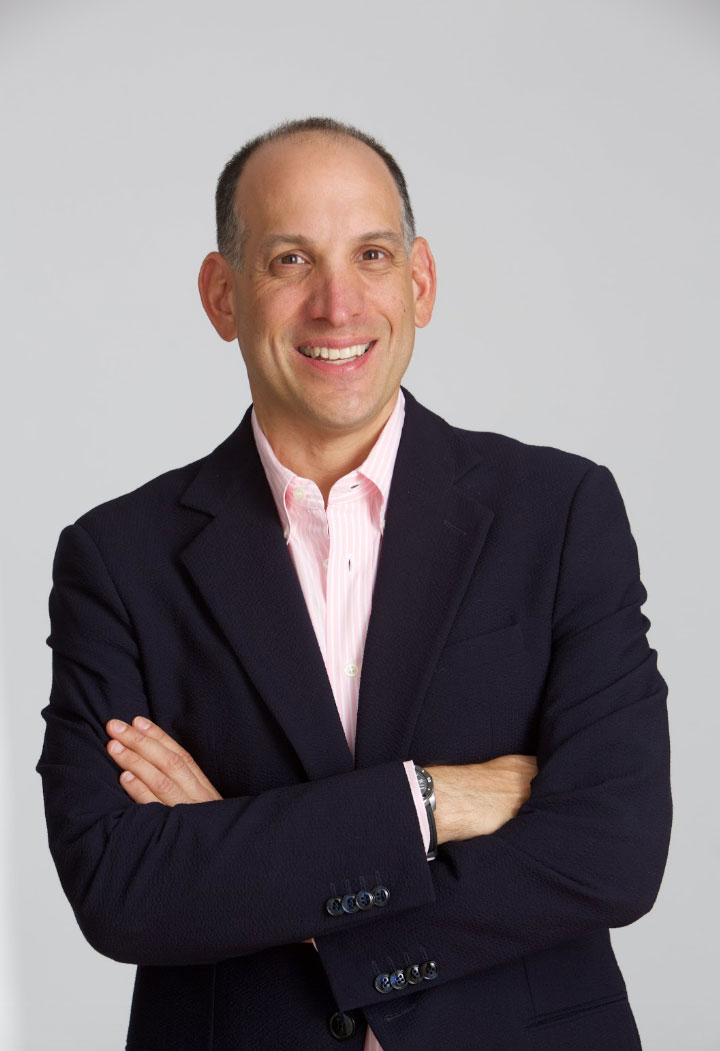
- Born: Michael J. Berland; April 6, 1968 (age 58)
- Education: University of Massachusetts Amherst
- Occupations: Founder and CEO of Decode_M
- Spouse: Marcela Berland (m. 1991; separated 2025)
- Children: 1 daughter, 1 son
- Website: michaelberland.com

Mike Berland (born April 6, 1968) is the founder of Agentik Momentum, a strategy firm focused on artificial intelligence and human decision-making. He previously founded Decode_M, an insights and strategy firm, in 2016. In 2022, Decode_M was acquired by Penta. Prior to founding Decode_M, Berland was CEO of Edelman Berland, the global intelligence, research, and analytics division of Edelman. Before joining Edelman Berland in 2012, he was president of the market research and polling firm Penn, Schoen & Berland.

He is the author of Not About Golf (Regan Arts., 2025), Maximum Momentum (Regan Arts., 2020) and the co-author of What Makes You Tick? How Successful People Do It—And What You Can Learn from Them (HarperCollins, May 2009) with his PSB partner Douglas Schoen. He is also the co-author of Fat-Burning Machine: The 12-Week Plan (Regan Arts., 2015) with former Olympic triathlon coach Gale Bernhardt.

Berland has been a strategic advisor to political leaders including Michael Bloomberg and Hillary Clinton and companies such as Facebook. For the 2008–2009 season, Berland was the head of communications for the National Hockey League (NHL). He appeared on Fox Business Network's Mornings with Maria in 2015 to discuss political strategy.

== Education ==
Berland attended The Latin School of Chicago and graduated magna cum laude from the University of Massachusetts Amherst, where he was a Commonwealth Scholar. He received his initial training at the Social and Demographic Research Institute.

== Penn Schoen Berland ==
In his former role as president of PSB, Berland led global business development, building on PSB's client and research work in Europe, Asia and Latin America. Penn, Schoen & Berland was acquired by WPP in 2001.

=== Corporate consulting ===
Berland has developed communications campaigns for brands, including RIM/Blackberry. As a partner at PSB, he helps his clients through the use of research, image analysis, message development, and corporate and product positioning and targeting.

=== Sports and entertainment work ===
In 2003, Berland was the Dixie Chicks' political crisis consultant, advising the band amid its controversial criticism of President Bush. Berland had a cameo appearance in director Barbara Kopple's documentary "Shut Up & Sing", which followed the Dixie Chicks for three years during which they were under political attack and received death threats in response to their anti-Bush comment.

Just after the 2004 election, Berland and his partner Doug Schoen published a study in the LA Times, calling Super Bowl Sunday "the 11th national holiday" and the only true "uniter, not divider." Their survey of 1,735 Americans found that Super Bowl watchers are football and non-football fans alike who plan further ahead for the event than they do for any other major holiday.

In 2009, Berland was the Director of Communications and Editorial for the NHL (National Hockey League). In his role, he was responsible for public relations and editorial content for the NHL across all media assets.

=== Political campaigns ===
Berland has worked with political candidates in the US and abroad. He was a strategic advisor to New York City Mayor Michael Bloomberg in his 2001 and 2005 mayoral campaigns and led the targeting and direct mail effort for Hillary Clinton's 2006 Senate and 2008 Presidential campaigns.

== Not About Golf ==
In 2025, Berland published Not About Golf: The Life Changing Joy of Playing the Game (Regan Arts), a book that uses golf as a lens to examine how we build relationships, manage emotions, and grow as individuals. Drawing on his own experiences as a passionate amateur, Berland challenges outdated perceptions of the sport and reframes it as a tool for connection, mindfulness, and character development. The book argues that golf is more inclusive and rewarding than many realize, with growing relevance for younger players, women, and people from all backgrounds. He emphasizes that golf teaches key life skills like generosity, honesty, and patience, making it a lifelong pursuit that supports both physical health and emotional well-being.

== Maximum Momentum ==
In 2020, Berland released Maximum Momentum: How to Get It, How to Keep It (Regan Arts., 2020), offering a data-driven blueprint for accelerating growth in business, politics, and personal performance. Drawing from Decode_M’s proprietary data analytics, the book explains how individuals and organizations can diagnose their current state of momentum and unlock breakthrough performance. Berland introduces the “Momentum Matrix,” a framework to evaluate energy, direction, and acceleration—arguing that sustained progress relies on understanding when to pivot and when to push forward.

== Fat-Burning Machine ==
In 2015, Berland co-authored Fat-Burning Machine: The 12-Week Plan (Regan Arts., 2015) with fitness coach Gale Bernhardt, offering a science-based approach to sustainable weight loss and health transformation. Inspired by his own 70-pound weight loss journey, Berland details his shift from conventional dieting to a fat-burning metabolism through practical adjustments in nutrition, exercise, and mindset. The book became a USA Today and Wall Street Journal bestseller, resonating with readers seeking long-term, low-stress methods to reclaim health.

== What Makes You Tick? ==
In 2009, Berland and his partner Douglas Schoen released What Makes You Tick? How Successful People Do It—And What You Can Learn from Them (HarperCollins), analyzing how successful people found success in their chosen field. Through interviews with 50 leaders in a variety of fields, the authors classified each of these high achievers into one of five "success archetypes": "Natural-Born Leaders," "Independence Seekers," "Visionaries", "Do-Gooders", and "Independents Who Follow Their Dreams". The authors then argue that if one can identify one's own success archetype and learn how to leverage it, one can achieve success.

== Personal life ==
Berland lives in New York City and is separated from his wife, Marcela. He has two adult children, Matthew and Isabella. He previously was on the board of trustees at the Latin School of Chicago and chaired the Gotham chapter of the Young Presidents' Organization (YPO) in NYC.
