= Douglas Schoen =

American political consultant

Doug Schoen
- Born: Douglas E. Schoen; June 27, 1953 (age 73)
- Education: Harvard University (BA, JD); University of Oxford (PhD)

Douglas E. Schoen (born June 27, 1953) is an American lawyer, political analyst, author, lobbyist, and political commentator. In 1977, he co-founded the political consulting firm Penn, Schoen & Berland, and was hired by President Bill Clinton and Ukrainian steel oligarch Victor Pinchuk. From 2009–2021 he worked for Fox News, and since 2021 for Newsmax TV.

== Early life and education ==
Schoen was raised on the Upper East Side of Manhattan, the son of a corporate lawyer. He is of Jewish descent. He graduated from the Horace Mann School in New York City. While still a high school student, he canvassed the Upper West Side for Dick Morris. In 1974, he graduated from Harvard College.

Schoen graduated from Harvard College magna cum laude and Harvard Law School. While in college, Schoen founded Penn & Schoen with Mark Penn, also a Horace Mann School alumni.

== Career ==
=== Consulting work ===
While still at Harvard, Schoen first worked as an independent political consultant for Louis R. Gigante, associate pastor of St. Athanasius Roman Catholic Church, in the South Bronx, who successfully ran for New York City Council in 1973.

In 1977, he co-founded the political consulting firm Penn, Schoen & Berland with political strategists Mark Penn. Michael Berland joined the firm in 1987. Schoen worked for the political campaigns of politicians including Jay Rockefeller, Richard Shelby and Evan Bayh. Following the 1994 United States elections, President Bill Clinton hired Dick Morris, who brought on Schoen and Penn. Schoen worked on the 1996 campaign as well in survey analysis. Schoen also began doing corporate work beginning in the 1980s.

In 2000, Ukrainian steel oligarch Victor Pinchuk hired Schoen on a $40,000 per month retainer. The firm was sold to WPP plc in 2001. Schoen left the firm later to work for news media.

In 2004, Schoen introduced Pinchuk to Hillary Clinton. He also did work for the Hillary Clinton presidential campaign, 2008 and later became associated with the People United Means Action movement of disaffected Clinton supporters who refused to support Barack Obama. Schoen was a consultant for Jeff Greene in the 2010 Florida Senate election.

In 2010, Schoen hosted a fundraiser for Republican congressional candidate John Gomez.

Pinchuk donated $13.1 million to the Clinton Foundation in the years after Schoen's introduction. In 2011, Schoen was paid $40,000 a month by Victor Pinchuk, as reported in his Foreign Agents Registration Act of 1938 statement. Schoen registered as a foreign agent lobbying on behalf of Victor Pinchuk. Between September 2011 and November 2012, Schoen arranged nearly a dozen meetings between Pinchuk and senior State Department officials, including Melanne Verveer. In September 2015, Pinchuk donated $150,000 to the Donald J. Trump Foundation in exchange for a 20-minute video appearance by Donald Trump shown at a policy conference that year in Kyiv. Michael Cohen solicited Schoen for the donation from Pinchuk, which was the largest outside donation the Trump Foundation received that year. In March 2017, former Trump aide Monica Crowley registered as a foreign agent working for Pinchuk under Schoen's direction.

=== Media ===
Fox News hired Schoen as a political analyst in 2009 and Newsmax hired Schoen as a columnist. In 2010, he authored a book on the Tea Party movement with Scott Rasmussen. He has been writing a regular column for Forbes magazine beginning in July 2016 with a column "Donald Trump Through The Years".

Newsmax TV announced that Schoen would be leaving Fox News and on January 19, 2021, Schoen joined Newsmax TV as an Analyst.

It was reported in 2019 that he joined Mike Bloomberg's exploratory 2020 presidential campaign as a pollster.

Schoen served on the Advisory Council of Represent.Us, a nonpartisan anti-corruption organization.

In 2019, Schoen served as a Fellow at the USC Center for the Political Future.

== Views ==
Schoen has identified as a member of the Democratic Party, but has frequently criticized the party and taken positions on various political topics at odds with the party's views. Schoen's critics have called his identification as a Democrat "phony" and calculated to help his Fox News career. Steve Benen called Schoen the quintessential "Fox News Democrat" and said he is "actively hostile towards [Democrats] and the party's agenda."

In 2010, Schoen said that lower taxes would be a successful Democratic strategy, opposed President Barack Obama's Affordable Care Act, and said that Obama should not run for reelection in 2012.

He has stated that Obama divided the country along partisan lines, and said that the Affordable Care Act has been a "disaster" for the Democratic Party.

Schoen has been critical of the Occupy Wall Street protest movement. In a 2011 The Wall Street Journal op-ed, he wrote, "President Obama and the Democratic leadership are making a critical error in embracing the Occupy Wall Street movement—and it may cost them the 2012 election." He believes that the protesters represent "an unrepresentative segment of the electorate that believes in radical redistribution of wealth, civil disobedience and, in some instances, violence," and that their common bond is "a deep commitment to left-wing policies." Schoen believes that the Democratic Party should not appeal to voters who support taxing oil companies and the rich, but rather to voters in the middle who want lower taxes.

In an interview with NPR on January 26, 2021, Schoen advocated against the second impeachment of Donald Trump, claiming it was divisive and distracting.

== Works ==
- Enoch Powell and the Powellites, Palgrave Macmillan, 1977.
- The Power of the Vote: Electing Presidents, Overthrowing Dictators, and Promoting Democracy Around the World, HarperCollins, 2007
- Declaring independence: the beginning of the end of the two-party system, New York: Random House, 2008, ISBN 9781400067336, OCLC 173683636
- The threat closer to home: Hugo Chávez and the war against America, New York: Free Press, 2009, ISBN 9781416594772, OCLC 213839994
- Hopelessly divided : the new crisis in American politics and what it means for 2012 and beyond, Lanham, Md.: Rowman & Littlefield Publishers, 2012, ISBN 9781442215238, OCLC 759173285
- The Nixon effect: how Richard Nixon's presidency fundamentally changed American politics, New York; London: Encounter Books, 2016, ISBN 9781594037993, OCLC 891619019
- America in the age of Trump: opportunities and oppositions in an unsettled world, New York: Encounter Books, 2017, ISBN 9781594039478, OCLC 969830291
- The End of Democracy: Russia and China on the Rise, America in Retreat, Regan Arts, 2020
