= Peru–United States Trade Promotion Agreement =

Bilateral free trade agreement

- Long title: The United States-Peru Free Trade Agreement
- Acronyms (colloquial): PTPA
- Enacted by: the 110th United States Congress
- Effective: February 1, 2009

Citations
- Public law: 110-138
- Statutes at Large: 121 Stat. 1455

Legislative history
- Introduced in the House as H.R. 3688; Passed the House on November 8, 2007 (272-155, Roll call vote 1060, via Clerk.House.gov); Passed the Senate on December 4, 2007 (77-18); Signed into law by President George W. Bush on December 14, 2007

The United States–Peru Trade Promotion Agreement (Spanish: Acuerdo de Promoción Comercial Perú – Estados Unidos o Tratado de Libre Comercio Perú – Estados Unidos) is a bilateral free trade agreement, whose objectives are eliminating obstacles to trade, consolidating access to goods and services and fostering private investment in and between the United States and Peru. Besides commercial issues, it incorporates economic, institutional, intellectual property, labor and environmental policies, among others. The agreement was signed on April 12, 2006; ratified by the Peruvian Congress on June 28, 2006; by the U.S. House of Representatives on November 2, 2007, and by the U.S. Senate on December 4, 2007. The Agreement was implemented on February 1, 2009.

== History ==
On December 4, 1991, under the George H. W. Bush administration, the United States enacted the Andean Trade Preference Act, eliminating tariffs on a number of products from Peru, Bolivia, Colombia, and Ecuador. Its objective was the strengthening of legal industries in these countries as alternatives to drug production and trafficking. The program was renewed on October 31, 2002, by the George W. Bush administration as the Andean Trade Promotion and Drug Eradication Act. Under the renewed act, Andean products exempted from tariffs increased from around 5,600 to some 6,300. The new act was set to expire on December 31, 2006, but was renewed by Congress for six months, up to June 30, 2007. A further extension was granted on June 28, 2007, this time for eight months, up to February 29, 2008.

On November 18, 2003, the U.S. Trade Representative, Robert Zoellick, notified Congress of the intention of the Bush administration to initiate negotiations for a free trade agreement with the countries involved in the Andean trade act. Negotiations started without Bolivia in May 2004, however, as each of the three remaining Andean countries decided to pursue bilateral agreements with the United States. After 13 rounds of negotiations, Peru and the United States concluded an agreement on December 7, 2005. Alfredo Ferrero, Peruvian Minister of Foreign Trade and Tourism, and the U.S. Trade Representative Rob Portman signed the deal on April 12, 2006, in Washington, D.C., in the presence of Peruvian President Alejandro Toledo.

The Congress of Peru debated the agreement for six hours during the night of June 27, 2006 and ratified it in the early hours of the next day. The vote was 79–14, with seven abstentions. The U.S. House of Representatives approved the agreement on November 8, 2007, with a 285–132 vote. The U.S. Senate approved the agreement on December 4, 2007, with a 77–18 vote. The implementation bills gained wide support from the Republican Party (176–16 in the House, 47–1 in the Senate) and split backing from the Democratic Party (109–116 and 29–17).

On January 16, 2009, President George W. Bush signed a proclamation To Implement the United States-Peru Trade Promotion Agreement and for Other Purposes, effective February 1, 2009.

== Potential benefits ==
Peru is interested in the agreement in order to:

- consolidate and extend the trade preferences under the Andean Trade Promotion and Drug Eradication Act
- attract foreign investment
- generate employment
- enhance the country's competitiveness within the region
- increase workers' income
- curb poverty levels.
- create and export sugar cane ethanol.

The United States looks to this agreement as a way to:

- improve access to goods and services
- strengthen its investments
- promote security and democracy
- fight against drug trafficking

== Sensitive topics ==
- Intellectual property
  - Patent protection
  - No discrimination against foreign investors
  - Elimination of export subsidies
  - Schedule for tariff reduction
  - Application of farming safeguard measures
  - Technical cooperation and assistance programs
  - Effective enforcement of environmental legislation
  - Sovereignty to adopt and modify environmental legislation
  - Mechanisms for environmental cooperation
- Labor
  - Rigorous enforcement of national legislation
  - Fundamental International Labour Organization treaties
  - Sovereignty to modify legislation
  - Mechanisms for cooperation
- Environment/Animal Welfare
  - Habitat Loss Due to Expansion of Mining Development
  - Increased U.S. pork and poultry exports funding factory farming
  - Legislation to protect animals could be seen as trade barrier

== Criticism ==
The agreement has suffered consistent criticism. In Peru, the treaty was championed by Toledo, and supported to different extents by President-elect Alan García and candidates Lourdes Flores and Valentín Paniagua. The 2006 election's runner-up Ollanta Humala has been its most vocal critic. Humala's Union for Peru won 45 of 120 seats in Congress, the largest share by a single party, prompting the debate and ratification of the agreement before the new legislature was sworn in. Some Congressmen-elect interrupted the debate after forcibly entering Congress, in an attempt to stop the agreement ratification.

Critics of the Peru TPA say the pact will worsen Peru's problems with child labor and weak labor rights, and expose the country's subsistence farmers to disruptive competition with subsidized U.S. crops. Additionally, critics contend that Dubai Ports World will be able to use its Peruvian subsidiary to obtain rights to operate U.S. ports. Animal rights groups have opposed this legislation due to the possibility of spreading factory farming practices through Latin America, increasing U.S. pork and poultry exports, and mining development that causes deforestation and habitat loss for animals.

The most controversial elements of the agreement relate to forestry. Laura Carlsen, of the Center for International Policy, and contributor to Foreign Policy in Focus notes that "Indigenous organizations warn that this ruling effectively opens up 45 million hectares to foreign investment and timber, oil, and mining exploitation."

Prior to the implementation of the FTA the Peruvian government rolled back existing environmental protections in order to implement the FTA's foreign investor rights provisions to access forestry, mining and other natural resources. This included access to sensitive Amazonian territories over which indigenous communities had control under pre-FTA Peruvian law. Protests by indigenous communities in the Amazon against the execution of the free trade agreement, and related new foreign investors accessing rights to indigenous lands, have been deadly. As the opposition for this grew there was a confrontation back in June 2009 near the town of Bagua in the northern province of Amazonas, which according to official reports left a death toll of 34. Faced with this widespread unrest, the Peruvian Congress repealed two additional decrees that redefined forest land to permit more logging and mining.

The government had made a mistake by failing to consult with indigenous communities before passing 10 decrees that modified Peru's legal and regulatory framework on access to and use of natural resources in the country's Amazon jungle region. The decrees were declared unconstitutional in December 2008 by a multi-party parliamentary commission because they undermined the right of native people to prior consultation with respect to mining projects or other economic activities affecting their communities. Indigenous groups in Peru's Amazon are demanding that their land rights are acknowledged by national government, as well as being able to participate and be consulted on decisions or legislation that could affect them. A majority feel anger towards the fact that they were not consulted about the series of decrees passed by the government after the implementation of the FTA with the US.

Between January 2008 and June 2009, the government auctioned 7,700 square miles of land for mining, including forest area that is the ancestral home of the Awajun and Wampis indigenous groups. In addition to this legal mining, illegal mining in the Peruvian rainforest has skyrocketed since international gold prices have reached new heights (increasing 35 percent since FTA implementation). Indigenous land as well as parts of the Amazon rainforest are being lost at an alarming rate because of this activity. In October 2007 the AIDESEP, a Federation Representing 350,000 Indigenous Peoples in Amazon Region, sent a letter to congress and made the following statement: "The FTA will give incentives for further and irreversible destruction of virgin rainforest, which will in turn increase global warming and displace our communities from their home territories… Provisions contained in the Peru FTA are directly incentivizing this massive takeover that is threatening our livelihoods and leading to irreversible destruction of virgin rainforest".

A cross-party congressional commission, created after the indigenous protests in the Amazon in August 2008, recommended the repeal of two of the laws that opened up communally-owned native lands to private investment. Decree 1015 introduced substantial changes to the decision-making process for community property such that the sale or leasing of communal lands no longer requiring approval by two-thirds of qualified community members, but just a simple majority of those members of the community attending an assembly meeting. Degree 1073 modified this arrangement, which stated that these community members must have occupied or used land during the preceding year. In 2008, the indigenous people involved in the Interethnic Associations of the Peruvian Amazon (AIDESEP) demanded that the decrees be repealed. However, when Congress failed to implement the repeal of these decrees that affected indigenous people's rights, new protests began in April 2009.

== See also ==
- Colombia Trade Promotion Agreement
- Rules of Origin
- Market access
- Free-trade area
- Tariffs
