= Andean Trade Promotion and Drug Eradication Act =

Law voted in 2002 by the American Congress

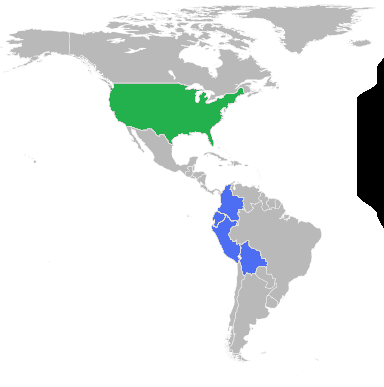
Map of the countries that make up ATPDEA

The Andean Trade Promotion and Drug Eradication Act (ATPDEA) is a trade preference system by which the United States grants duty-free access to a wide range of exports from four Andean countries: Bolivia, Colombia, Ecuador and Peru. It was enacted on October 31, 2002 as a replacement for the similar Andean Trade Preference Act (ATPA). The purpose of this preference system is to foster economic development in the Andean countries to provide alternatives to coca production. Bolivia has installed capacity to industrialize coca production and its derivatives, since coca has no narcotic effects, but the United States does not make any difference between coca and cocaine. Thus, the U.S. government eliminated this "preference".

== History ==
On December 4, 1991, under the George H. W. Bush administration, the United States enacted the Andean Trade Preference Act (ATPA), eliminating tariffs on a number of products from Bolivia, Colombia, Ecuador, and Peru. Its objective was the strengthening of legal industries in these countries as alternatives to drug production and trafficking. The program was renewed on October 31, 2002 by the George W. Bush administration as the Andean Trade Promotion and Drug Eradication Act (ATPDEA). Under the renewed act, Andean products exempted from tariffs increased from around 5,600 to some 6,300. ATPDEA was set to expire on December 31, 2006, but was renewed by Congress for six months, up to June 30, 2007. An extension was granted on June 28, 2007, this time for eight months, until February 29, 2008. The U.S. Congress passed a third renewal for ten months on February 28, 2008, up to December 31, 2008. In November 2008, U.S. President George W. Bush asked Congress to remove Bolivia from the agreement due to failure to cooperate in counternarcotics efforts. On December 14, 2009, the United States House of Representatives approved the extension of such plan for a period of one year. The final version of the agreement, covering Ecuadorian products only, lapsed on July 31, 2013 after Ecuador became ineligible.

== Impact ==
The Andean Trade Promotion and Drug Eradication Act has fostered rapid growth in trade between the United States and the four Andean nations; U.S. exports to the region rose from $6.46 billion in 2002 to $11.64 billion in 2006, while imports grew from $9.61 billion to $22.51 billion in the same period. As of 2006 main Andean exports to the United States under ATPDEA were oil, apparel, copper cathodes, cut flowers, gold jewelry, asparagus, and sugar. Of the 2006 total of U.S. imports under ATPDEA, Ecuador accounted for 39%, Colombia for 36%, Peru for 24%, and Bolivia for 1%. According to a September 2006 report by the United States International Trade Commission, ATPDEA has had a negative effect on the U.S. economy and consumers as well as a small positive effect on drug-crop reduction and export-related job creation in the Andean region. A 2006 report by the United States Department of Labor stated that ATPDEA does not appear to have had a negative impact on U.S. employment with the possible exception of some sectors of the cut flower industry.

== See also ==
- Colombia Trade Promotion Agreement
- United States-Peru Trade Promotion Agreement

== Bibliography ==
- Office of the United States Trade Representative. New Andean Trade Benefits. September 25, 2002.
- Office of the United States Trade Representative. "Third Report to the Congress on the Operation of the Andean Trade Preference Act" (PDF). Archived from the original (PDF) on 2008-06-05. (181 KiB), January 31, 2001.
- Office of the United States Trade Representative. "Third Report to the Congress on the Operation of the Andean Trade Preference Act as Amended" (PDF). Archived from the original (PDF) on 2008-09-20. (310 KiB). April 30, 2007.
- Reuters. Congress extends Andean trade benefits 10 months. February 28, 2008.
- Reuters. US Senate OKs 8-month Andean trade pact extension. June 28, 2007.
- The White House. Andean Trade Promotion and Drug Eradication Act. October 31, 2002.
