= United States–Colombia Free Trade Agreement =

2006 free trade agreement

The United States-Colombia Trade Promotion Agreement (CTPA) (Spanish: Tratado de Libre Comercio entre Colombia y Estados Unidos or TLC) is a bilateral free trade agreement between the United States and Colombia. Sometimes called the Colombia Free Trade Agreement, it was signed on November 22, 2006, by Deputy U.S. Trade Representative John Veroneau and Colombian Minister of Trade, Industry, and Tourism Jorge Humberto Botero. CTPA is a comprehensive agreement that will eliminate tariffs and other barriers to trade in goods and services between the United States and Colombia, including government procurement, investment, telecommunications, electronics commerce, intellectual property rights, and labor and environmental protection The United States Congress. Colombia's Congress approved the agreement and a protocol of amendment in 2007. Colombia's Constitutional Court completed its review in July 2008, and concluded that the Agreement conforms to Colombia's Constitution. President Obama tasked the Office of the U.S. Trade Representative with seeking a path to address outstanding issues surrounding the Colombia FTA. The United States Congress then took on the agreement and passed it on October 12, 2011. The agreement went into effect on May 15, 2012.

== Economic relationship ==
The United States is Colombia's leading trading partner. In 2005, 39% of Colombia's exports went to the United States, and 29% of Colombia's imports were supplied by the United States. The second most significant trading partner for Colombia is Venezuela, accounting for 7% of Colombia's imports and 10% of Colombia's exports. Other significant trading partners for Colombia are Mexico, Ecuador, Germany, and Brazil.

Colombia is the 28th largest U.S. export market ($5.41 billion in 2005) and the 31st largest source of U.S. imports ($8.85 billion in 2005). The dominant U.S. import item from Colombia is crude oil (38% of U.S. imports from Colombia in 2005), followed by coal, other petroleum oils, precious and semi-precious stones, coffee, tea, and flowers and plants.

Two-thirds of U.S. exports to Colombia are manufactured goods. The top U.S. exports are chemicals, plastics, electrical equipment, excavating machinery, telecommunications equipment, computers and computer accessories, industrial engines, and drilling and oilfield equipment. For the last seven years, Colombia has been receiving $10 billion to $15 billion annually in foreign direct investment, and has been rapidly developing its mining sector. As a result, Colombia is the sixth-largest market in the world for large earthmoving equipment manufactured by Caterpillar Inc., a U.S. manufacturer of bulldozers and other earthmoving machinery, despite a Colombian tariff of five to fifteen percent.

U.S. agricultural exports benefiting under the agreement include beef and pork products, wheat, corn, soybeans, and cotton. The agreement would grant immediate duty-free access to export categories most important to the U.S. beef industry, such as USDA Prime and Choice beef cuts. All other tariffs on beef would be eliminated, with the final tariffs removed within 15 years. Colombian tariffs on pork products ranging from 20 to 30 percent, would be phased out to zero within 5 to 15 years. The U.S. International Trade Commission estimates the fully implemented agreement would boost U.S. beef exports to Colombia by 46 percent and pork exports by 72 percent. Colombian tariffs of 5 to 20 percent for wheat and soybeans would be immediately eliminated; with a 25 percent tariff on corn to be phased out over 12 years. The agreement would immediately eliminate the 10 percent duty on U.S. cotton upon enactment

U.S. imports from Colombia have increased notably since 1996, from $4.27 billion in 1996 to $8.85 billion in 2005, a 107% increase. The U.S. trade deficit with Colombia was $3.43 billion in 2005. Since late 2006, U.S. products have been charged more than $3.4 billion in Colombian tariffs and duties that otherwise would have been eliminated by the free trade agreement. The U.S. International Trade Commission estimates that the agreement would boost U.S. exports to Colombia by an additional $1.1 billion per year.

== History ==
In May 2004, the United States initiated free trade agreement negotiations with Colombia, Peru, and Ecuador. The United States concluded negotiations with Colombia in February 2006 and the CTPA was signed on November 22, 2006. After, based on "the New Trade Policy Template", a bipartisan agreement, both countries negotiated a Protocol of Amendment that was signed on June 28, 2007.

=== Process in Colombia ===
The agreement was signed on November 22, 2006, was submitted to the Colombian Congress by President Álvaro Uribe on November 30, 2006. The Bill was debated and voted in a joint session on April 25, 2007. The House Floor approved it on June 5, 2007 (Yeas 85, Nays 10) and the Senate Floor vote on June 14, 2007 (Yeas 55, Nays 3). Finally, the CTPA became public law - Ley 1143 - on July 4, 2007.

The Protocol of Amendment, signed on June 28, 2007, was submitted to the Colombian Congress by, Uribe on July 20 of 2007. The Bill was approved in a joint session on August 29, 2007, and voted by the House Floor on September 25, 2007 (Yeas 84, Nays 3). After, the Senate Floor approved the Bill on October 30, 2007 (Yeas 54, Nays 16). Finally, the Protocol of Amendment became public Law – Ley 1116 – on November 21, 2007.

The Agreement then underwent a constitutionally mandated court review, according to Colombian regulations. The agreement was deemed to conform to the Colombian Constitution by Colombia's Constitutional Court in July 2008.

Aspects of the agreement relating to copyright were planned to be implemented in Colombia Bill no. 201 of 2012.

=== Process in the U.S. ===
President Bush sent legislation to implement the U.S.-Colombia Trade Promotion Agreement to Congress for its approval on April 7, 2007. It was not approved before the end of the Congressional session in December 2008 or the end of President Bush's term in January 2009.

President Obama asked the Office of the U.S. Trade Representative to address outstanding issues in the agreement; however, during a visit from Colombian President Uribe in June 2009, Obama said he did not have a "strict timetable" to the agreement, as controversy over the safety of Colombian labor leaders continue. U.S. Congress' failure to secure approval of the Colombia Free Trade Agreement has adversely affected bilateral relations between the two nations.

On October 12, 2011 after renegotiating parts of the agreement, it was passed by the House 262–167 and the Senate 66–33. An aid program for displaced workers called Trade Adjustment Assistance (TAA) was also included in the bill.

== Key provisions of the U.S.-Colombia Trade Promotion Agreement ==
=== Market access ===
Upon implementation, the agreement would eliminate duties on 80% of U.S. exports of consumer and industrial products to Colombia. An additional 7% of U.S. exports would receive duty-free treatment within five years of implementation. Remaining tariffs would be eliminated ten years after implementation. Colombia will join the World Trade Organization's (WTO) Information Technology Agreement (ITA), which would remove Colombia's trade barriers to information technology products.

In agriculture, the agreement would grant duty-free treatment immediately to certain farm products from both countries, including high quality beef, cotton, wheat, and soybean meal. Other products that would receive immediate duty-free treatment are key fruits and vegetables, including apples, pears, peaches, and cherries, and many processed food products, including frozen French fries and cookies. Some other products would receive improved market access; these include pork, beef, corn, poultry, rice, fruits and vegetables, processed products, and dairy products. The United States and Colombia worked together to resolve sanitary and phytosanitary barriers to trade in agriculture, including food safety inspection procedures for beef, pork, and poultry. These commitments are reportedly written in two separate side letters on sanitary and phytosanitary measures that would be attached to the FTA.

== Allegations of human rights violations ==
In the first 10 months of the Santos administration in Colombia, 104 labor and human rights activists were murdered. One category of human rights abuses involves the murder of over 50 labor leaders from the Legal Left at the hands of paramilitaries and death squads, and sometimes there have been allegations of involvement on the part of multinational corporations. In a few cases, this has resulted in damaging public allegations and even court cases for several multinational corporations from the U.S. and Canada (including Dole, Coca-Cola, Drummond Coal, and Chiquita, formerly known as the United Fruit Company). The Colombian Sintraminercol mining union has alleged that many international mining companies already working in Colombia have a record of paramilitary collaboration, as well as environmental negligence. The agreement has had much difficulty passing Congress for years due to the persistence of these issues.

The following videos, launched by the U.S. Office on Colombia on June 23, 2011, provide testimony from Colombian citizens on the impact of the FTA on:

- Afro-Colombian and indigenous communities
- Small-scale workers and farmers
- Colombian civil society

Political violence had greatly lessened in Colombia over the past decade, however, and objections to the trade agreement have been criticized by Colombians and the Republican party. Conservative Canadian Prime Minister Stephen Harper, who signed a Canada - Colombia agreement that took effect in August 2011, has accused opponents of trade deals with the country as "standing in the way of the development of the prosperity of Colombia," adding that "we can't block the progress of a country like this for protectionist reasons and try to use human rights as a front for doing that."

== See also ==
- Peru-United States Free Trade Agreement
- Área de Libre Comercio de las Américas (ALCA), English name: Free Trade Area of the Americas
- Andean Trade Promotion and Drug Eradication Act
- Rules of Origin
- Market access
- Free-trade area
- Tariffs
