= Agreement for the Control of Opium Smoking in the Far East =

1931 drug control treaty

- Signed: November 27, 1931
- Location: Bangkok
- Effective: April 22, 1937
- Signatories: 8
- Parties: 8

The Agreement for the Control of Opium Smoking in the Far East, also known as the Agreement concerning the Suppression of Opium Smoking, was a treaty concluded in Bangkok on 27 November 1931 and at Lake Success, New York on 11 December 1946. The treaty was signed and ratified by the State of Vietnam, France, British India, Japan, Laos, Netherlands, Thailand, and United Kingdom.

Article I provided that retail sale and distribution of opium would be limited to Government shops. Fixed salaries were mandated for retailers; sales commissions were abolished. A system of licensing and rationing smokers was permitted as an alternative to the Government retail provisions.

Article II prohibited minors under the age of 21 from smoking opium or entering smoking establishments, and mandated prison sentences for inducing minors to smoke opium, to enter an opium-smoking establishment, or to procure opium.

Other provisions mandated that opium be sold for cash only, allowed governments to establish monopolies on opium production, and limited the application of the agreement to the Far East.

The Agreement was superseded by the 1961 Single Convention on Narcotic Drugs.
