= Agreement concerning the Manufacture of, Internal Trade in and Use of Prepared Opium =

1925 multilateral treaty

- Signed: February 11, 1925
- Location: Geneva
- Effective: July 28, 1926
- Signatories: Malcolm Delevingne; Harold Clayton; Édouard Daladier; S. Kaku; Y. Sugimura; V. Wettum; A. D. A. de Kat Angelino; A. M. Bartholomeu Ferreira; Rodrigo J Rodrigues; Prince Damras
- Parties: British Empire; British Raj; France; Japan; Netherlands; Portugal; Siam

The 1925 Geneva Opium Protocol (known as the Agreement concerning the Manufacture of, Internal Trade in and Use of Prepared Opium, officially, the Agreement concerning the Suppression of the Manufacture of, Internal Trade in, and Use of, Prepared Opium) was an international treaty concluded in Geneva, Switzerland, on 11 February 1925.

== History ==
The Agreement was adopted a few days before the Second International Opium Convention, also in Geneva, by the same negotiators. However, the two treaties have no direct relation, different scopes, and non-overlapping control measures. Part of the delegates met in Brussels a few months later to negotiate the Brussels Pharmacopoeia Agreement, also regulated opium, but legally unrelated as well.

The treaty was ratified by the British Empire, the British Raj, France, Japan, the Netherlands, Portugal, and Siam.

The Agreement stated that the signatory nations were "fully determined to bring about the gradual and effective suppression of the manufacture of, internal trade in and use of prepared opium". Article I required that, with the exception of retail sale, the importation, sale and distribution of opium be a monopoly of government, which would have the exclusive right to import, sell, or distribute opium. Leasing, according, or delegating this right was specifically prohibited. Article II prohibited sale of opium to minors, and Article III prohibited minors from entering smoking divans. Article IV required governments to limit the number of opium retail shops and smoking divans as much as possible. Articles V and VI regulated the export and transport of opium and dross. Article VII required governments to discourage the use of opium through instruction in schools, literature, and other methods.

The Agreement was superseded by the 1961 Single Convention on Narcotic Drugs.
