= Charles R. Black Jr. =

American lobbyist and businessman

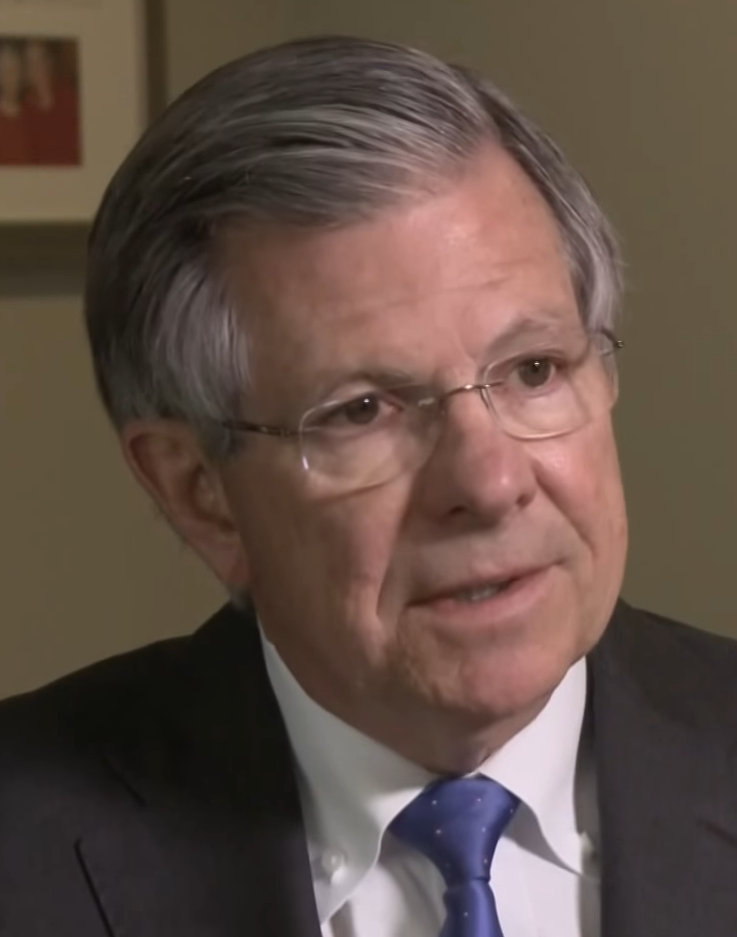
- Black in 2016
- Born: October 11, 1947 (age 78); Wilmington, North Carolina, U.S.
- Education: University of Florida (BA); American University (JD)
- Occupations: Lobbyist, political adviser
- Political party: Republican
- Board member of: No Labels

Charles R. Black Jr. (born October 11, 1947) is an American lobbyist and businessman, who is the Founding Chairman of Prime Policy Group, a public affairs firm which is now a subsidiary of Burson Cohn & Wolfe. Prime Policy Group was formed with the merger of Martin B. Gold's Gold & Liebengood with the Washington, DC–based lobbying firm he co-founded—BMSK—with Paul Manafort, Roger J. Stone, and Peter G. Kelly. In 2010, Black was inducted into the American Association of Political Consultants (AAPC) Hall of Fame.

Black is a "longtime Washington lobbyist" who through 2008 "worked in every Republican presidential campaign" since 1972. He worked for Ronald Reagan's three presidential campaigns in 1976, 1980 and 1984 and was a senior political adviser to the 1992 re-election campaign of George H. W. Bush. He served as chief campaign adviser for Senator John McCain in the 2008 presidential election and was an informal adviser to Governor Mitt Romney's presidential campaign during the 2012 presidential election. In 2016, Black worked as a campaign adviser for Governor John Kasich in the 2016 presidential election.

== Education ==
Black earned a BA in Political Science from the University of Florida in 1969 and a JD from American University's school of law in 1974.

== Political campaigns ==
Black says that he fell in love with politics when he worked on the presidential campaign of Republican Barry Goldwater as a high school student in 1964.

In 1972, he was a campaign worker in the first senatorial campaign of Jesse Helms running against Nick Galifianakis.

Black co-founded the National Conservative Political Action Committee (NCPAC) with Terry Dolan and Roger Stone.

Black went on to work for a succession of Republican presidential campaigns from 1976 to 1992, including those of Ronald Reagan and George H. W. Bush. His first hire on the Reagan campaign was Lee Atwater, whom he met during the course of his work with the Republican National Committee in 1972. Later Black served as the National Spokesperson for the RNC. He re-emerged as an adviser to George W. Bush's campaigns in 2000 and 2004, and was often quoted as White House spokesperson. He has been described as an "iconic Republican operative."

Black was Senator John McCain's chief strategist in the 2008 presidential election.

In a June 2008 Fortune magazine interview, Black said that McCain's "knowledge and ability to talk about" the "chaos lurking in the world", specifically the "unfortunate event" of Benazir Bhutto's assassination in December "reemphasized that [McCain] was "the guy who's ready to be Commander-in-Chief. And it helped us." Black also "conceded with startling candor" that "another terrorist attack on U.S. soil" "would be a big advantage to [McCain].

During the 2016 presidential election Black was Governor John Kasich's campaign advisor.

== Lobbying activity ==
In 1980 he co-founded the Washington, DC–based lobbying firm Black, Manafort and Stone with principals Paul Manafort, and Roger Stone. In 1984, Peter Kelly joined the firm and the name became BMSK. The firm became one of "Washington's most influential" and merged to form BKSH & Associates Worldwide in 1996.

In a 2008 interview with The Atlantic, Black defended BMSK against campaign ads made by MoveOn.org opposing John McCain. The ads asserted that Black "made millions lobbying for the world's worst tyrants". Black described how his lobbying firm "ran every potential foreign client by the State Department and/or the White House in whatever administration was in power and asked whether the scope of the work fit with American foreign policy goals." During the Reagan administration, then-President of the Philippines, Ferdinand Marcos was one of Black's clients until Marcos "tried to steal the election" and "Reagan pulled the plug... [BMSK] resigned the account the same day". When Zaire's Mobuto Sese Seko was his client, the "State Department was encouraging [Mobuto] to hold parliamentary elections and [BMSK] firm advised Sese Seko on how to conduct such elections." However, when Mobutu rejected the election results and became a dictator, BMSK resigned.

By 2008, BMSK & Associates was owned by Burson Marsteller, and was run by Mark Penn. BMSK's CEO was R. Scott Pastrick who was a former treasurer of the Democratic National Committee and a supporter of Hillary Clinton.

Prime Policy Group is the result of the merger of two lobbying firms in Washington in 2010, Black, Manafort, Stone and Kelly & Associates Worldwide and Timmons & Company.

Prime Policy Group represents large companies, trade and industry associations, foreign governments, state governments and municipalities, including Airbus and Google.
