= BKSH & Associates Worldwide =

American lobbying firm

BKSH Associates Worldwide
- Founded: 1996
- Headquarters: Washington, D.C.

Black, Kelly, Scruggs & Healey, also known as BKSH & Associates, was a Washington, D.C.–based lobbying firm with principals Charles R. Black Jr., Peter G. Kelly, John F. Scruggs, and James Healey which was merged with Timmons & Company in 2010 to form Prime Policy Group.

== History ==
The firm came into being in 1996 through the merger of D.C. firms Black, Manafort, Stone and Kelly (BMSK or Black, Manafort) and Gold & Liebengood by Martin B. Gold. BMSK, was established in 1980 as a Washington, DC–based lobbying firm by principals Paul Manafort, Charles R. Black Jr., Roger J. Stone and Peter G. Kelly. In 1981, the Manafort, Black, and Stone "started a separate lobbying company by the same name". Democrat Peter Kelly and "legendary GOP adviser" Lee Atwater joined them "in subsequent years". Scruggs was with them from 1998 to 2004.

== Controversy ==
In 2003, it was internationally criticized for its representation of Ahmad Chalabi and the Iraqi National Congress for their support of the War on Iraq, which was primarily based on intelligence provided by the group which was later proved to be false.
