= Ukrainian News Agency =

Media outlet

Ukrainian News Agency Інформаційне агентство "Українські Новини"
- Industry: News agency
- Founded: 1993
- Headquarters: Kyiv, Ukraine
- Website: www.ukranews.com

The Ukrainian News Agency (Ukrainian: Інформаційне агентство "Українські Новини", romanized: Informatsiine ahentstvo "Ukrainski Novyny" [informɐˈts⁽ʲ⁾ijne ɐˈɦɛnstwo ʊkrɐˈjinʲsʲki noˈwɪnɪ]) is a Kyiv-based Ukrainian news agency. It produces and provides political, business and financial information, as well as a popular photo reporting service. Since February 2008 the company is part of the Inter Media Group Ltd., formerly U.A. Inter Media Group, which itself is a subsidiary of the Russian-based company GDF Media Ltd. Inter Media Group Limited also owns 61% of the Ukrainian TV channel Inter.

Founded in 1993, by Mykhailo Kolomiets and Volodymyr Hranovskiy, the agency is now used by about 10,000 clients daily. It offers 27 information and analytical products in Russian, Ukrainian and English. Ukrainian News is the only agency in Ukraine that translates 100% of its products into English.

Valery Khoroshkovsky held a 50% stake of Ukrainian News because Mykhailo Kolomiets 50% stake was nominal and the other 50% stake was held by the Agency for Humanitarian Technologies (AHT) (Russian: Агентство гуманитарных технологий (АГТ)) which lists Viktor Pinchuk as its owner. Maxim Karizhsky, the general director of AHT, however, stated that Pinchuk is not the owner of AHT. AHT signed an agreement with the United States public relations firm Black, Kelly, Scruggs & Healey (BKSH) for the period of 1 January 2001 to 30 September 2001. Volodymyr Granovsky established Humanitarian Technologies agency. (Note: Black, Kelly, Scruggs & Healey (BKSH) had formerly been the firm Black, Manafort, Stone and Kelly (BMSK) before 1991 after which it merged with several other firms to form BKSH.)

On 18 November 2002, the body of founder Mykhailo Kolomiets was found dead hanging from a tree near Molodechno, Belarus, after being missing for four weeks. He met with Volodymyr Hranovskiy just before he deleted all files on his computer and left for Minsk on 22 October 2001. On 30 October 2001, his body was found and he was buried two weeks later as unidentified. (Note: Volodymyr Mykolayovych Hranovskyy (Ukrainian: Володимир Миколайович Грановський; born 1966 Kyiv, Ukrainian SSR, Soviet Union) received a philosophical degree in Moscow and returned to Kyiv to advise World Bank or Svitovy Bank (Ukrainian: Світовий банк) and the National Council of Ukraine on Television and Radio Broadcasting. He co-founded Ukrainian News. He worked with the channel Inter until 2006 but allegedly received $2 million from the Party of Regions on 8 June 2012 for channel Inter. Hranovskyy is very close to Dmitro Firtash and co-founded the Ukraine Modernization Agency (Russian: Агентство модернизации Украины) in 2015. In 2017, he began working with NewsOne. On 10 June 2021, he became the general producer of the Yevhen Muraev owned NASH (Ukrainian: НАШ).)

In May 2006, the agency opened a modern press conference hall.

The agency has its own building. It is located just outside Palats Sportu subway station in central Kyiv.
