= Martin Gold =

Martin Gold may refer to:

- Marty Gold (1915–2011), American composer, pianist and bandleader
- Martin B. Gold (born 1947), American lawyer
