= Serhiy Lyovochkin =

Ukrainian politician and oligarch

- Сергій Льовочкін
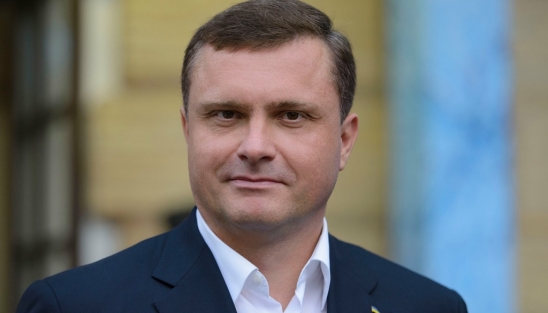
- Lyovochkin in 2016

Head of Presidential Administration of Ukraine
- In office 25 February 2010 – 17 January 2014
- President: Viktor Yanukovych
- Preceded by: Vira Ulianchenko
- Succeeded by: Andriy Klyuyev

Personal details
- Born: 17 July 1972 (age 54) Kyiv, Ukrainian SSR, Soviet Union
- Party: Opposition Platform — For Life (2018–2022)
- Other political affiliations: Opposition Bloc (2014–2018); Party of Regions (2007–2014); People's Party
- Spouse: Zinaida Kubar
- Children: 3
- Education: Kyiv National Economic University; Ukrainian Academy of Foreign Trade
- Profession: Economist; jurist; politician
- Website: lovochkin.org

Serhiy Volodymyrovych Lyovochkin (Ukrainian: Сергій Володимирович Льовочкін; born 17 July 1972) is a Ukrainian politician, formerly a member of the Parliament of Ukraine. Over 20 years, he has held various leading posts in civil service as well as top corporate positions.

== Early life ==
In 1989 he graduated from the prestigious Kyiv school and entered the Kyiv Institute of National Economy (since 1992 Kyiv National Economic University), where he studied until 1993 and received a degree in economics, specialty "Accounting, control and analysis of economic activity." Then there until 1997, a graduate student, Department of Finance; PhD thesis "of US government debt." Candidate of Sciences (1997). In 1999-2002 he studied at the Ukrainian Academy of Foreign Trade, from which he graduated with a master's degree in the specialty "International law".

In 2004 he defended his doctoral thesis on "The economic growth in the context of the Macro-financial stabilization in Ukraine." Author of more than 30 scientific papers, including 2 monographs. Associate Professor of the Department of Finance in the alma mater.

== Career ==
He began his career immediately after finishing graduate school in 1996, deputy chairman of the private bank.

In 1996–1999, the executive director of the Foundation to promote socio-economic development of the Donetsk region.

Since 1999, he entered the civil service. In the 1998 elections, he ran for the deputies of Ukraine in the electoral district in Donetsk region, lost, taking 2nd place.

Lovochkin has worked in administration of President Leonid Kuchma (1999-2004) where he led Group of advisors and economy reforming staff.

In the 2006 Ukrainian parliamentary election he had failed to do so for Lytvyn Bloc (Lytvyn Bloc had won no seats).

In the 2007 Ukrainian parliamentary election Lovochkin was elected into the Ukrainian parliament for Party of Regions. (Note: Through Rinat Akhmetov and following the Orange Revolution, Paul Manafort began advising pro-Russia Victor Yanukovych in Yanukovych's quest to defeat his pro-Western rival Viktor A. Yushchenko.)

During his tenure as Head of Administration for President Victor Yanukovich (2010–2013), Mr. Lovochkin had implemented significant government initiatives, including Program for economy reforms, Chernobyl new sarcophagus Program, Program of non-proliferation of nuclear materials.

From 2011 to 2013 with liaison to Lyovochkin, Alan Friedman, Eckart Sager, who was a one time CNN producer, Rick Gates, Paul Manafort, and Manafort's senior aide Konstantin Kilimnik devised a strategy to discredit Yulia Tymoshenko along with Hillary Clinton. This effort supported the pro-Russia administration of then President of Ukraine Viktor Yanukovych and his Party of Regions, especially during the parliamentary elections in the fall of 2012.

On 30 November 2013, Lovochkin submitted a resignation letter as a gesture of disagreement with the violent actions against Maidan activists.

On 1 February 2013, Lovochkin and his business associate Dmytro Vasylovych Firtash, a Ukrainian natural gas magnate, (Note: As a middleman for the Russian natural gas giant Gazprom, Fyrtash funneled money into the campaigns of pro-Russia politicians in Ukraine.) purchased Ukraine's Inter Media Group which owns the Ukrainian News and Inter television network, one of the most watched television channels in Ukraine.

In 2014 after the revolutionary events of Euromaidan and to replace of the Progressive Democratic Party, he created a new party, the Party of Development of Ukraine which has the same abbreviation in the Ukrainian language as the Party of Regions.

In September 2014, Paul Manafort traveled to Ukraine and supported the creation of a new Ukrainian political party Opposition Bloc.

On 15 September 2014, following Manafort's advice, Lyovochkin's Party of Development of Ukraine united with 5 other parties to form the Opposition Bloc.

In the 2014 Ukrainian parliamentary election on 26 October, Lovochkin was re-elected into parliament placed 12th on the electoral list of Opposition Bloc.

Lovochkin stated in October 2014 that Crimea was annexed by Russia in March 2014 because Russian President Vladimir "Putin was betrayed by our irresponsible leaders too many times, until he stopped taking Ukraine seriously".

On 9 November 2018, Lovochkin's Party of Development of Ukraine co-chaired by Yuriy Boiko and the party For life led by Vadym Rabinovich signed a cooperation agreement for both the 2019 Ukrainian presidential election and the parliamentary election of the same year forming the Opposition Platform — For life. Lyovochkin was excluded from the Opposition Bloc faction (the reason given was) "because they betrayed their voters" interests on 20 November 2018.

Lovochkin was re-elected, placed 5th on the party list of Opposition Platform — For Life this time, in the 2019 parliamentary election. His sister Yulia Lovochkin (Ukrainian: Юлія Льовочкіна) was also elected for the same party (22nd on the party list).

On 23 March 2023, the Rada expelled Lyovochkin from the Committee on National Security, Defense and Intelligence. He is reported to have left the country immediately after the beginning of the Russian invasion of Ukraine in 2022.

=== 2016 Donald Trump campaign and Special Counsel investigation ===
In January 2019, Paul Manafort's lawyers submitted a filing to the court, in response to the Robert Mueller Special Counsel's accusation that Manafort had lied to investigators while supposedly co-operating with the investigation. Through an error in redacting, the document accidentally revealed that while Manafort was Donald Trump's campaign chairman, Manafort met with Konstantin Kilimnik, gave Kilimnik polling data related to Donald Trump's 2016 United States Presidential campaign, and discussed a Ukraine-Russia peace plan for the ongoing conflict in Donbas with Kilimnik. As a Russian Main Intelligence Directorate GRU agent, Konstantin Kilimnik is a known member of Russia's intelligence community. (Note: Manafort has rejected questions about whether Kilimnik, with whom he consulted regularly, might be in league with Russian intelligence. According to Yuri Shvets, Kilimnik previously worked for the GRU, and every bit of information about Kilimnik's work with Manafort went directly to Russian intelligence.) Although most of the polling data was reportedly public, some was private Trump campaign polling data managed by Brad Parscale. (Note: Eric Trump's wife, Lara (née Yunaska) Trump, was the liaison between Donald Trump's 2016 presidential campaign headquarters in Trump Tower and Brad Parscale's Giles-Parscale company.) Manafort asked Kilimnik to pass the data to Ukrainians Rinat Akhmetov and Serhiy Lyovochkin.

== Academic work ==
Lyovochkin is the founder of the New Ukraine Institute of Strategic Research. At this time, the institute is focusing on such areas as reforms in Ukraine, environmental and humanitarian issues, Minsk peace reestablishment process.

Lyovochkin has a Doctor degree in Economics (2004) and has authored 35 publications on economic issues.

He defended his thesis on the topics “National Debt of the United States of America" (1997) and “Macro-financial Stabilization in the Context of Economic Growth in Ukraine" (2004).

== See also ==
- Timeline of investigations into Trump and Russia (2017)
- Timeline of investigations into Trump and Russia (2019)

== Notes ==
Political offices
Preceded by Vira Ulyanchenko	Head of the Presidential Administration; 2010–2014	Succeeded by Andriy Klyuyev
