= Asia Universal Bank =

Kyrgyz bank

AsiaUniversalBank
- Company type: Joint Stock Company
- Industry: Banking
- Founded: 1997
- Headquarters: Bishkek, Kyrgyzstan
- Key people: Nurdin Abdrazakov, CEO Bob Dole, Director Bennett Johnston, Director Michael Mered (Russian: Майкл Меред), Director and former Kyrgyz IMF representative Michael Fox-Rabinovich, Lev Grozhonko, Robert Genkin, Evgeny Gurevich, (Note: Yevgeny Gurevich (Russian: Евгений Гуревич; born 1987 or 1988 Soviet Union) is a United States citizen since 1990 that lived in Long Island City, New York and had experience in investment banking and management consulting. He was the executive director of MGN Group CJSC, which was one of Kyrgyzstan's most powerful conglomerates and was formerly known as the financial and investment company Chronus Capital, the President of Virage Consulting Ltd. from 2001 to 2007, which is a US-based management consulting company, a director of Asia Universal Bank (AUB) from 2006 to 2009, a Senior Vice President of the Africa Investment Bank, and the personal financier of Maxim Bakiyev. MGN Group CJSC is believed to be named for Maksim, Gurevich, and Nadel, which is the last name of businessman Mikhail Nadel. In March 2010, he was accused of money laundering more than $2 billion for the 'Ndrangheta which were supporting the former Italian Senator Nicola Di Girolamo. To support the illegal scheme, Gurevich allegedly opened accounts for the firms Global Phone Network Srl and Planetarium Srl in Vienna with several Austrian banks including Raiffeisen Zentralbank, Bank Austria Creditanstalt, which is now known as UniCredit Bank Austria, and Anglo Irish Bank's Austrian branch located in Vienna. In 2011, Gurevich was sentenced in absentia to 15 years imprisonment in Kyrgyzstan for corruption. In 2018, charges against Gurevich were dropped by Kyrgyz Prosecutor General’s Office and his name was removed from Interpol's database.) Rustam Akzholov, Andrei Galitsky, Alexandra Katrin, Aleksey Eliseev
- Products: Financial services
- Website: www.aub.com www.aub.kg

Asia Universal Bank (AUB) was a Kyrgyz commercial bank, which held about a quarter of the combined assets and deposits reported by the entire Kyrgyz banking system. The bank was highly regarded internationally, and received a number of awards, from organizations such as The Banker, Global Finance, The Asian Banker and Euromoney, but subsequently fell from grace.

== Operations ==
Originally focused on corporate banking, AUB had actively expanded into retail banking and was the fastest growing mortgage provider in the country. At the time of its existence AUB was the only company in the country to have received an international credit rating. However, following the fall of the Bakiyev regime the bank was nationalised following a wide scale money laundering scandal.

AUB operated 90 branches in the Kyrgyz Republic and had representative offices in Riga, Latvia, which opened in 2002, Kyiv, Ukraine and Almaty, Kazakhstan.

== History ==
On 22 August 1997, the International Business Bank was established with a branch in Kyrgyzstan which became the AsiaUniversalBank (AUB) in 2000.

For $150,000 in 1999, Mikhael Nadel (Russian: Михаэль Надель), (Note: Mikhail Nadel (Russian: Михаил Надель; born 1968 or 1969), also known as Michael Strogonov, was sentenced to a total of 30 years in prison in Kyrgyzstan for fraud and money laundering and was convicted in absentia and was sentenced to 16 years imprisonment for fraud and money laundering at AsiaUniversalBank (AUB). In May 2018, he described himself as a Russian based in Italy during his filings in the United Kingdom with the Financial Conduct Authority for his firm Dzing Finance Ltd. Iveta Kerpe, who is the chief financial officer (CFO) of EMI Dzing since spring 2020, was involved in the 2014 $1 billion money laundering scheme involving the Ukraine based PrivatBank's Latvian branch and Moldova. Vitaly Orlov's (Russian: Виталий Орлов) former wife is the main shareholder of Dzing. Vitaly Orlov owns the Karat group (Russian: группа «Карат»).) a Russian businessman, purchased from a Western Samoan bank known as the International Business Bank its Kyrgyz subsidiary and renamed it Asia Universal Bank in 2000. Prior to beginning his operations in Kyrgyzstan, Nadal had similar operations in independent Ukraine.

Through accounts at AUB, very large sums were allegedly money laundered in a scheme involving Maxim Bakiyev, son of the former Kyrgyzstan president Kurmanbek Bakiyev, while the younger Bakiyev was chairman of the board of directors at the Kyrgyz Development Fund.

In 2006, Central Bank of Russia declared AsiaUniversalBank as undesirable.

According the Party of Regions' accounting book (Ukrainian: "амбарну книга"), Paul Manafort, who after the Orange Revolution provided strong support to Viktor Yanukovych, received funds in his Wachovia bank account in Virginia from the Party of Regions via the Belize based Neocom Systems Limited's AUB account on 14 October 2009. On 30 July 2014, Manafort was questioned by the FBI about his Wachovia bank account and his relationship with Neocom Systems which he stated that he had never heard of Neocom.

After the 2010 Kyrgyz Revolution, AUB was declared insolvent in October 2010, nationalized, and broken up. (Note: In February 2009, Kurmanbek Bakiyev with support from Konstantin Kilimnik and Paul Manafort decided to close the United States airbase at Manas.)

In April 2011, Mikhail Nadel was found guilty of numerous crimes including money laundering in absentia by a Kyrgyz court.
