= Zinaida Kubar =

Ukrainian artist and fashion designer (born 1975)

- Зінаїда Кубар
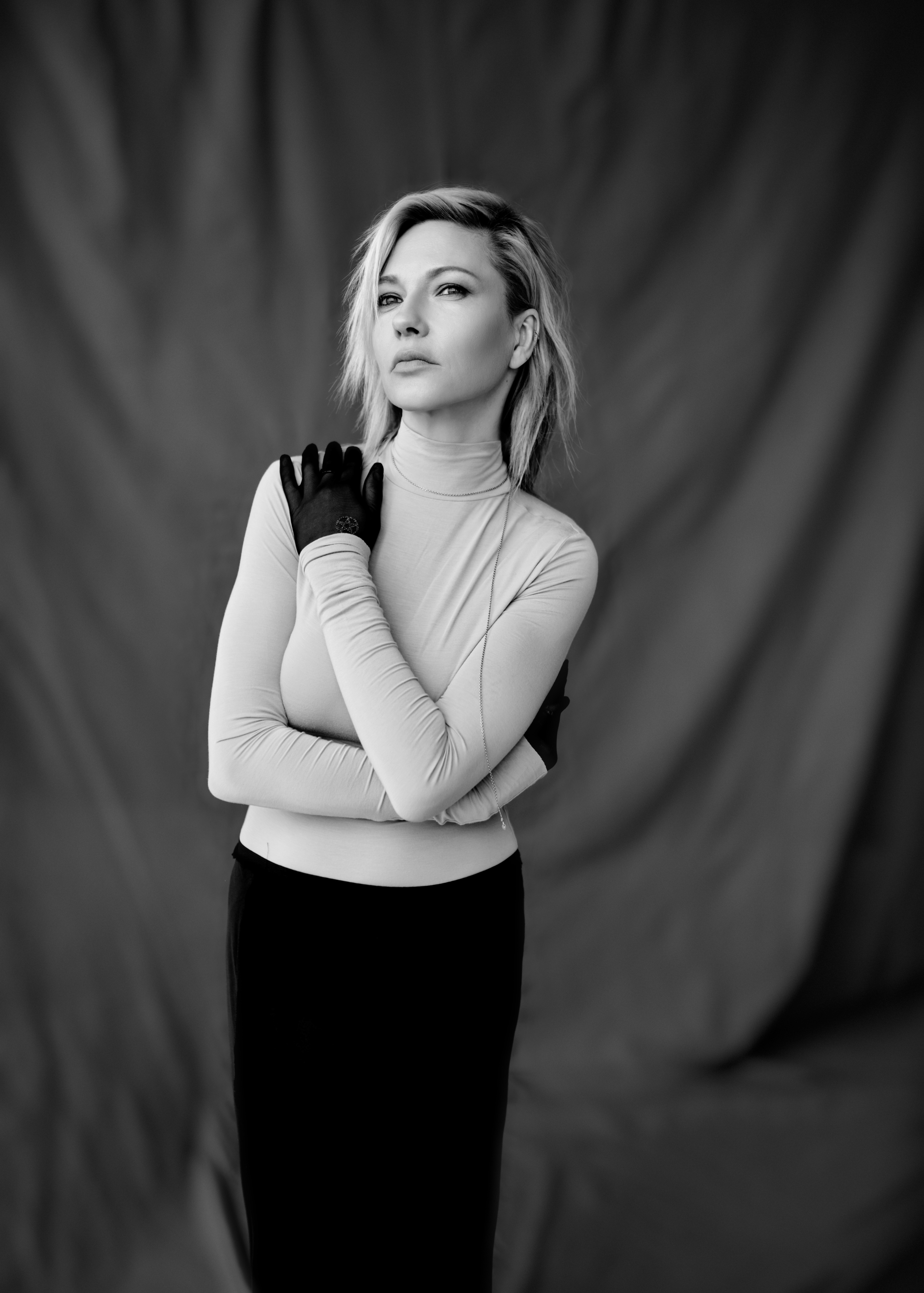
- Zinaida in 2019
- Born: 24 July 1975 (age 51); Kyiv, Ukrainian SSR, Soviet Union
- Education: Taras Shevchenko National University of Kyiv (BA); National Academy of Visual Arts and Architecture (BA)
- Occupations: Artist and fashion designer
- Spouse: Serhiy Lyovochkin
- Website: zinaida.art

Zinaida Oleksandrivna Kubar (Ukrainian: Зінаїда Олександрівна Кубар; born 24 July 1975) is a Ukrainian artist and fashion designer who is renowned for her diverse philosophical works, which include films, installations, performances, paintings, and ornaments. In her works, she explores sensory experiences to analyze themes related to creativity and contemporary folk life in the context of the 21st century.

== Early life and education ==
On 24 July 1975, Zinaida was born in Kyiv. In 1980, she studied under V. Levchyshyna at the Kyiv Art Studio and studied painting with O. Prakhova. She earned degrees in psychology and arts history from Taras Shevchenko National University of Kyiv in 2009, and the National Academy of Fine Arts and Architecture in 2017, respectively. The Food of War counts her among its members. She worked at Marina Abramović — In Residence (Kaldor Public Art Projects) in 2015 as a project facilitator. The National Union of Artists of Ukraine and the Con Artist Residence from 2018 to 2019, in New York, are two organizations she belongs to.

== Artistry ==
Zinaida explores themes such as feminine identity, societal norms, and the blending of tradition with modernity in her art, spanning various mediums including visual art, film, theater, dance, music, fashion, and NFTs. Her work, which includes over 300 artworks and 50 videos, focuses on mythology and imagery related to women's concerns, offering a unique perspective on cultural narratives and the human experience.

== Works ==
Zinaida has participated in three major exhibitions: Dakini at the 58th Venice Biennale, Black Bride projects at the 56th Venice Biennale, and solo shows at PinchukArtCentre (2015) in Kyiv. She took part in the Gogolfest Multimedia Festival, the Art Kyiv Contemporary International Forum of Contemporary Art, and the Art Lima Contemporary Art Fair (Lima, Peru).

Presenting at the First Kyiv International Biennale of Contemporary Art ARSENALE 2012, the artist's video installation "Transformation" is a seminal piece that has garnered positive reviews from both art critics and audiences. Together with Ukrposhta and UFW (Ukrainian Fashion Week), she unveiled postal stamps titled "Transformation" in 2017. Her "Rushnyk Canvases" exhibition opened on 28 June 2022 at the Saint Sophia Cathedral.

Zinaida met several women and young girls at the protest camps during the 2014 Maidan Revolution, and their photographs make up her body of work "Mute". After the revolution, She staged a video portrait shoot in a studio, capturing the moment with her subjects composed and at ease among the turmoil of the demonstration in the background. The work explores the strength of women, whom she sees as the nation's future. When Russia invaded Crimea in 2014, Zinaida was on a site inspection in Venice and was unable to go back home due to suspended flights.

Zinaida has been taking part in international contemporary art shows since 2011:

- Kyiv Contemporary Art (2011) with the installation Наши бабы. 7+2 (Our Women. 7+2).
- International Contemporary Art Week "Space Odyssey" (2011) with the installation Cosmic Egg.
- Art Kyiv Contemporary (2013) with the installation In&Out.
- New York Pulse (2014) from the video Осінь така мила (Autumn is So Cute).

Five of her movies were played at an installation at the College of Visual & Performing Arts (CVPA) Campus Gallery in 2024. Among these is "Flow," a 2016 piece that has the artist herself with all the star power of a young Deborah Harry, lasting nine and a half minutes. "Red Piano," the longest film in the collection, lasts for 50 minutes. A brief 2019 film titled "Wedding Crown" was displayed on the wall below waist level. The exhibition's centerpiece is the 17 and a half-minute movie "Dakini ll." The show gets its name from the last video, "Transformation."

== Philanthropy ==
Zinaida established the ArtRehub volunteer initiative in 2017 using her personal artistic experiences as inspiration. It was first created for kids with autism spectrum conditions. The method is predicated on the use of traditional craft traditions, individual artistic expression, and Ukrainian cultural icons. The emphasis of the art and rehabilitation programs has been on providing psychological support to individuals in challenging situations that have gotten worse due to the conflict. Zinaida believes that contemporary artists have a responsibility to be socially conscious, a belief reinforced by the Russian invasion of Ukraine in 2014, which prompted her to establish the program in response to an urgent need.

Zinaida organized several artistic journeys to remote areas of Ukraine, where she gathered, preserved, and processed artifacts related to the country's cultural legacy. The artist has been giving the people of the Chernobyl exclusion zone philanthropic support for the past six years.

== Personal life ==
Zinaida resides and works in Kyiv, Ukraine. She is married to Serhiy Lyovochkin, a Ukrainian politician and oligarch. Elena, the couple's 6-year-old daughter, was baptised by Leonid Kuchma.
