= Paul Manafort =

American political consultant (born 1949)

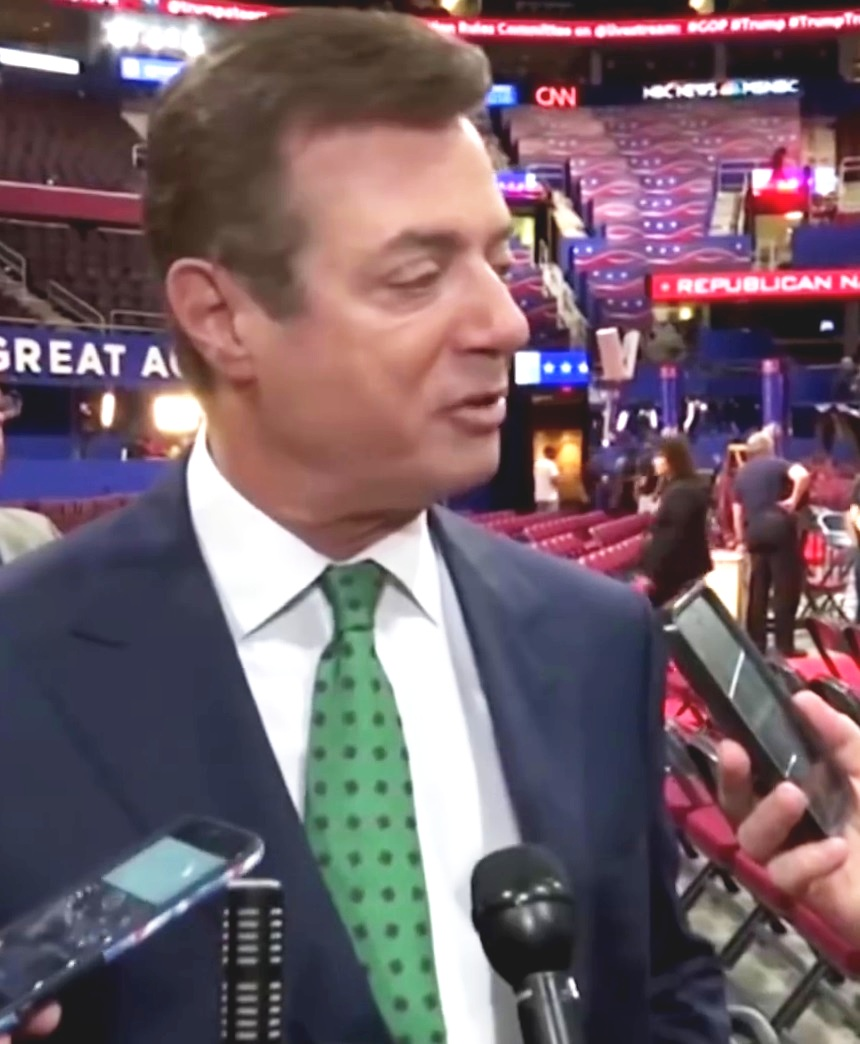
- Manafort at the 2016 Republican National Convention
- Born: Paul John Manafort Jr. April 1, 1949 (age 77); New Britain, Connecticut, U.S.
- Education: Georgetown University (BS, JD)
- Political party: Republican
- Spouse: Kathleen Bond (m. 1978)
- Children: 2
- Criminal information
- Status: Pardoned
- Convictions: Conspiracy against the United States, conspiracy to obstruct justice
- Penalty: 7 1/2 years in prison

Paul John Manafort Jr. (/ˈmænəfɔːrt/; born April 1, 1949) is an American former lobbyist, political consultant, and attorney. A long-time Republican Party campaign consultant, he chaired the Trump presidential campaign from June to August 2016. Manafort served as an adviser to the U.S. presidential campaigns of Republicans Gerald Ford, Ronald Reagan, George H. W. Bush, and Bob Dole. In 1980, he co-founded the Washington, D.C.-based lobbying firm Black, Manafort & Stone, along with principals Charles R. Black Jr. and Roger Stone, joined by Peter G. Kelly in 1984. Manafort often lobbied on behalf of foreign leaders, including former President of Ukraine Viktor Yanukovych, former dictator of the Philippines Ferdinand Marcos, former dictator of Zaire Mobutu Sese Seko, and Angolan guerrilla leader Jonas Savimbi. Lobbying to serve the interests of foreign governments requires registration with the United States Department of Justice under the Foreign Agents Registration Act (FARA); on June 27, 2017, he retroactively registered as a foreign agent.

On October 27, 2017, Manafort and his business associate Rick Gates were indicted in the United States District Court for the District of Columbia on multiple charges arising from their consulting work for the pro-Russian government President of Ukraine, Viktor Yanukovych, before Yanukovych was overthrown during the Revolution of Dignity in February 2014. The indictment came at the request of Robert Mueller's Special Counsel investigation. In June 2018, additional charges were filed against Manafort for obstruction of justice and witness tampering that are alleged to have occurred while he was under house arrest, and he was ordered to jail. Manafort was prosecuted in two federal courts. In August 2018, he stood trial in the United States District Court for the Eastern District of Virginia and was convicted on eight charges of tax and bank fraud. Manafort was next prosecuted on ten other charges, but this effort ended in a mistrial with Manafort later admitting his guilt. In the United States District Court for the District of Columbia, Manafort pled guilty to two charges of conspiracy to defraud the United States and witness tampering, while agreeing to cooperate with prosecutors. On November 26, 2018, Mueller reported that Manafort violated his plea deal by repeatedly lying to investigators. On February 13, 2019, D.C. District Court Judge Amy Berman Jackson concurred, voiding the plea deal. On March 7, 2019, Judge T. S. Ellis III sentenced Manafort to 47 months in prison. On March 13, 2019, Jackson sentenced Manafort to an additional 43 months in prison. Minutes after his sentencing, New York state prosecutors charged Manafort with sixteen state felonies. On December 18, 2019, the state charges against him were dismissed because of the doctrine of double jeopardy. In August 2020, the United States Senate Select Committee on Intelligence concluded in August 2020 that Manafort's ties to individuals connected to Russian intelligence while he was Trump's campaign manager "represented a grave counterintelligence threat" by creating opportunities for "Russian intelligence services to exert influence over, and acquire confidential information on, the Trump campaign." On May 13, 2020, Manafort was released to home confinement due to the threat of getting infected with COVID-19. On December 23, 2020, then-U.S. President Donald Trump pardoned Manafort.

In mid-March 2024, Manafort reemerged on the political scene, with reports suggesting that he intended to participate in Donald Trump's 2024 presidential campaign. Following Trump's victory at the 2024 United States presidential election, Manafort reportedly cooperated with several individuals from Trump's inner circle (including Tony Fabrizio and Chris LaCivita), as they worked as consultants to the electoral campaign of the former President and Prime Minister of Albania, Sali Berisha's political party, Alliance for a Magnificent Albania, in the 2025 Albanian parliamentary election.

== Early life and education ==
Paul John Manafort Jr. was born on April 1, 1949, in New Britain, Connecticut. Manafort's parents are Antoinette Mary Manafort (born Cifalu; 1921–2003) and Paul John Manafort Sr. (1923–2013). His grandfather immigrated to the United States from Italy in the early 20th century, settling in Connecticut. He founded the construction company New Britain House Wrecking Company in 1919 (later renamed Manafort Brothers Inc.). His father served in the U.S. Army combat engineers during World War II and served as mayor of New Britain from 1965 to 1971. His father was indicted in a corruption scandal in 1981 but was not convicted.

In 1967, Manafort graduated from St. Thomas Aquinas High School, a private Roman Catholic secondary school, in New Britain. He attended Georgetown University, where he received his B.S. in business administration in 1971 and his J.D. in 1974.

== Career ==
Between 1977 and 1980, Manafort practiced law with the firm of Vorys, Sater, Seymour and Pease in Washington, D.C.

=== Political activities ===
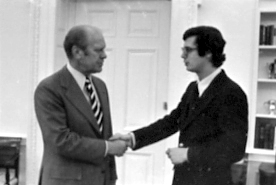
Manafort greeting President Gerald Ford, 1976

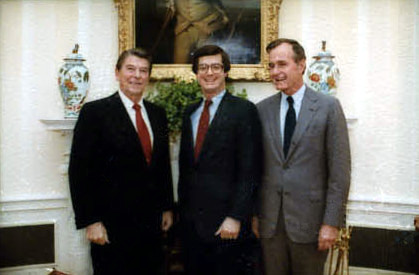
Manafort with President Ronald Reagan and Vice President George H. W. Bush, 1982

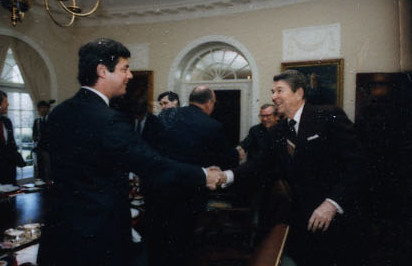
Manafort greeting President Ronald Reagan, 1987

In 1976, Manafort served as the delegate-hunt coordinator for eight states for the President Ford Committee; the overall Ford delegate operation was run by James Baker. Between 1978 and 1980, Manafort served as the southern coordinator for Ronald Reagan's presidential campaign and the deputy political director at the Republican National Committee. After Reagan's election in November 1980, he was appointed associate director of the White House Presidential Personnel Office. In 1981, he was nominated to the board of directors of the Overseas Private Investment Corporation.

Manafort was an adviser to the presidential campaigns of George H. W. Bush in 1988 and Bob Dole in 1996.

==== Chairman of Trump's 2016 campaign ====
In February 2016, Manafort approached Trump through a mutual friend, Tom Barrack. He pointed out his experience advising presidential campaigns in the United States and around the world, described himself as an outsider not connected to the Washington establishment, and offered to work without salary. In March 2016, he joined Trump's presidential campaign to take the lead in getting commitments from convention delegates. On June 20, 2016, Trump fired campaign manager Corey Lewandowski and promoted Manafort to the position. Manafort gained control of the daily operations of the campaign as well as an expanded $20 million budget, hiring decisions, advertising, and media strategy.

On June 9, 2016, Manafort, Donald Trump Jr., and Jared Kushner were participants in a meeting with Russian attorney Natalia Veselnitskaya and several others at Trump Tower. A British music agent, saying he was acting on behalf of Emin Agalarov and the Russian government, had told Trump Jr. that he could obtain damaging information on Hillary Clinton if he met with a lawyer connected to the Kremlin. At first, Trump Jr. said the meeting had been primarily about the Russian ban on international adoptions (in response to the Magnitsky Act) and mentioned nothing about Mrs. Clinton; he later said the offer of information about Clinton had been a pretext to conceal Veselnitskaya's real agenda.

In August 2016, Manafort's connections to former Ukrainian President Viktor Yanukovych and his pro-Russian Party of Regions drew national attention in the US, where it was reported that Manafort may have received $12.7 million (~$16.7 million in 2025) in off-the-books funds from the Party of Regions.

On August 17, 2016, Trump received his first security briefing. On the same day, August 17, Trump shook up his campaign organization in a way that appeared to minimize Manafort's role. It was reported that members of Trump's family, particularly Kushner, who had originally been a strong backer of Manafort, had become uneasy about his Russian connections and suspected that he had not been forthright about them.

Manafort stated in an internal staff memorandum that he would "remain the campaign chairman and chief strategist, providing the big-picture, long-range campaign vision." However, two days later, Trump announced his acceptance of Manafort's resignation from the campaign after Steve Bannon and Kellyanne Conway took on senior leadership roles within that campaign.

Upon Manafort's resignation as campaign chairman, Newt Gingrich stated, "nobody should underestimate how much Paul Manafort did to really help get this campaign to where it is right now." Gingrich later added that, for the Trump administration, "It makes perfect sense for them to distance themselves from somebody who apparently didn't tell them what he was doing."

In January 2019, Manafort's lawyers submitted a filing to the court in response to the allegation that Manafort had lied to investigators. Through an error in redacting, the document accidentally revealed that while he was campaign chairman, Manafort met with Konstantin Kilimnik, a likely Russian intelligence officer and an alleged operative of the "Mariupol Plan," which would separate eastern Ukraine by political means with Manafort's assistance. The filing stated that Manafort gave him polling data related to the 2016 campaign and discussed a Ukrainian peace plan with him.

Most of the polling data was reportedly public, although some was private Trump campaign polling data. Manafort asked Kilimnik to pass the data to Ukrainian nationals Serhiy Lyovochkin and Rinat Akhmetov, both of whom held senior positions in the pro-Russian Ukrainian political parties Opposition Block and Party of Regions. The Republican-controlled Senate Intelligence Committee concluded in August 2020 that Manafort's contacts with Kilimnik and other affiliates of Russian intelligence "represented a grave counterintelligence threat" because his "presence on the Campaign and proximity to Trump created opportunities for Russian intelligence services to exert influence over, and acquire confidential information on, the Trump campaign."

During a February 4, 2019, closed-door court hearing regarding false statements Manafort had made to investigators about his communications with Kilimnik, special counsel prosecutor Andrew Weissmann told judge Amy Berman Jackson that "This goes, I think, very much to the heart of what the special counsel's office is investigating," suggesting that Mueller's office continued to examine a possible agreement between Russia and the Trump campaign.

While Manafort served within the 2016 United States presidential election campaign, it is alleged that Manafort, via Kyiv-based operative Konstantin Kilimnik, offered to provide briefings on political developments to Oleg Deripaska. Behaviors such as these were seen by writers at The Atlantic as an attempt by Manafort "to please an oligarch tied to" Putin's government.

=== Lobbying career ===
In 1980, Manafort was the founding partner of Washington, D.C.-based lobbying firm Black, Manafort & Stone, alongside principals Charles R. Black Jr. and Roger Stone. After Peter G. Kelly was recruited, the name of the firm was changed to Black, Manafort, Stone and Kelly (BMSK) in 1984.

Manafort left BMSK (then a subsidiary of Burson-Marsteller) in 1995 to join Rick Davis and Matthew C. Freedman in forming Davis, Manafort, and Freedman.

==== Association with Jonas Savimbi ====
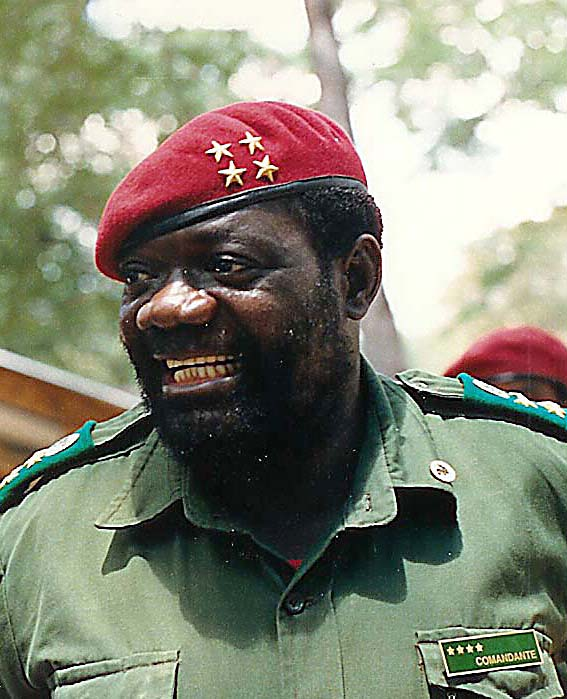
Manafort has represented Angolan rebel leader Jonas Savimbi.

In 1985, Manafort's firm, BMSK, signed a $600,000 (~$1.52 million in 2025) contract with Jonas Savimbi, the leader of the Angolan rebel group UNITA, to refurbish Savimbi's image in Washington and secure financial support on the basis of his anti-communism stance. BMSK arranged for Savimbi to attend events at the American Enterprise Institute (where Jeane Kirkpatrick gave him a laudatory introduction), The Heritage Foundation, and Freedom House; in the wake of the campaign, Congress approved hundreds of millions of dollars in covert American aid to Savimbi's group. Allegedly, Manafort's continuing lobbying efforts helped preserve the flow of money to Savimbi several years after the Soviet Union ceased its involvement in the Angolan conflict, forestalling peace talks.

==== Lobbying for other foreign leaders ====
Between June 1984 and June 1986, Manafort was a FARA-registered lobbyist for Saudi Arabia. The Reagan Administration refused to grant Manafort a waiver from federal statutes prohibiting public officials from acting as foreign agents; Manafort resigned his directorship at OPIC in May 1986. An investigation by the Department of Justice found 18 lobbying-related activities that were not reported in FARA filings, including lobbying on behalf of The Bahamas and Saint Lucia.

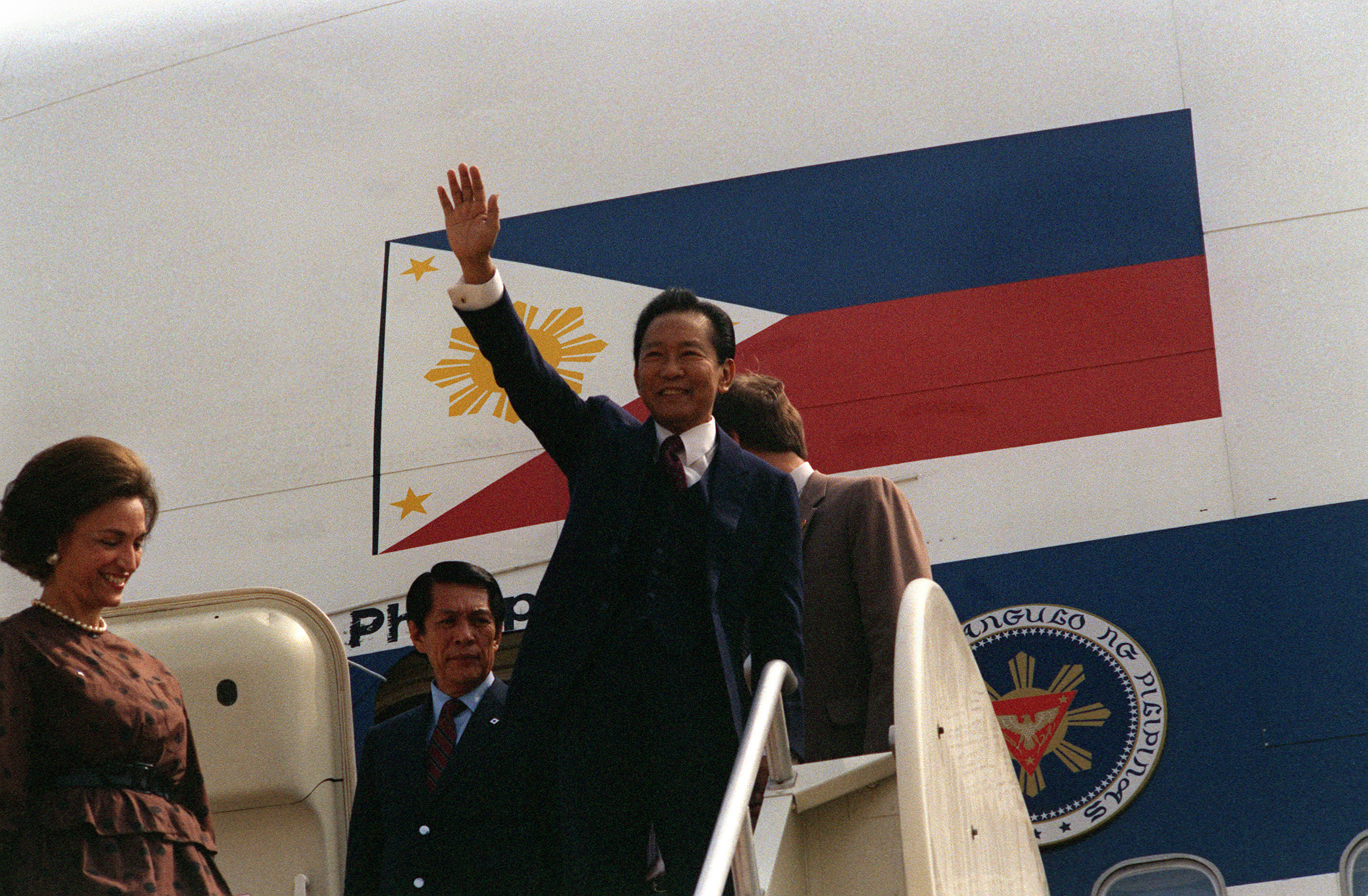
Manafort served as a lobbyist for Ferdinand Marcos, the former President of the Philippines.

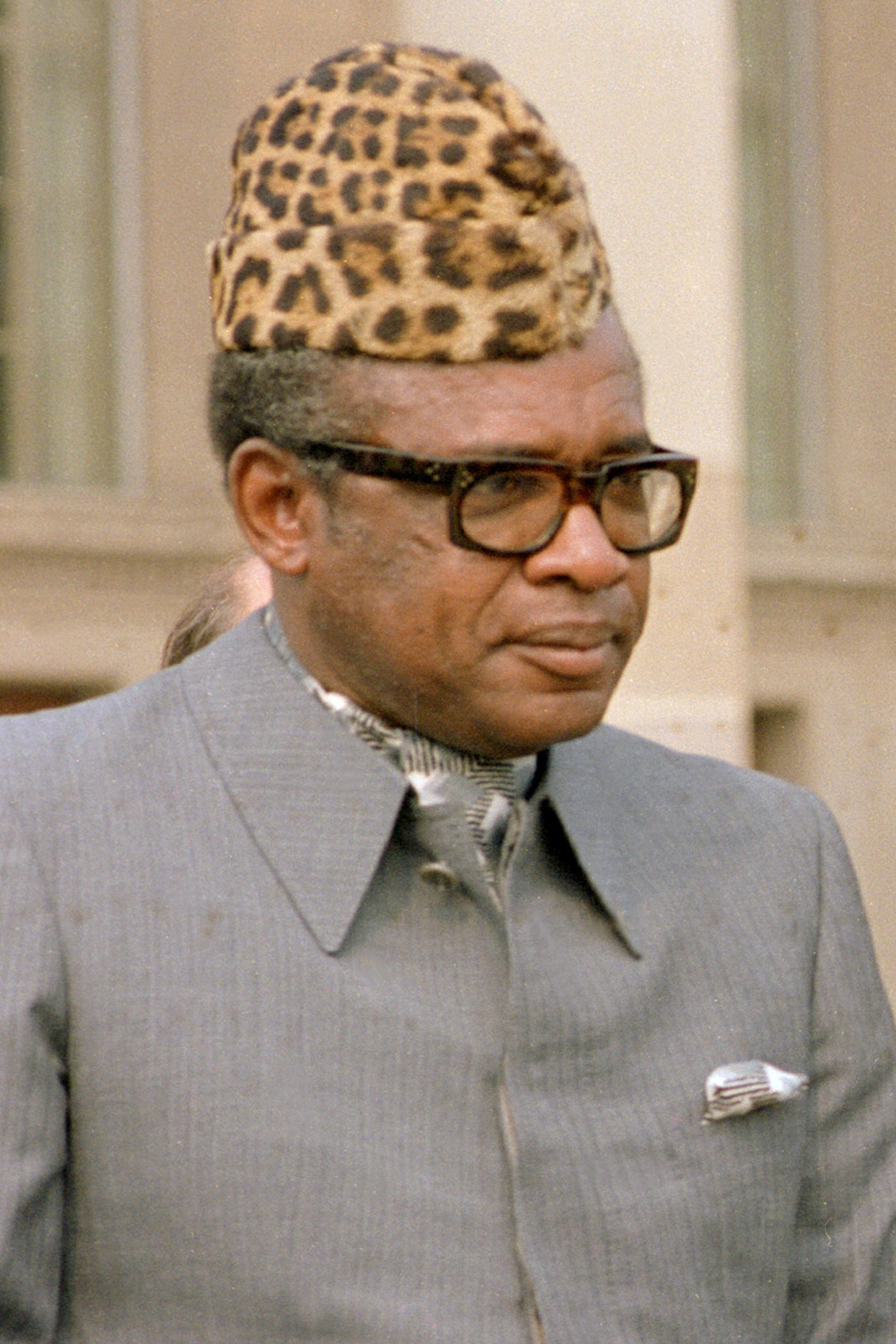
Manafort lobbied on behalf of former Zairean President Mobutu Sese Seko.

Manafort's firm, BMSK, accepted $950,000 yearly to lobby for Ferdinand Marcos, the then-president of the Philippines. Additionally, he was involved in lobbying for Mobutu Sese Seko, the authoritarian President of the Republic of Zaïre (predecessor of today's Democratic Republic of the Congo), securing a US$1 million (~$2.26 million in 2025) annual contract in 1989, while he also attempted to recruit the Somali strongman, Siad Barre, as a client.

His firm lobbied on behalf of the governments of the Dominican Republic, Equatorial Guinea, Kenya, earning between $660,000 and $750,000 each year between 1991 and 1993, and Nigeria, earning $1 million in 1991. These activities resulted in Manafort's firm being listed amongst the top five lobbying firms receiving money from human-rights-abusing regimes in the Center for Public Integrity report "The Torturers' Lobby".

The New York Times reported that Manafort accepted payment from the Kurdistan Region to facilitate Western recognition of the 2017 Kurdistan Region independence referendum.

==== Involvement in the Karachi affair ====
Manafort wrote the campaign strategy for Édouard Balladur in the 1995 French elections and was paid indirectly. The money, at least $200,000, was transferred to him through his friend, Lebanese arms dealer Abdul Rahman al-Assir, from middlemen fees paid for arranging the sale of three French Agosta-class submarines to Pakistan, in a scandal known as the Karachi affair.

==== Association with the Pakistani Inter-Service Intelligence Agency ====
Manafort received $700,000 from the Kashmiri American Council between 1990 and 1994, supposedly to promote the plight of the Kashmiri people. However, an FBI investigation revealed the money was actually from Pakistan's Inter-Services Intelligence (ISI) agency as part of a disinformation operation to divert attention from terrorism. A former Pakistani ISI official claimed Manafort was aware of the nature of the operation. While producing a documentary as part of the deal, Manafort interviewed several Indian officials while pretending to be a CNN reporter.

==== HUD scandal ====
In the late 1980s, Manafort was criticized for using his connections at HUD to ensure funding for a $43 million rehabilitation of dilapidated housing in Seabrook, New Jersey. Manafort's firm received a $326,000 fee for its work in getting HUD approval of the grant, largely through personal influence with Deborah Gore Dean, an executive assistant to former HUD Secretary Samuel Pierce.

==== Transition to Ukraine ====
Manafort's involvement in Ukraine can be traced to 2003, when Russian oligarch Oleg Deripaska hired Dole, Manafort's prior campaign candidate, to lobby the United States Department of State for a waiver of his visa ban, primarily so that he could solicit otherwise unavailable institutional purchasers for shares in his company, RusAL. Then, in early 2004, Deripaska met with Manafort's partner, Rick Davis, also a prior campaign adviser to Bob Dole, to discuss hiring Manafort and Davis to return the former Georgian Minister of State Security, Igor Giorgadze, to prominence in Georgian politics.

By December 2004, however, Deripaska shelved his plans in Georgia and dispatched Manafort to meet with Akhmetov in Ukraine to help Akhmetov and his holding firm, System Capital Management, weather the political crisis brought by the Orange Revolution. Akhmetov would eventually flee to Monaco after being accused of murder, but during the crisis, Manafort shepherded Akhmetov around Washington, meeting with U.S. officials like Dick Cheney. Akhmetov introduced Manafort to Yanukovych, to whose political party, the Party of Regions, Akhmetov was a contributor.

==== Lobbying for Viktor Yanukovych and involvement in Ukraine ====
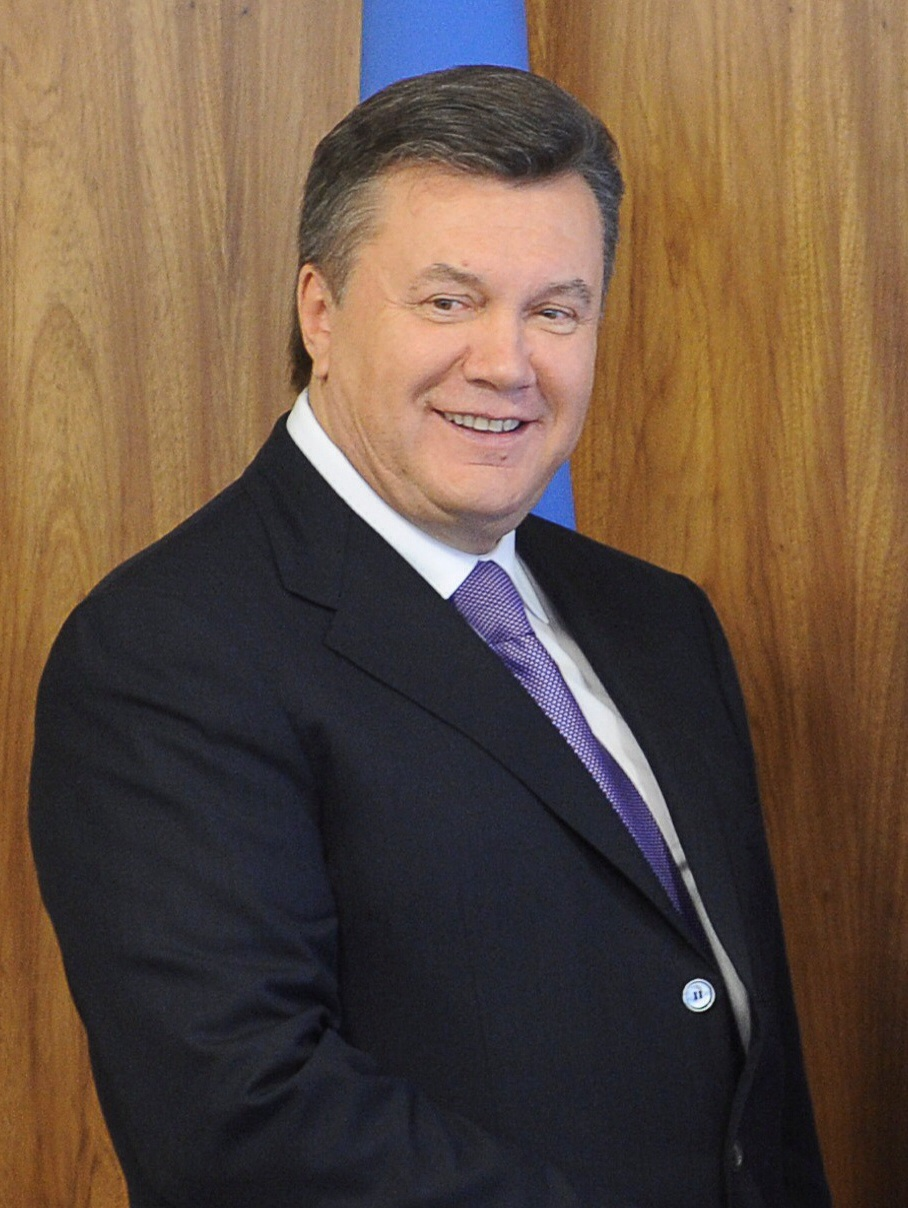
Pro-Russia Ukrainian President Viktor Yanukovych, for whom Manafort lobbied

Manafort worked as an adviser on the Ukrainian presidential campaign of Yanukovych (and his Party of Regions during the same time span) from December 2004 until the February 2010 Ukrainian presidential election, even as the U.S. government (and U.S. Senator John McCain) opposed Yanukovych because of his ties to Russia's leader Vladimir Putin. Manafort was hired to advise Yanukovych months after massive street demonstrations known as the Orange Revolution overturned Yanukovych's rigged victory in the 2004 presidential race.

Borys Kolesnikov, Yanukovych's campaign manager, said the party hired Manafort after identifying organizational and other problems in the 2004 elections, in which it was advised by Russian strategists. Manafort rebuffed U.S. Ambassador William B. Taylor Jr. when the latter complained he was undermining U.S. interests in Ukraine. According to a 2008 U.S. Justice Department annual report, Manafort's company received $63,750 from Yanukovych's Party of Regions over six months ending on March 31, 2008, for consulting services.

In the 2010 election, Yanukovych managed to pull off a narrow win over Prime Minister Yulia Tymoshenko, a leader of the 2004 demonstrations. Yanukovych owed his comeback in Ukraine's presidential election to a drastic makeover of his political persona, and—people in his party say—that makeover was engineered in part by his American consultant, Manafort.

In 2007 and 2008, Manafort was involved in investment projects with Deripaska—the acquisition of a Ukrainian telecommunications company—and Ukrainian oligarch Dmytro Firtash—redevelopment of the site of the former Drake Hotel in New York City). Manafort negotiated a $10 million (~$15.8 million in 2025) annual contract with Deripaska to promote Russian interests in politics, business, and media coverage in Europe and the United States, starting in 2005. A witness at Manafort's 2018 trial for fraud and tax evasion testified that Deripaska loaned Manafort $10 million in 2010, which, to her knowledge, was never repaid.

At Manafort's trial, federal prosecutors alleged that between 2010 and 2014, he was paid more than $60 million by Ukrainian sponsors, including Akhmetov, believed to be the richest man in Ukraine.

In May 2011, Yanukovych stated that he would strive for Ukraine to join the European Union. In 2013, Yanukovych became the main target of the Euromaidan protests. After the February 2014 Ukrainian revolution (the conclusion of Euromaidan), Yanukovych fled to Russia. On March 17, 2014, the day after the Crimean status referendum, Yanukovych became one of the first eleven persons who were placed under executive sanctions on the Specially Designated Nationals List (SDN) by President Barack Obama, freezing his assets in the US and banning him from entering the United States. (Note: The individuals on the first list of United States sanctions for individuals or entities involved in the Ukraine crisis are Sergey Aksyonov, Sergey Glazyev, Andrei Klishas, Vladimir Konstantinov, Valentina Matviyenko, Victor Medvedchuk, Yelena Mizulina, Dmitry Rogozin, Leonid Slutsky, Vladislav Surkov, and Viktor Yanukovych.)

Manafort then returned to Ukraine in September 2014 to become an adviser to Yanukovych's former head of the Presidential Administration of Ukraine Serhiy Lyovochkin. In this role, he was asked to assist in rebranding Yanukovych's Party of Regions. Instead, he argued to help stabilize Ukraine. Manafort was instrumental in creating a new political party called Opposition Bloc. According to Ukrainian political analyst Mikhail Pogrebinsky, "He thought to gather the largest number of people opposed to the current government, you needed to avoid anything concrete, and just become a symbol of being opposed". According to Manafort, he has not worked in Ukraine since the October 2014 Ukrainian parliamentary election. However, according to Ukrainian border control entry data, Manafort traveled to Ukraine several times after that election, all the way through late 2015. According to The New York Times, his local office in Ukraine closed in May 2016. According to Politico, by then Opposition Bloc had already stopped payments for Manafort and this local office.

In an April 2016 interview with ABC News, Manafort stated that the aim of his activities in Ukraine had been to lead the country "closer to Europe".

Ukrainian government National Anti-Corruption Bureau studying secret documents claimed in August 2016 to have found handwritten records that show $12.7 million in cash payments designated for Manafort, although they had yet to determine if he had received the money. These undisclosed payments were from the pro-Russian political party Party of Regions, of the former president of Ukraine, Yanukovych. This payment record spans from 2007 to 2012. Manafort's lawyer, Richard A. Hibey, said Manafort didn't receive "any such cash payments" as described by the anti-corruption officials. The Associated Press reported on August 17, 2016, that Manafort secretly routed at least $2.2 million in payments to two prominent Washington lobbying firms in 2012 on behalf of the Party of Regions, and did so in a way that effectively obscured the foreign political party's efforts to influence U.S. policy. Associated Press noted that under federal law, U.S. lobbyists must declare publicly if they represent foreign leaders or their political parties and provide detailed reports about their actions to the Justice Department, which Manafort reportedly did not do. The lobbying firms unsuccessfully lobbied the United States Congress to reject a resolution condemning the jailing of Yanukovych's main political rival, Yulia Tymoshenko.

Financial records certified in December 2015 and filed by Manafort in Cyprus showed him to be approximately $17 million (~$22.5 million in 2025) in debt to interests connected to interests favorable to Putin and Yanukovych in the months before joining the Trump presidential campaign in March. These included a $7.8 million debt to Oguster Management Limited, a company connected to Deripaska. This accords with a 2015 court complaint filed by Deripaska claiming that Manafort and his partners owed him $19 million in relation to a failed Ukrainian cable television business. In January 2018, Surf Horizon Limited, a Cyprus-based company tied to Deripaska, sued Manafort and his business partner Richard "Rick" Gates, accusing them of financial fraud by misappropriating more than $18.9 million that the company had invested in Ukrainian telecom companies, known collectively as the "Black Sea Cable". An additional $9.9 million debt was owed to a Cyprus company that was tied through shell companies to Ivan Fursin, a Ukrainian Member of Parliament of the Party of Regions. Manafort spokesman Jason Maloni maintained in response, "Manafort is not indebted to Deripaska or the Party of Regions, nor was he at the time he began working for the Trump campaign." During the 2016 Presidential campaign, Manafort, via Kilimnik, offered to provide briefings on political developments to Deripaska, though there is no evidence that the briefings took place. A July 2017 application by the FBI for a search warrant revealed that a company controlled by Manafort and his wife had received a $10 million (~$12.9 million in 2025) loan from Deripaska.

According to leaked text messages between his daughters, Manafort was also one of the proponents of violent removal of the Euromaidan protesters, which resulted in police shooting dozens of people during 2014 Hrushevskoho Street riots. In one of the messages, his daughter writes that it was his "strategy that was to cause that, to send those people out and get them slaughtered."

Manafort has rejected questions about whether Kilimnik, with whom he consulted regularly, might be in league with Russian intelligence. According to Yuri Shvets, Kilimnik previously worked for the GRU, and every bit of information about his work with Manafort went directly to Russian intelligence.

=== 2017 activities ===
==== Registering as a foreign agent ====
Lobbying for foreign countries requires registration with the Justice Department under the Foreign Agents Registration Act (FARA). Manafort did not do so at the time of his lobbying. In April 2017, a Manafort spokesman said Manafort was planning to file the required paperwork; however, according to Associated Press reporters, as of June 2, 2017, Manafort had not yet registered. On June 27, he filed to be retroactively registered as a foreign agent. Among other things, he disclosed that he made more than $17 million between 2012 and 2014 working for a pro-Russian political party in Ukraine. The sentencing memorandum submitted by the Office of Special Council on February 23, 2019, stated that the "filing was plainly deficient. Manafort entirely omitted [his] United States lobbying contracts ... and a portion of the substantial compensation Manafort received from Ukraine."

==== China, Puerto Rico, and Ecuador ====
Early in 2017, Manafort supported Chinese efforts at providing development and investment worldwide and in Puerto Rico and Ecuador. Early in 2017, he discussed possible Chinese investment sources for Ecuador with Lenín Moreno who later obtained loans worth several billion US dollars from the China Development Bank. In May 2017, Manafort and Moreno discussed the possibility of Manafort brokering a deal for Ecuador to relinquish Julian Assange to American authorities in exchange for concessions such as debt relief from the United States.

Manafort acted as the go between for the China Development Bank's investment fund to support bailout bonds for Puerto Rico's sovereign debt financing and other infrastructure items. Also, he advised a Shanghai construction billionaire Yan Jiehe (严介和), who owns the Pacific Construction Group (太平洋建设) and is China's seventh richest man with a fortune estimated at $14.2 billion in 2015, on obtaining international contracts.

==== Kurdish independence referendum ====
In mid-2017, Manafort left the United States in order to help organize the 2017 Kurdistan Region independence referendum that was to be held on September 25, 2017, something that surprised both investigators and the media. He was hired by the President of Kurdistan Region Masoud Barzani's son Masrour Barzani who heads the Kurdistan Region Security Council. To help Manafort's efforts in supporting Kurdish freedom and independence, his longtime associate Phillip M. Griffin traveled to Erbil prior to the vote. The referendum was not supported by United States Secretary of Defense James Mattis. Manafort returned to the United States just before both his indictment and the start of the 2017 Iraqi–Kurdish conflict in which the Peshmerga-led Kurds lost the Mosul Dam and their main revenue source at the Baba GurGur Kirkuk oilfields to Iraqi forces.

== Homes, home loans and other loans ==
Manafort's work in Ukraine coincided with the purchase of at least four prime pieces of real estate in the United States, worth a combined $11 million, between 2006 and early 2012. In 2006, Manafort purchased an apartment on the 43rd floor of Trump Tower for a reported $3.6 million (~$5.52 million in 2025). Manafort, however, purchased the unit indirectly, through an LLC named after him and his partner Rick Hannah Davis, "John Hannah, LLC". That LLC, according to court documents in Manafort's indictment, came into existence in April 2006, roughly one month after the Ukrainian parliamentary elections that saw Manafort help bring Yanukovych back to power on March 22, 2006. According to Afghan-Ukrainian journalist Mustafa Nayyem, Akhmetov, the Ukrainian oligarch sponsoring Yanukovych, paid the $3 million purchase price for Manafort's Trump Tower apartment for helping win the election. It was not until March 5, 2015, when Manafort's income from Ukraine dwindled, that Manafort would transfer the property out of John Hannah, LLC, and into his own personal name so that he could take out a $3 million loan against the property. The Trump Tower residence was claimed as Manafort's primary residence in order to receive a tax abatement, though Manafort also listed a Florida residence as his primary residence, also to gain tax breaks. The property was since seized by the federal government, and listed for sale in 2019.

Since 2012, Manafort has taken out seven home equity loans worth approximately $19.2 million (~$26.6 million in 2025) on three separate New York-area properties he owns through holding companies registered to him and his then son-in-law Jeffrey Yohai, a real estate investor. In 2016, Yohai declared Chapter 11 bankruptcy for LLCs tied to four residential properties held with the actor Jake Hoffman; Manafort holds a $2.7 million (~$3.54 million in 2025) claim on one of the properties.

As of February 2017, Manafort had about $12 million in home equity loans outstanding. For one home, loans of $6.6 million exceeded the value of that home; the loans are from the Federal Savings Bank of Chicago, Illinois, whose CEO, Stephen Calk, was a campaign supporter of Donald Trump and was a member of Trump's economic advisory council during the campaign. In July 2017, New York prosecutors subpoenaed information about the loans issued to Manafort during the 2016 presidential campaign. At the time, these loans represented about a quarter of the bank's equity capital.

The Mueller investigation is reviewing a number of loans that Manafort has received since leaving the Trump campaign in August 2016, specifically $7 million (~$9.19 million in 2025) from Oguster Management Limited, a British Virgin Islands-registered company connected to Deripaska, to another Manafort-linked company, Cyprus-registered LOAV Advisers Ltd. This entire amount was unsecured, carried interest at 2%, and had no repayment date. Additionally, NBC News found documents that reveal loans of more than $27 million from the two Cyprus entities to a third company connected to Manafort, a limited-liability corporation registered in Delaware. This company, Jesand LLC, bears a strong resemblance to the names of Manafort's daughters, Jessica and Andrea.

== Russia investigations ==
=== FBI and Special Counsel investigation ===
The FBI reportedly began a criminal investigation into Manafort in 2014, shortly after Yanukovych was deposed during Euromaidan. That investigation predated the 2016 election by several years and is ongoing. In addition, Manafort is also a person of interest in the FBI counterintelligence probe looking into the Russian government's interference in the 2016 presidential election.

On January 19, 2017, the eve of Trump's presidential inauguration, it was reported that Manafort was under active investigation by multiple federal agencies including the Central Intelligence Agency, National Security Agency, Federal Bureau of Investigation, Director of National Intelligence, and the financial crimes unit of the Treasury Department. Investigations were said to be based on intercepted Russian communications as well as financial transactions. CNN reported in September 2017 that Manafort was wiretapped by the FBI "before and after the election ... including a period when Manafort was known to talk to President Donald Trump." The surveillance of Manafort reportedly began in 2014, before Donald Trump announced his candidacy for President of United States. According to a subsequent CNN editor's note, however: "On December 9, 2019, the Justice Department Inspector General released a report regarding the opening of the investigation on Russian election interference and Donald Trump's campaign. In the report, the IG contradicts what CNN was told in 2017, noting that the FBI team overseeing the investigation did not seek FISA surveillance of Paul Manafort".

Special Counsel Robert Mueller, who was appointed on May 17, 2017, by the Justice Department to oversee the investigation into Russian interference in the 2016 United States elections and related matters, took over the existing criminal probe involving Manafort. On July 26, 2017, the day after Manafort's United States Senate Select Committee on Intelligence hearing and the morning of his planned hearing before the United States Senate Committee on the Judiciary, FBI agents at Mueller's direction conducted a raid on Manafort's Alexandria, Virginia home, using a search warrant to seize documents and other materials, in regard to the Russian meddling in the 2016 election. Initial press reports indicated Mueller obtained a no-knock warrant for this raid, though Mueller's office has disputed these reports in court documents. United States v. Paul Manafort was analyzed by attorney George T. Conway III, who wrote that it strengthened the constitutionality of the Mueller investigation.

Former Trump attorney John Dowd denied March 2018 reports by The New York Times and The Washington Post that in 2017 he had broached the idea of a presidential pardon for Manafort with his attorneys.

=== Congressional investigations ===
In May 2017, in response to a request of the Senate Select Committee on Intelligence (SSCI), Manafort submitted over "300 pages of documents ... included drafts of speeches, calendars and notes from his time on the campaign" to the Committee "related to its investigation of Russian election meddling." On July 25, he met privately with the committee.

A congressional hearing on Russia issues, including the Trump campaign-Russian meeting, was scheduled by the Senate Committee on the Judiciary for July 26, 2017. Manafort was scheduled to appear together with Trump Jr., while Kushner was to testify in a separate closed session. After separate negotiations, both Manafort and Trump Jr. met with the committee on July 26 in closed session and agreed to turn over requested documents. They are expected to testify in public eventually.

The United States Senate Select Committee on Intelligence concluded in its August 2020 final report that as Trump campaign manager "Manafort worked with Kilimnik starting in 2016 on narratives that sought to undermine evidence that Russia interfered in the 2016 U.S. election" and to direct such suspicions toward Ukraine. The report characterized Kilimnik as a "Russian intelligence officer" and said Manafort's activities represented a "grave counterintelligence threat." The investigation found:

Manafort's presence on the Campaign and proximity to Trump created opportunities for the Russian intelligence services to exert influence over, and acquire confidential information on, the Trump Campaign. The Committee assesses that Kilimnik likely served as a channel to Manafort for Russian intelligence services, and that those services likely sought to exploit Manafort's access to gain insight [into] the Campaign...On numerous occasions over the course of his time of the Trump Campaign, Manafort sought to secretly share internal campaign information with Kilimnik...Manafort briefed Kilimnik on sensitive campaign polling data and the campaign's strategy for beating Hillary Clinton.

The Committee did not definitively establish Kilimnik as a channel connected to the hacking and leaking of DNC emails, noting that its investigation was hampered by Manafort and Kilimnik's use of "sophisticated communications security practices" and Manafort's lies during SCO interviews on the topic. The report noted: "Manafort's obfuscation of the truth surrounding Kilimnik was particularly damaging to the Committee's investigation because it effectively foreclosed direct insight into a series of interactions and communications which represent the single most direct tie between senior Trump Campaign officials and the Russian intelligence services." In April 2021, a document released by the U.S. Treasury Department announcing new sanctions against Russia confirmed a direct pipeline from Manafort to Russian intelligence, noting: “During the 2016 U.S. presidential election campaign, Kilimnik provided the Russian Intelligence Services with sensitive information on polling and campaign strategy”.

The fifth and final volume of the August 2020 Senate Intelligence Committee report, in a section on Manafort, noted: "Manafort had direct access to Trump" as well as the Trump campaign's senior officials, strategies, and information," and "Manafort, often with the assistance of Gates, engaged with individuals inside Russia and Ukraine on matters pertaining both to his personal business prospects and the 2016 U.S. election." The report found that beginning around 2004, Manafort began to work for Deripaska and pro-Russian oligarchs in Ukraine, and that this involvement led to Manafort's involvement in the victory of Yanukovych in the 2010 Ukrainian elections. The committee report stated: "The Russian government coordinates with and directs Deripaska" as part of the influence operations that Manafort assisted with, and that "Manafort's influence work for Deripaska was, in effect, influence work for the Russian government and its interests."

=== Private investigation ===
The Trump–Russia dossier, also known as the Steele dossier, is a private intelligence report comprising investigation memos written between June and December 2016 by Christopher Steele. Manafort is a major figure mentioned in the Steele dossier, where allegations are made about Manafort's relationships and actions toward the Trump campaign, Russia, Ukraine, and Viktor Yanukovych. The dossier claims:

- that "the Republican candidate's campaign manager, Paul MANAFORT" had "managed" the "well-developed conspiracy of co-operation between [the Trump campaign] and the Russian leadership," and that he used "foreign policy adviser, Carter PAGE, and others as intermediaries." (Dossier, p. 7)
- that Yanukovych told Putin he had been making untraceable "kick-back payments" to Manafort, who was Trump's campaign manager at the time. (Dossier, p. 20)

== Indictments and charges ==
Plea agreement by Paul Manafort providing full cooperation with the Special Counsel, Sep 14, 2018

Statement of charges Paul Manafort pleaded guilty to and agreed were true

On October 30, 2017, Manafort was arrested by the FBI after being indicted by a federal grand jury as part of Mueller's investigation into the Trump campaign. The indictment against Manafort and Rick Gates charged them with engaging in a conspiracy against the United States, engaging in a conspiracy to launder money, failing to file reports of foreign bank and financial accounts, (Note: Some of the alleged money laundering occurred through the Kyrgyzstan based Asia Universal Bank (AUB) with funds received in Manafort's Wachovia bank account in Virginia from the Party of Regions via the Belize based Neocom Systems Limited's AUB account on 14 October 2009; however, Manafort stated to the FBI on September 2, 2014, that he had never heard of Neocom Systems.) acting as an unregistered agent of a foreign principal, making false and misleading statements in documents filed and submitted under the Foreign Agents Registration Act (FARA), and making false statements. Prosecutors claimed Manafort laundered more than $18 million (equivalent to $23,642,411 in 2025), money he had received as compensation for lobbying and consulting services for Yanukovych.

Manafort and Gates pleaded not guilty to the charges at their court appearance on October 30, 2017. The US government asked the court to set Manafort's bail at $10 million and Gates at $5 million. The court placed Manafort and Gates under house arrest after prosecutors described them as flight risks. If convicted on all charges, Manafort could have faced decades in prison.

Following the hearing, Manafort's attorney Kevin M. Downing made a public statement to the press proclaiming his client's innocence while describing the federal charges stemming from the indictment as "ridiculous". Downing defended Manafort's decade-long lobbying effort for Yanukovych, describing their lucrative partnership as attempts to spread democracy and strengthen the relationship between the United States and Ukraine. Judge Stewart responded by threatening to impose a gag order, saying "I expect counsel to do their talking in this courtroom and in their pleadings and not on the courthouse steps." Revealed on September 13, 2018, Manafort and Donald Trump had signed a joint defense agreement allowing their attorneys to share information during the Mueller investigations and, previously, joint defense agreements had been arranged between Donald Trump and both Michael Cohen and Michael Flynn.

On November 30, 2017, Manafort's attorneys said that Manafort had reached a bail agreement with prosecutors that would free him from the house arrest he had been under since his indictment. He offered bail in the form of $11.65 million worth of real estate. While out on bond, Paul Manafort worked on an op-ed with a "Russian who has ties to the Russian intelligence service", prosecutors said in a court filing requesting that the judge in the case revoke Manafort's bond agreement.

On January 3, 2018, Manafort filed a lawsuit challenging Mueller's broad authority and alleging the Justice Department violated the law in appointing Mueller. A spokesperson for the department replied that "The lawsuit is frivolous but the defendant is entitled to file whatever he wants".

On February 2, 2018, the Department of Justice filed a motion seeking to dismiss the civil suit Manafort brought against Mueller. Judge Jackson dismissed the suit on April 27, 2018, citing precedent that a court should not use civil powers to interfere in an ongoing criminal case. She did not, however, make any judgment as to the merits of the arguments presented.

On February 22, 2018, both Manafort and Gates were further charged with additional crimes involving a tax avoidance scheme and bank fraud in Virginia. The charges were filed in the United States District Court for the Eastern District of Virginia, rather than in the District of Columbia, as the alleged tax fraud overt actions had occurred in Virginia and not in the District. The new indictment alleged that Manafort, with assistance from Gates, laundered over $30 million through offshore bank accounts between approximately 2006 and 2015. Manafort allegedly used funds in these offshore accounts to purchase real estate in the United States, in addition to personal goods and services.

On February 23, 2018, Gates pleaded guilty in federal court to lying to investigators and engaging in a conspiracy to defraud the United States. Through a spokesman, Manafort expressed disappointment in Gates' decision to plead guilty and said he had no similar plans. "I continue to maintain my innocence," he said.

On February 28, 2018, Manafort entered a not guilty plea in the District Court for the District of Columbia. Jackson subsequently set a trial date of September 17, 2018, and reprimanded Manafort and his attorney for violating her gag order by issuing a statement the previous week after former co-defendant Gates pleaded guilty. Manafort commented, "I had hoped and expected my business colleague would have had the strength to continue the battle to prove our innocence."

On March 8, 2018, Manafort also pleaded not guilty to bank fraud and tax charges in federal court in Alexandria, Virginia. Judge T. S. Ellis III of the Eastern District of Virginia set his trial on those charges to begin on July 10, 2018. He later pushed the trial back to July 24, citing a medical procedure involving a member of Ellis's family. Ellis also expressed concern that the special counsel and Mueller were only interested in charging Manafort to squeeze him for information that would reflect on Mr. Trump or lead to Trump's impeachment. Ellis later retracted his comments against the Mueller prosecution.

On May 30, 2018, friends of Manafort announced the establishment of a legal defense fund, with the intention to assist him in paying his legal bills.

On June 8, 2018, Manafort and Kilimnik were indicted for obstruction of justice and witness tampering. The charges involved allegations that Manafort had attempted to convince others to lie about an undisclosed lobbying effort on behalf of Ukraine's former pro-Russian government. Since this allegedly occurred while Manafort was under house arrest, Judge Jackson revoked Manafort's bail on June 15 and ordered him held in jail until his trial. Manafort was booked into the Northern Neck Regional Jail in Warsaw, Virginia, at 8:22 PM on June 15, 2018, where he was housed in the VIP section and kept in solitary confinement for his own safety. On June 22, Manafort's efforts to have the money laundering charges against him dismissed were rejected by the court. Citing Alexandria's D.C. suburbia status, abundant and significantly negative press coverage, and the margin by which Hillary Clinton won the Alexandria Division in the 2016 presidential election, Manafort moved the court for a change of venue to Roanoke, Virginia, on July 6, 2018, citing constitutional entitlement to a fair and unbiased trial. On July 10, Judge T. S. Ellis ordered Manafort to be transferred back to the Alexandria Detention Center, an order Manafort opposed.

In February 2023, Manafort agreed to pay $3.15 million to settle a civil suit brought by the Justice Department in 2022 regarding undisclosed foreign bank accounts.

=== New York State indictment ===
On March 13, 2019, the same day on which he was sentenced in the Washington case, Manafort was indicted by the Manhattan District Attorney on 16 charges related to mortgage fraud. District Attorney Cyrus Vance Jr. said the charges stemmed from an investigation launched in March 2017. Unlike his previous convictions, these were levied by the State of New York, and therefore, a presidential pardon cannot override or affect the sentence in the event of conviction. In August 2017, NBC News reported that a state investigator was assessing the legal basis for prosecuting potential defendants in the Mueller probe with state crimes, given that pressing such charges could legally provide an end run around any presidential pardons.

On December 18, 2019, Justice Maxwell Wiley of the New York Supreme Court, Criminal Term, New York County, dismissed the charges against Manafort. On August 20, 2020, the New York County District Attorney's Office appealed the dismissal to the New York Supreme Court, Appellate Division. In October 2020, a panel of the Appellate Division unanimously upheld the dismissal.

Despite Manafort being pardoned in December 2020 for his federal crimes, the Manhattan District Attorney's Office announced it would nevertheless continue to pursue state charges. However, on February 4, 2021, the New York Court of Appeals declined to hear the Manhattan District Attorney's appeal.

== Trials ==
The numerous indictments against Manafort were divided into two trials.

=== Eastern District of Virginia ===
Manafort was tried in the Eastern District of Virginia on eighteen charges, including tax evasion, bank fraud, and hiding foreign bank accounts - financial crimes uncovered during the special counsel's investigation into Russia's role in the 2016 election. The trial began on July 31, 2018, before U.S. District Judge T. S. Ellis III. On August 21, the jury found Manafort guilty on eight of the eighteen charges, while Ellis declared a mistrial on the other ten. He was convicted on five counts of tax fraud, one of the four counts of failing to disclose his foreign bank accounts, and two counts of bank fraud.

The jury was hung on three of the four counts of failing to disclose, as well as five counts of bank fraud, four of which were related to the Federal Savings Bank of Chicago run by Stephen Calk. Mueller's office advised the court that Manafort should receive a sentence of 20 to 24 years, a sentence consistent with federal guidelines, but on March 7, 2019, Ellis sentenced Manafort to just 47 months in prison, less nine months for time already served, adding that the recommended sentence was "excessive" and that Manafort had lived an "otherwise blameless life." However, Ellis noted that Manafort had not expressed "regret for engaging in wrongful conduct".

=== District of Columbia ===
Manafort's trial in the U.S. District Court for the District of Columbia was scheduled to begin in September 2018. He was charged with conspiracy to defraud the United States, money laundering, failing to register as a foreign lobbyist, making false statements to investigators, and witness tampering. On September 14, 2018, Manafort entered into a plea deal with prosecutors and pleaded guilty to two charges: conspiracy to defraud the United States and witness tampering. He also agreed to forfeit to the government cash and property with a combined worth estimated between $11 and $26 million, and to cooperate fully with the Special Counsel. A tentative sentencing date for Manafort's guilty plea in the D.C. case has been set for March 2019.

Mueller's office stated in a November 26, 2018, court filing that Manafort had repeatedly lied to prosecutors about a variety of matters, breaching the terms of his plea agreement. Manafort's attorneys disputed the assertion. On December 7, 2018, the special counsel's office filed a document with the court, listing five areas in which they claimed Manafort has lied to them, which they stated negated the plea agreement. DC District Court judge Amy Berman Jackson ruled on February 13, 2019, that Manafort had violated his plea deal by repeatedly lying to prosecutors.

In a February 7, 2019, hearing before U.S. District Court for the District of Columbia Judge Amy Berman Jackson, prosecutors speculated that Manafort had concealed facts about his activities to enhance the possibility of his receiving a pardon. They said that Manafort's work with Ukraine had continued after he had made his plea deal and that during the Trump campaign, he met with his campaign deputy, Rick Gates, who also had pleaded guilty in the case, and with alleged Russian Federation intelligence agent, Konstantin Kilimnik, in an exclusive New York cigar bar. Gates said the three left the premises separately, each using different exits.

On March 13, 2019, Jackson sentenced Manafort to 73 months in prison, with 30 months concurrent with the jail time he received in the Virginia case, for a resultant sentence of an additional 43 months in jail (30 additional months for conspiracy to defraud the United States and 13 additional months for witness tampering). Manafort also apologized for his actions.

=== Prison sentence ===
December 2020 pardon granted by Donald Trump

Manafort was jailed from June 2018 until May 2020. During that time, he was briefly held at the United States Penitentiary Canaan in Waymart, Pennsylvania. He was held at Federal Correctional Institution, Loretto in Loretto, Pennsylvania (inmate #35207-016). In June 2019, he was moved to the Metropolitan Correctional Center, New York in Manhattan. In August 2019, he was moved back to the Federal Correctional Institution, Loretto, Pennsylvania, with an expected release date of December 25, 2024. On May 13, 2020, Manafort was released to home confinement over COVID-19 concerns. On December 23, 2020, Trump issued Manafort a full pardon.

As part of his pardon, some of his forfeitures were unwound. He was able to retain his large house in Water Mill, New York, his brownstone in Brooklyn, his apartment on the edge of Manhattan's Chinatown, and assets seized in an account at Federal Savings Bank. He did not retain assets that were already forfeited and sold, such as an apartment in Trump Tower in Manhattan, a bank account, and a life insurance policy.

=== Law licenses ===
In 2017, Massachusetts lawyer J. Whitfield Larrabee filed a misconduct complaint against Manafort in the Connecticut Statewide Grievance Committee, seeking his disbarment on the basis of "conduct involving dishonesty, fraud, deceit, and misrepresentation." In 2018, after Manafort pleaded guilty to conspiracy, the Connecticut Office of the Chief Disciplinary Counsel brought a case against Manafort. In January 2019, ahead of a disbarment hearing, Manafort resigned from the Connecticut bar and waived his right to ever seek readmission.

Manafort was disbarred from the DC Bar on May 9, 2019.

== Personal life ==
Manafort has been married to Kathleen Bond Manafort since August 12, 1978. They have two daughters, including Jessica.

== See also ==
- Links between Trump associates and Russian officials
- Carter Page
- Conspiracy theories related to the Trump–Ukraine scandal
- Konstantin Kilimnik
- List of people pardoned or granted clemency by the president of the United States
- Timeline of Russian interference in the 2016 United States elections
- Timeline of investigations into Trump and Russia (2017)
- Timeline of investigations into Trump and Russia (January–June 2018)
- Timeline of investigations into Trump and Russia (July–December 2018)
- Timeline of investigations into Trump and Russia (2019)
