= Black, Manafort, Stone and Kelly =

Lobbying firm based in Washington, D.C.

- Industry: Lobbying firm
- Founded: 1980
- Founder: Roger Stone, Paul Manafort, Charles Black
- Defunct: January 1, 1991
- Fate: Acquired by Burson-Marsteller
- Headquarters: Washington, D.C.
- Key people: Roger Stone

Black, Manafort, Stone and Kelly (BMSK, often simply Black, Manafort, and Stone) was a lobbying firm based in Washington, D.C., and formed in 1980 by Roger Stone, Paul Manafort and Charles Black and purchased in 1991 by Burson-Marsteller. The firm lobbied on behalf of prominent Republicans, businesses and foreign governments.

== History ==
As Black, Manafort & Stone, the firm was one of the first political consulting groups to work for Ronald Reagan's presidential candidacy in 1980, and would later also have extensive connections to the presidential administrations of George H. W. Bush and Bill Clinton. Donald Trump was the firm's first client.

In 1984 it was renamed to Black, Manafort, Stone and Kelly (BMSK) & associates after Peter G. Kelly was recruited.

The firm advised, represented, and lobbied the US Congress on behalf of, numerous foreign governments and heads of state from both representative democracies and unelected dictatorships including dictator Ferdinand Marcos of the Philippines, Mohamed Siad Barre of Somalia, dictator Mobutu Sese Seko of Zaire, and Jonas Savimbi of Angola. According to "The Torturers' Lobby", a report published by The Center for Public Integrity, by 1991-1992 their work with dictators brought in $3.3 million in those 2 years.

During the 1988 presidential campaign in the United States, it was disclosed that BMSK retained the island nation of the Bahamas as a client at a time its leadership was being attacked for alleged ties to drug traffickers. BMSK officials insisted that they intended only to help the Bahamas obtain more United States aid for efforts to curb drug smugglers.

Domestically the firm represented Bethlehem Steel, Rupert Murdoch's News Corp, the Tobacco Institute, and helped elect Senators Phil Gramm, Jesse Helms, Charles McCurdy Mathias Jr., Arlen Specter, Paula Hawkins and David F. Durenberger—and worked on legislation that benefitted the firm's clients.

On January 1, 1991, BMSK was acquired by Burson-Marsteller who between 1989 and 1994 had acquired Gold & Liebengood which was founded by Martin B. Gold and Howard Scholer Liebengood in 1984. Manafort left in 1995 to start a new firm. BMSK merged with Gold & Liebengood to form BKSH & Associates in 1996.

According to Mustafa Nayyem in 2007, the Saint Petersburg office of BMSK was headed by Leonid Avrashov (Ukrainian: Леонід Аврашов) who, according to Serhiy Leshchenko in 2017, also had a credit card with oligarch Rinat Akhmetov's First Ukrainian International Bank (PUMB) (Ukrainian: Перший український міжнародний банк (ПУМБ)).

== Personnel ==
=== Principals ===
- Charles R. Black Jr.
- Paul Manafort
- Roger Stone
- Peter G. Kelly
- R. Scott Pastrick
- James C. Healey, Jr.

=== Others ===
- Lee Atwater became a senior partner in the political-consulting function of the firm (the partners claimed the firm kept political and lobbying functions separate) the day after President Reagan defeated Walter F. Mondale in 1984.

== See also ==
- Angolan Civil War
- Lobbying in the United States
- Get Me Roger Stone
