= Nicola Di Girolamo =

Italian politician

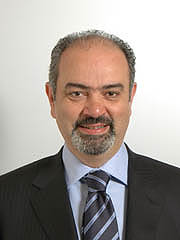
- Nicola in 2008

Member of the Senate of the Republic
- In office 2008–2010

Personal details
- Born: Nicola Di Girolamo; June 5, 1960 (age 65) Rome, Italy
- Party: The People of Freedom

Nicola Di Girolamo (born 25 June 1960) is an Italian politician who served as a The People of Freedom Member of the Senate of the Republic from 2008 to 2010.

On 3 March 2010, he was removed from the Italian Senate for his alleged involvement with 'Ndrangheta and was placed under house arrest for his alleged involvement in a more than €2 billion money laundering scheme. Numerous persons in Silvio Berlusconi's political party were allegedly involved.

He was convicted of criminal association aimed at tax evasion, international money laundering and electoral exchange, and, on 15 July 2011, he was sentenced to a five year imprisonment and received a 4.2 million euros fine for restitution.

He was named in the 2016 Panama Papers.
