= Peter G. Kelly =

American lobbyist and political consultant

Chair of the Finance Committee of the Democratic National Committee
- In office February 27, 1981 – February 1, 1985

Treasurer of the Democratic National Committee
- In office March 1979 – February 27, 1981
- Preceded by: Evan Dobelle
- Succeeded by: Charles Curry

Personal details
- Born: 1938 (age 87–88)
- Occupation: Lobbyist and political consultant
- Awards: 2015 Luminary Award

Peter Galbraith Kelly Sr. (born 1938) is an American lobbyist and political consultant. He received the 2015 Luminary Award in The World Affairs Council of Connecticut.

== Education ==
After education at Georgetown University and Yale Law School. Kelly founded his own law firm, Updike, Kelly and Spellacy.

== Career ==
He served as the Democratic National Committee treasurer (1979–1981) and finance chair (1981–1985). He served as senior political advisor to Al Gore in 1988 and 2000, Bill Clinton in 1992 and 1996, and John Kerry in 2004.

Kelly was a founding partner Black, Manafort, Stone and Kelly (BMSK) and its successor, Black, Kelly, Scruggs & Healey (BKSH & Associates), one of the most powerful lobbying firms in the United States, owned by public relations powerhouse Burson-Marsteller.

=== Activity in international relations ===
After retiring from BKSH, Kelly worked with The PBN Company, has served as Vice Chairman of International Foundation for Election Systems (IFES), as director and treasurer for the National Democratic Institute, and as managing director of Burson-Marsteller in Latin America. He is a former Chairman of IFES's Board.
