= Food of War =

Food of war is a multidisciplinary art collective founded in December 2010. The founding members include Omar Castaneda, a visual artist from Colombia and the United Kingdom; Hernán Barros, a special effects artist also from Colombia and the United Kingdom; and Andreina Fuentes, an artist, collector, and entrepreneur from Caracas, Venezuela.

== History ==
=== Early Years and Inaugural Exhibition ===
Food of War's journey began with the exhibition "Clouded Lands," launched in September 2015 at BMSP London. This itinerant showcase focused on the aftermath of the Chernobyl disaster, touring international venues such as the National Arsenal Museum in Kiev, the International Peace Congress in Berlin, the Foundation Caja de Burgos in Spain, and The London Rich Mix. Featuring contributions from over 25 artists from various backgrounds, "Clouded Lands" was a poignant tribute to the nuclear disaster's impact.

=== Expansion and Recognition ===
Over the years, Food of War has participated in prominent art fairs including ARCO Madrid, JustMad, Art Lima, Zona Maco, and SP-Arte. Significant projects such as "Peace at the Tables" at the Museum of Contemporary Arts in Bogotá highlight the collective's dedication to exploring complex sociopolitical issues through art.

=== Adaptation and Innovation ===
Despite global challenges like the 2020 quarantine, Food of War continued to innovate, collaborating with curator Gabriella Sonabend on the immersive exhibition "Terra Nexus" at Proposition Studios and Southbank Centre, which explored Human Ecology.

The following year, the collective introduced "Forbidden Fruit" an exploration of Immersive Gastronomy, further showcasing their commitment to pushing artistic boundaries.

=== Recent Activities ===
In late 2022, a retrospective of Food of War's work spanning 12 years was displayed at the prestigious Saatchi Gallery in the United Kingdom. The collective continued to expand its influence with exhibitions such as "Uitmelken: Harvesting Money" in Amsterdam and participation in international art festivals including the 60th Venice Biennale, Bienal de la Havana, MMMad Festival, and 48h Neukölln Festival in 2024.

== Exhibitions ==
The first massive exhibition of Food of War was the "Clouded Lands", held in the National Art and Culture Museum Complex "Mystetskyi Arsenal" of Kyiv in Ukraine in 2016. Then, the exhibition was moved to Berlin to participate in the Congress Disarm! For a Climate of Peace, and the Centro de Arte Caja de Burgos in Spain, and finally in London. In each country, the artist collective worked closely with local artists to address the Chernobyl disaster and how this event changed the way Europeans eat.

=== Exhibitions by date ===
- November 8, 2014, Aguapanela is my cup of tea, The Container, London
- August 26, 2015, Panela: The New Gold of Colombia, Chalton Gallery, London
- September 24–30, 2015, BSMT SPACE, Dalston, London
- February 23–28, 2016, Justmad 7 Emerging Art Fair, COAM Sede del Arte, Madrid, Spain
- March 9 – April 16, 2016, Panela: The New Gold of Colombia, Museum of Contemporary Art (MAC) Bogota, Colombia
- April 5–28, 2017, Clouded Lands, Rich Mix, Mezzanine Gallery, London
- May 27 – 9, Clouded Lands, Arsenal de Mystetskyi, Kyiv Ukraine
- February 21–26, 2017, Justmad 8, COAM La Sede del Arte Madrid, Spain
- February 19, 2018, Insect Flesh, Art week in Mexico City, Mexico
- April 18–4, 2018, Contamination, Art Fair Art Lima, Lima, Peru
- April 4, 2017, Ópera dos Porcos, Rabieh Gallery, São Paulo, Brazil
- November 15, 2019 – February 20, 2020. ¿Paz en las Mesas?. Museum of Contemporary Art (MAC) Bogota, Colombia
- 2020, The Spirit of the Beehive, Terra Nexus, Proposition Studios, London (United Kingdom), Enlatados, ArtChicó, Bogotá (Colombia)
- 2021, Crying at the River (lloratón por Colombia), performance, London (United Kingdom), The Colony’s Collapse, Terra Nexus II, Proposition Studios, London (United Kingdom), The Forbidden Fruit, Shoreditch, London (United Kingdom).
- 2022, American Beauty, Galeria Casasur, JustMad, Madrid (Spain), War Cake, Façade Video Festival, Plovdiv (Bulgaria), Food of War: Food & Conflict in Challenging Times, Clandestina Washere, Miami (United States), The Forbidden Journey: Food & Conflict in Challenging Times, Saatchi Gallery, London (United Kingdom), Sana Distancia, social intervention in the Santa Fe neighborhood, Bogotá (Colombia).
- 2023, The Forbidden Fruit: Object of Desire, Arts Connection Gallery, Miami (United States), Üitmelken: Harvesting Money, PuntWG, Amsterdam (Netherlands), When Water is Safer than Land, Palma Summer Artweek, Bellas Artes Adema University, Palma de Mallorca (Spain), Rabbit Revolutionaries, ARCO, Madrid (Spain).
- 2024, Memoria Externa, MMMad Festival, Madrid (Spain), Personal Structures, European Cultural Center, Venice Biennale, Venice (Italy).

== Residencies ==
- 2021, Proposition Studios, London, United Kingdom
- 2023, AirWG Artist Residency, Amsterdam, Netherlands

== Grants ==
- 2020*, Proposition Studios, Grant for Art Collectives
- 2021*, Proposition Studios, Grant for Art Collectives
- 2023, Arts Connection Foundation, The Forbidden Fruit: Object of Desire (Grant for Pioneering Collectives), Arts Connection Foundation, Üitmelken: Harvesting Money (Grant for Pioneering Collectives).

Food of War's unwavering commitment to collaboration, innovation, and societal reflection continues to drive its exciting ventures and meaningful contributions to the global artistic landscape.
