= Burson (company) =

American public relations firm

- Type: Public
- Industry: Public relations; Marketing; Communications
- Founded: 1953; 73 years ago (Burson-Marsteller); 1970; 56 years ago (Cohn & Wolfe); 2018; 8 years ago (Burson Cohn & Wolfe)
- Founders: Harold Burson & Bill Marsteller; Bob Cohn & Norman Wolfe
- Headquarters: 175 Greenwich Street 3 World Trade Center New York, NY 10007
- Key people: Corey duBrowa (global CEO); AnnaMaria DeSalva (global chairman)
- Number of employees: 6,000 (2024)
- Parent: WPP plc
- Website: bursonglobal.com

Burson (formerly Burson Cohn & Wolfe (BCW)) is a global public relations and communications firm, headquartered in New York City, focused on building reputation for clients.

In February 2018, parent WPP Group PLC announced that it had merged its subsidiaries Cohn & Wolfe with Burson-Marsteller into Burson Cohn & Wolfe (BCW). In January 2024, WPP announced plans to merge BCW with Hill & Knowlton, forming the new agency, Burson. The merger was finalized in July 2024.

Donna Imperato served as global chief executive officer (CEO) from 2018 to 2023. She was previously CEO at Cohn & Wolfe. She announced her retirement in January 2023 and was replaced in August 2023 by Corey duBrowa, who previously served as head of communications and public affairs at Alphabet and is now Global CEO of Burson.

== Operations ==
BCW (Burson Cohn & Wolfe) was the world's third-largest public relations firm by revenue, as of 2018. According to PRovoke Media, the merger with Hill & Knowlton in 2024 made the newly formed Burson a top two global PR firm. It employed more than 4,000 people in 42 countries as of 2019. The company is the flagship brand in the Burson Group, whose brands include: AxiCom, Buchanan Communications, GCI Health, and Hill & Knowlton.

Burson is split into divisions by geographic region: North America, Latin America, Europe and Africa, the Middle East, and Asia-Pacific. Each region is led by a regional CEO who reports directly to the global CEO. Notable employees include Karen Hughes, former senior aide to U.S. president George W. Bush, Ari Fleischer, former White House Press Secretary, Tom Reed, a former six-term Congressman from Corning, New York, Thomas Nides, Former US Ambassador to Israel; Lord Watson of Richmond, a member of the House of Lords; Perry Yeatman, senior vice president of corporate affairs at Kraft Foods; Kathryn Beiser, vice president of corporate communications at Discover Financial Services; Bob Feldman and Jeff Hunt, co-founders and principals of PulsePoint Group communications consultancy; Daniel Lamarre, CEO of Cirque du Soleil, and prominent figures in a number of PR companies, including the CEOs of Ketchum Inc., Cohn & Wolfe and Wunderman.

Burson offers clients creative content and strategic communications services across the following sectors: business-to-business, consumer, corporate, crisis management, corporate social responsibility, healthcare, public affairs, and technology. The company focuses on building and protecting reputations. It uses a framework and consulting methodology to assess and actively manage what it refers to as “reputation capital” across four areas: company actions, communications, social narratives, and stakeholder beliefs.

== History ==
Burson traces its roots to the founding of Burson-Marsteller in 1953 and Cohn & Wolfe in 1970. As part of a restructuring strategy, in 2018, parent company WPP PLC merged Burson-Marsteller, the sixth-largest PR firm worldwide, and Cohn & Wolfe, which ranked 12th. The merger created the third-largest PR firm, which was named Burson Cohn & Wolfe (BCW). WPP stated that it merged the firms due to their complementary skills, including Burson-Marsteller's public affairs and corporate work and Cohn & Wolfe's digital creative content, consumer, and health care work.

In August 2018, BCW acquired HZ, an integrated creative agency, headquartered in Rockville, Maryland, with additional offices in Baltimore, Los Angeles, New York, and Washington, D.C. In April 2024, the leadership of HZ completed a buyback of the firm from BCW.

=== Merger with Hill & Knowlton ===
In January 2024, WPP announced the planned merger of BCW with Hill & Knowlton. The merger was completed in July, and the new company was named Burson. It has over 6,000 employees, making it one of the largest PR agencies in the world. Corey duBrowa was named global CEO of Burson, and Hill & Knowlton CEO AnnaMaria DeSalva was named global chairman.

== Burson-Marsteller ==
=== History ===
Prior to its merger with Cohn & Wolfe, Burson-Marsteller comprised 77 offices and 85 affiliate offices, operating in 110 countries across six continents. The company was founded by Harold Burson (1921–2020) and William Marsteller in 1953, and, by the early 1980s, had become one of the largest public relations companies in the world. In 1979, it became a subsidiary of Young & Rubicam, which in turn was acquired later by WPP Group PLC. In 2018, it merged with Cohn & Wolfe and was renamed Burson Cohn & Wolfe.

==== 1950s and 1960s: Company founding and early history ====
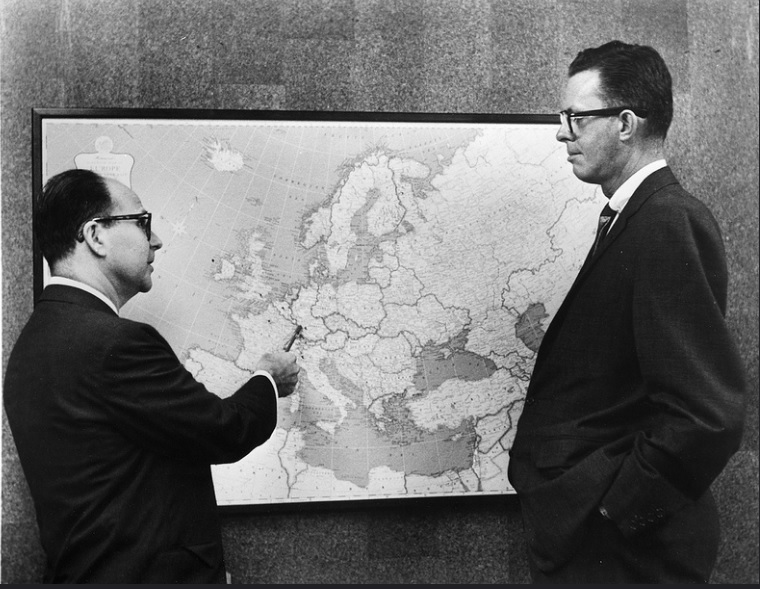
Harold Burson and Bill Marsteller plan out their firm's expansion into Europe

Prior to the establishment of Burson-Marsteller, co-founders Harold Burson and William "Bill" Marsteller owned separate agencies focused on public relations and advertising, respectively. Burson had established Harold Burson Public Relations in 1946, based in New York City. Meanwhile, Marsteller had founded the Chicago-based advertising agency Marsteller Gebhardt and Reed (later renamed Marsteller Inc.) in 1951. Burson and Marsteller met in 1952 when Marsteller needed a PR agency to work on an account for his client, Rockwell Manufacturing, and was referred to Burson. The two agencies shared the Rockwell account and, later, an account for Clark Engineering Equipment Company. In 1953, they entered into a partnership, creating a new public relations firm that was owned jointly by Burson and by Marsteller's advertising agency.

Beginning with a staff of four and just two main clients, operations quickly grew, and in the early 1960s Burson-Marsteller began to establish a presence outside of the United States. In 1960, they opened an office in Toronto, Ontario, Canada, becoming the first U.S. PR agency to do so. One year later, in 1961, following the founding of the Common Market in Europe, the company established its first European office in Geneva, followed shortly by an office in Brussels in 1965. At this time, Hill & Knowlton was the only other U.S. PR firm with an office outside the United States. In 1967, Burson-Marsteller opened its first London office.

==== 1970s: General Motors ====
One of the firm's earliest clients was the Electro-Motive Division of General Motors (GM), which made diesel locomotives, beginning in 1956. It was the only PR agency retained by GM at the time. In 1970, Burson-Marsteller was engaged by the main division of GM to manage its PR, following stiff competition from larger firms. According to Harold Burson, GM was seeking outside PR management following the publication of Ralph Nader's book Unsafe at Any Speed, which called into question GM's design practices, and led to negative media representation of the company. GM remained a client of Burson-Marsteller for the next 11 years. At the time they took on GM, Burson-Marsteller was the 10th largest PR firm in the United States. In 1974, Wolcott and Company, a Los Angeles-based public relations firm founded by Robert "Bob" B. Wolcott Jr., merged with Burson-Marsteller. Wolcott Co. had offices in New York, Washington, D.C., and San Francisco. Bob Wolcott joined the executive management team and was in charge of West Coast and Asian operations.

==== 1980s: Young & Rubicam and worldwide expansion ====
In 1979, the company was sold to the communications group Young & Rubicam. In his memoirs, Burson described the decision as being made for two primary reasons. First, Burson-Marsteller needed capital to finance its expansion. Second, Marsteller's advertising agency had declined in profitability and "needed management fixing". After the takeover, Burson became executive vice-president and a board member of Young & Rubicam. As part of Young & Rubicam in the late 1970s and early 1980s, Burson-Marsteller became known for its crisis management work. Clients consulting Burson-Marsteller for crisis management included: Babcock & Wilcox, following the Three Mile Island accident in 1979; Johnson & Johnson, during the 1982 Tylenol crisis; and Union Carbide Corporation following the 1984 Bhopal disaster. The company was also involved in the introduction of New Coke in early 1985. In interviews, Burson has stated that the negative reaction of the public to the new product was unexpected. Following the reintroduction of the original Coke recipe, the strategy that Burson-Marsteller advised for Coca-Cola was to "be humble" and apologize to the U.S. public for deciding to change to New Coke. Just two months after original Coke was reintroduced as Classic Coke, sales of Coke, Coca-Cola Classic and Cherry Coke had risen 10 percent compared with the previous year.

The 1980s also saw the company become involved in large-scale publicity events. In 1984, Burson-Marsteller first brought entertainment and sports together to generate publicity for its clients with the organization of the AT&T Olympic Torch Relay, sponsored by the telecommunications company. This was the largest promotional event that the company had undertaken to date, with up to 150 people working full-time on organizing the 8,000-mile relay. One year later, Burson-Marsteller executive Geoff Nightingale came up with the idea of Hands Across America as a fundraising event for USA for Africa sponsored by its client Coca-Cola.

By 1983, Burson-Marsteller had become the world's largest PR firm, with $63.8 million in revenue for that year. The following year it acquired Cohn & Wolfe, an Atlanta-based public relations firm, which operated as a subsidiary of Burson-Marsteller until 2000. Burson-Marsteller had established its first offices in Asia in 1973, in Hong Kong, Singapore, Kuala Lumpur and Tokyo. By the mid-1980s, it had further expanded overseas operations with offices in Australia and New Zealand. A subsidiary of the Xinhua News Agency (New China News Agency) partnered with Burson-Marsteller in 1985, providing commercial public relations for foreign firms in China and for Chinese companies internationally. This subsidiary later became China Global Public Relations, mainland China's first specialized public relations consulting firm. Following Burson-Marsteller's appointment as public relations counsel for the Seoul Olympics in 1988, it became the first foreign public relations firm to open a wholly owned communications and marketing office in South Korea.

Burson-Marsteller also expanded into Central and South America during the 1980s. Offices were established in San Juan, Puerto Rico, and São Paulo. A regional headquarters was established in Miami, Florida, in May 1989, and the company won MasterCard International's Latin American account, which became one of the firm's largest accounts.

The agency's business grew about 24% annually during the 1980s, according to Burson, and PR Week stated in 1988 that Burson-Marsteller was "the largest international PR firm in the world". The following year, Burson stepped down as CEO. He continued to work on major accounts such as Coca-Cola and Merrill Lynch, while James H. Dowling succeeded him as the second CEO of Burson-Marsteller.

==== 1990s: Global presence and Philip Morris ====
By 1990, Burson-Marsteller had branches in 28 countries, with 52 offices and over 2,300 employees. In 1991, the firm acquired Black, Manafort, Stone and Kelly (BMSK), which was perhaps most well known for their work with prominent Republicans and businesses as well as foreign governments, including controversial autocrats and despots.

International work carried out by Burson-Marsteller in the early 1990s included a public relations campaign undertaken for the Egyptian Ministry of Tourism in 1993, following terrorist attacks on tourists in Egypt. The campaign aimed to encourage tourists to visit Egypt, focusing on recent archaeological discoveries.

In December 1994, the company received attention after an executive at Burson-Marsteller was killed by a mailbomb sent by the "Unabomber". The Washington Post reported that Ted Kaczynski targeted Burson-Marsteller executive Thomas Mosser due to a belief that Exxon had consulted with Burson-Marsteller during the Valdez oil spill. Burson-Marsteller stated that they had advised Exxon in the past and had been asked to review and analyze Exxon's handling of the disaster afterwards, but had not been engaged to manage the crisis itself.

In the 1990s the company also received considerable attention for PR campaigns on behalf of tobacco company Altria (formerly Philip Morris Companies Inc.) in which it was engaged to discredit anti-smoking research and legislation attempts. In 1993, Burson-Marsteller helped organize a response to a 1992 United States Environmental Protection Agency (EPA) report which had identified secondhand smoke as a Group A human carcinogen. The strategy employed by Burson-Marsteller was to encourage doubt among consumers about the scientific validity of the EPA report and to target legislators who supported curbs on smoking. As part of this strategy, the company organized a smokers' rights group called the National Smokers Alliance (NSA), to target politicians who supported anti-smoking legislation. The NSA was founded with an estimated $4 million in Philip Morris seed money and the involvement of some fifty other tobacco industry players.

Their activities also included support for The Advancement of Sound Science Coalition (TASSC), which was created in 1993 by APCO Worldwide, another major public relations firm, with funding from Philip Morris. In Europe, Burson-Marsteller provided support for an advertising campaign in 1996 carried out by Philip Morris. Advertisements were published comparing the health risks of secondhand smoke exposure with a range of other activities. This campaign received significant coverage in the media across Europe. Burson-Marsteller was criticized in the media for its involvement with Philip Morris, and in 1999 a demonstration was held outside the firm's headquarters, protesting their role as PR for Philip Morris. Those involved went to great lengths not to reveal the tobacco industry support of these organizations, to give the appearance they represented grassroots opposition to anti-smoking laws rather than the business interests of their sponsors.

At the end of the 1990s, the firm had retained its position as the largest PR agency in the world, with fees of over $274 million that year. As part of the company's continued growth, it acquired grassroots lobbying organization Direct Impact in April 1999. In the same year, Harold Burson was named by PR Week as the PR industry's "most influential person of the 20th century".

==== 2000s ====
Young & Rubicam became a subsidiary of the media group WPP Group PLC in 2000, and Burson-Marsteller became part of WPP. The U.S. Bureau of Engraving and Printing hired Burson-Marsteller in 1995 to publicize the new designs of U.S. paper money, both in the United States and internationally. The Bureau had launched its second redesign of the bills in ten years, with the intention of preventing counterfeiting. Burson-Marsteller had also been involved in research prior to the redesign to ensure that the new designs would be acceptable to the public.

In December 2005, Burson-Marsteller acquired the Indian firm Genesis PR as a wholly owned subsidiary. Following this acquisition, India and China became Burson-Marsteller's second and third-largest markets worldwide, based on number of employees. The renamed Genesis Burson-Marsteller was announced as the company's hub for the South Asian market in 2008. Prior to the acquisition, since 2002, Genesis had been Burson-Marsteller's exclusive representative in India.

Mark Penn became the CEO of Burson-Marsteller in December 2005, following a period of instability during which there were three leadership changes in one year. Penn's predecessor, Tom Nides, had left Burson-Marsteller after eight months in the role. A White House political pollster for six years, he was best known for his work with President Bill Clinton, Tony Blair and Bill Gates. Penn (who had not previously worked within PR) introduced new strategies at Burson-Marsteller, including one called "DIGS" (digital, integrated, global, strategic) and "Evidence-Based Communications", described by the company as a scientific and data-driven approach to communications, which drew from Penn's background in research.

Penn and Burson-Marsteller received negative media attention in 2008 when his work on behalf of the Colombian government (then seeking a free-trade agreement with the United States) became a political liability for the presidential campaign of Hillary Clinton, who was opposed to a free-trade pact with Colombia. Penn described the dual role an "error in judgment" following which the Colombian government terminated its client relationship. Clinton later revised her opinion in favor of the free-trade pact.

Penn's leadership at Burson-Marsteller has been cited by PRWeek as a model for the public relations industry, particularly combining public affairs experience with public relations. In April 2011, industry expert Paul Holmes named Burson-Marsteller the U.S. Large Agency of the Year, citing its double-digit growth within the United States and record 2010 profits as factors in the award, crediting Penn with improved performance and Burson's "global recovery".

Burson-Marsteller's clients in the late 2000s included Ford Motor Company, which hired the company as crisis management consultants in 2009, and American International Group (AIG), on whose behalf the firm undertook crisis management work in 2008 and 2009. Burson-Marsteller was brought in by AIG to help respond to requests for information from customers, employees and the media, due to the liquidity crisis it suffered in September 2008. In 2010, Burson-Marsteller announced its commitment to no longer accept work on behalf of the tobacco industry.

In May 2011, Burson-Marsteller was hired by Facebook to conduct a PR attack on Google. Burson-Marsteller contacted a number of media companies and bloggers in an effort to get them to write unflattering stories about Google. The campaign backfired when one of the bloggers went public by posting the emails he received from Burson-Marsteller on the Internet.

Don Baer, the former communications director for the Clinton administration, was named CEO of Burson-Marsteller in 2012. He served in that capacity through February 2018, when WPP merged Burson-Marsteller with Cohn & Wolfe to create Burson Cohn & Wolfe (BCW).

=== Services ===
Burson-Marsteller provided public relations and advertising services to clients, including multinational corporations and government agencies. It was known primarily for its crisis management services and political lobbying. It won numerous awards from the public relations industry over the years for its work in high-profile crisis management, including the 1997 Asian financial crisis, a 2002 extortion attempt against British company GlaxoSmithKline, and a response described as the "gold standard" for its crisis management of the 1982 Chicago Tylenol poisonings. Other high-profile crisis cases include the manufacturers of the Three Mile Island Nuclear Generating Station and Egypt following terrorist attacks on tourists in 1993. At times it has also been the subject of protests and criticism for its work for regimes facing severe human rights criticisms (Argentina and Indonesia). The firm also worked in corporate PR, public affairs, technology and healthcare communications, and brand marketing.

=== Training ===
Within the industry, Burson-Marsteller was known for its effective company employee training programs and for having helped to develop the careers of many members of the public relations industry. From early in the company's history, employees were expected to participate in ongoing training. Due to this practice, Harold Burson estimated in the early 1980s that 65 percent of the company's costs were related to human resources. The aim of Burson-Marsteller's training was to create a uniform approach to public relations across all clients and locations. In 2005, the company launched Burson-Marsteller University, providing comprehensive training to its executives in developing corporate communications that are consistent worldwide while remaining culturally appropriate. Specific training was also provided to employees relevant to their practice areas. In the Issues & Crisis Group, employees were trained to communicate the correct information during crises for a variety of different clients and issues.

In an interview in 2003, Harold Burson was quoted as saying that Burson-Marsteller has been "A training ground for the industry," with more than 35,000 people continuing to participate in the company's alumni network as of 2010.

=== Crisis management ===
Through its crisis management work, Burson-Marsteller was identified with many major corporate crises of the past half-century. Burson-Marsteller added crisis management as a service following Young & Rubicam's 1979 takeover of the company. In 2008, Burson-Marsteller established a global practice called the Issues & Crisis Group (ICG) that focused specifically on this area of communications. The practice had a network of specially certified experts in crisis management located in its offices worldwide. Services included providing communication with clients' employees, customers and the general public during crises.

In addition to helping clients deal with crises as they occurred, Burson-Marsteller also provided clients with assistance in developing contingency plans for potential crises. The firm provided intelligence reports to clients either hourly or daily that advised of new issues, public reception, and critical or supportive responses and carried out market research into CEO and corporate reputation. Burson-Marsteller offered services including communications tools and techniques intended to help companies recover following a crisis.

Significant clients included Shell and ExxonMobil.

The company received a number of awards for its work in crisis management. In 1999, Burson-Marsteller was awarded a Public Relations Society of America Silver Anvil, the public relations industry's highest award for organizations, recognizing its communications program aimed at restoring confidence in the Korean economy during the 1997 Asian financial crisis. It also received a Silver Anvil in 2003 for its work with the United States Postal Service for managing communications during the anthrax crisis. In 2002, the company received a Golden World Award, the highest award from the UK-based International Public Relations Association, for its crisis management work on behalf of GlaxoSmithKline following an extortion attempt involving its Panadol brand.

Since the early 1980s, Burson-Marsteller had dealt with a range of much-publicized crisis management situations, from industrial accidents to acts of terrorism. Notable early cases include work involving the 1982 and 1986 Tylenol contaminations and the Bhopal disaster.

==== Tylenol ====
Burson-Marsteller's handling of the Chicago Tylenol poisonings for Johnson & Johnson in September 1982 has been referred to as the "gold standard" for crisis management. Seven people in the Chicago area were killed when they took Tylenol capsules tainted with cyanide, and Johnson & Johnson went to Burson-Marsteller for advice on how to approach the situation. After an eighth death, which occurred in California, the response by Johnson & Johnson was to announce a nationwide recall of all Tylenol capsules. Burson-Marsteller organized a press conference televised across 35 markets in the United States, addressing the recall and reporting that the product tampering had occurred on the shelves, not during manufacturing. During late October 1982, a brief television campaign was undertaken asking for the public to trust Tylenol, and Burson-Marsteller carried out nationwide polling which found that the majority of the population still had confidence in Johnson & Johnson. Ninety percent of respondents stated that they did not hold the manufacturer responsible for the deaths.

At a Burson-Marsteller organized press conference in November 1982, Johnson & Johnson introduced new tamper-proof packaging, becoming the first company to introduce triple-sealed packaging, which later became the industry standard. The conference gave Johnson & Johnson the opportunity to announce that they were reintroducing Tylenol capsules to the market and would replace any Tylenol that consumers had thrown away. In addition, Johnson & Johnson published advertisements with coupons for consumers to use to replace Tylenol that had been thrown out, and produced commercials and print advertisements thanking the public for their "continuing confidence and support". Within six weeks of the introduction of the repackaged product, Tylenol's sales returned to the previous level. In 1983, Burson-Marsteller was awarded a Silver Anvil for "out-of-the-ordinary crisis management" for its work with Johnson & Johnson. The company was brought back to handle crisis management during a second Tylenol crisis, involving cyanide tainting in New York in 1986.

==== Bhopal ====
The Bhopal disaster was one of the world's worst industrial catastrophes. In 1984, a gas leak killed over 2,000 people at a plant in Bhopal, India, and poisoned thousands more. The plant was jointly owned by Union Carbide Corporation, now Dow Chemicals, and the Indian government, and run by local Indian management. Burson-Marsteller consultants were brought in by Union Carbide to organize communications following the leak and provide advice to Union Carbide executives. The company set up an information center to provide information to the media and help to transmit news from the remote location to newspaper, TV and radio outlets, and facilitate daily press conferences that reported on steps taken following the accident. Under advice from the consultants and corporate lawyers, Union Carbide CEO Warren Anderson traveled to Bhopal where he was placed in custody by the Indian government. Anderson posted bail, returned to the United States, and refused to return to India. He was declared a fugitive from justice by the Chief Judicial Magistrate of Bhopal on February 1, 1992, for failing to appear at the court hearings in a culpable homicide case in which he was named the chief defendant. While his visit to India several days after the leak was viewed positively by the media and other corporations and brought attention to Union Carbide's actions in showing its concern for what had happened in Bhopal it did not deflect criticism of Union Carbide for cutting costs on safety measures. While Burson-Marsteller has been criticized for its involvement with Union Carbide, Harold Burson has stated that he is proud of the company's work in helping the media cover the story.

==== Other cases ====
When the Three Mile Island accident of 1979 became the biggest accident in the history of U.S. commercial nuclear power, Burson-Marsteller conducted public relations work for Babcock & Wilcox, the plant's manufacturer.

The company organized a campaign for Egypt's Ministry of Tourism following terrorist attacks on tourists in 1993. That campaign focused on Western Europe and the United States, and featured TV commercials and other media coverage of new archeological discoveries and the role of Egypt in the Middle East.

Blackwater USA, the private military contractor, hired Burson-Marsteller subsidiary BKSH to help founder Erik Prince prepare for a congressional hearing in 2007. In September of that year, Blackwater guards were involved in a shooting in Baghdad in which 13 Iraqis were killed. Blackwater faced a great deal of negative publicity and Prince was asked to testify before the Committee on Oversight and Government Reform.

=== Corporate PR ===
Burson-Marsteller's second-largest practice was its Corporate and Financial Communications group. The company's corporate PR practice focused on four specialties: corporate brand positioning, financial communications, organizational performance, and C-suite positioning. One of the agency's longstanding corporate clients was the Saudi Arabia Basic Industries Corporation (SABIC). The company began working with the petrochemical producer in the late 1970s when they first entered the market in the Middle East. Other corporate clients have included Huawei, Procter and Gamble, British Gas Plc, Philips, Unilever, Du Pont, Coca-Cola, GlaxoSmithKline, Merrill Lynch, General Electric, Monsanto, the Federal Communications Commission, and Colgate-Palmolive.

=== Technology ===
Burson-Marsteller established a technology group in its New York office in the early 1980s, specializing in "high-tech PR services". The company's technology practice expanded rapidly over the 1990s, with major clients including Apple, Sun Microsystems and Qualcomm and its headquarters moved to Silicon Valley in the late 1990s. The practice focused on public relations for technology companies and organizations using technology as a key part of their business. Clients included HP, Intel and business software corporation SAP AG.

=== Public affairs ===
Within Burson-Marsteller's public affairs practice, the company specialized in public relations and communications for government and corporate clients. Public affairs clients included the U.S. Bureau of Engraving and Printing, the Hebrides Range Task Force, for whose campaign Burson-Marsteller won several awards in 2010, South Korea, including representation of the Seoul Olympics Organizing Committee in the late 1980s, and the Brazilian government tourism agency. The company received awards for its public affairs work, including an award for the Europe/Middle East/Africa public affairs agency of the year at the 2009/10 SABRE awards, the world's largest awards competition for the public relations industry, and a Silver Anvil from the Public Relations Society of America in 2004 for their work for the Bureau of Engraving and Printing.

==== Romania ====
Burson-Marsteller represented the Romanian government in the early 1970s, when the country gained Most Favored Nation status for trade with the United States. At the time the United States and other western nations regarded Romania's president Nicolae Ceauşescu as the friendliest of the Soviet bloc leaders to their interests. U.S. President Nixon visited Ceauşescu in Bucharest in 1969, which he viewed as a diplomatic opportunity to gain access to China, and later the Romanian dictator was said to be instrumental in arranging Nixon's visit to China. Burson-Marsteller was brought in by the Romanian government to promote trade and tourism for Romania; one result was a week-long visit to the country by NBC's Today program.

==== Indonesia ====
Following the 1991 Santa Cruz massacre of East Timor protesters by occupying Indonesian forces, the Indonesian government retained Burson-Marsteller "to help improve the country's human rights and environmental image", according to the Far Eastern Economic Review. Another contract was signed in 1996. The company was retained in total from 1992 to 1998. Over the six years that the company worked for the country's government, Burson-Marsteller promoted Indonesia's trade opportunities to encourage foreign investment and aided the country in its attempts to improve its human rights image.

==== Argentina ====
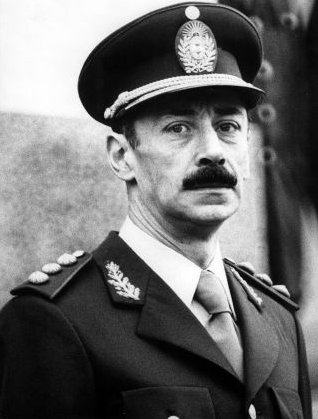
General Jorge Rafael Videla

Burson-Marsteller carried out public relations work for the last Argentine military dictatorship (1976–1983), for which it received criticism. In doing so the company produced press kits and direct mailings, arranged for journalists to visit Argentina, and held lunches with business groups and financial seminars.

For years, Burson-Marsteller denied working directly with the Argentine military, stating they only worked for the Ministry of Economics to assist in economic development. Later on, Burson-Marsteller admitted to working with the dictator to improve the nation's image.

At that time, human rights organizations were denouncing state crimes against humanity, including forced disappearances and torture that were taking place in what later became known as the Dirty War. Burson-Marsteller maintained that it was not asked to defend Human Rights Violations; however, researcher Rubén Morales wrote that the company created a slogan to coincide with the September 1979 Inter-American Commission on Human Rights' fact-finding visit which stated in its English translation, "We Argentines are right and humane". The quotes are drawn from a 1996 interview by Marguerite Feitlowitz. In her account of that interview, Feitlowitz describes Emmanuel replying to a point about kidnappings and secret camps: "It was arguably almost necessary."

Feitlowitz describes an initial 33-page report completed under Emmanuel's supervision as echoing the regime's language, referencing, for example, "well-financed subversion campaigns of international origin." The report outlined three target groups for their campaign: "those who influence thinking," "those who influence travel," and "those who influence investment." She goes on to write:

Journalists, they knew, would be the toughest customers. "[Many] consider the Argentine government oppressive and repressive, a dictatorial military institution which deserves little more than condemnation." So prominent reporters got special attention, in the hopes that they would "help build a system of conduits in the leading newspapers and magazines [in the West]. Linked to this was a negative campaign aimed at ... individuals and reporters singled out by [Argentine magazine] Para Ti.

Burson-Marsteller placed an advertising supplement in The New York Times Magazine in 1979; according to Emmanuel, content was probably supplied by the Argentine finance minister. A more extensive 31-page supplement ran in Business Week the next July. Evidence from Wikileaks revealed in 2013 that Burson-Marsteller pressured the Associated Press to publish an article with an American executive mentioning their support for the regime in 1976.

According to Feitlowitz, Argentine dictator Jorge Videla renewed Burson-Marsteller's contract twice.

==== Ukraine ====
In 2012, Burson-Marsteller was hired by Ukraine's ruling Party of Regions (PoR), "to help the PoR communicate its activities as the governing party of Ukraine, as well as to help it explain better its position on the Yulia Tymoshenko case", as explained by Robert Mack, a senior manager at Burson-Marsteller.

The tasks of the PR company included setting up press interviews for Ukraine's deputy prosecutor general, Renat Kuzmin, during his visits in Brussels. Martin Nunn, a British national who ran a PR firm in Kyiv, said he wrote to the UK's Crown Prosecution Service to ask if Burson-Marsteller was in violation of the UK bribery act as Kuzmin was possibly receiving a PR benefit as a gift from the PoR. In response, Burson-Marsteller noted, “The deputy prosecutor general is a logical person to speak about the facts surrounding the Tymoshenko case.”

The public relations contract coincided with a government campaign against former prime minister Yulia Tymoshenko, detained in a penal colony, and whose case had been top in the agenda of Ukraine–European Union relations, delaying the signature of a DCFTA and Association Agreement between the two.

==== Turkey ====
In May 2017, shortly before clashes at the Turkish Ambassador's Residence in Washington, D.C., the Turkish administration of Recep Tayyip Erdoğan became a client of the agency. An inquiry by journalists of Der Spiegel regarding the hiring by the Turkish government remained unanswered by Burson-Marsteller.

=== Healthcare ===
Burson-Marsteller established its Healthcare practice in the 1980s and by the early 1990s was listed as the top-ranked healthcare PR firm by O'Dwyer's PR Services Report. The company's healthcare practice provided public relations and communications for clients in pharmaceutical, biotechnology, healthcare provider, policy, nutrition, cosmetics and consumer health markets. Significant campaigns undertaken by the practice have included a campaign launching the first biotechnology firm and also the organization of the first National Breast Cancer Awareness Month. Notable clients included AstraZeneca, Allergan, Wyeth, Schering-Plough, Sandoz, and Bristol-Myers Squibb. Burson-Marsteller won a number of international awards for campaigns by its healthcare practice, including a Platinum PR Award for its 2002 National Breast Cancer Awareness Month campaign.

=== Google smear campaign ===
It became public knowledge that Burson-Marsteller had been soliciting negative articles about Google's privacy practices after security researcher Christopher Soghoian re-posted a pitch he received from a company representative. Other influential outlets, including USA Today, confirmed that they had received similar pitches and even offers for help in writing article content. It was soon discovered by The Daily Beast that Google-competitor Facebook had hired the firm to promote press coverage critical of Google's practices, although the firm did not initially divulge to writers who had paid for their services. This was confirmed by Facebook itself shortly after.

Two former reporters who had been hired by Burson-Marsteller helped in what became known as the "whisper campaign" against Google. John Mercurio and Jim Goldman, both former journalists, brought attention to Google Social Circle, pushing negative commentary about Google on broadcast and in print media. Mercurio and Goldman claimed the new program from Google violated users' privacy and that it used information gathered by Facebook.

Burson-Marsteller admitted its role in the campaign, and claimed to have parted ways with Facebook.

=== Brand marketing ===
Burson-Marsteller's brand marketing practice included consumer lifestyle communications and brand communications across a range of markets. Notable campaigns by the practice included the launch of Segway and brand marketing for Old Navy.

== Cohn and Wolfe ==
=== History ===
Cohn & Wolfe was a global communications & public relations firm. In 1984, Burson-Marsteller acquired the Atlanta-based public relations firm, and it operated as a subsidiary of Burson-Marsteller until 2000. It was part of Young & Rubicam and then also a part of WPP. In 2018, it merged with Burson-Marsteller. It was founded by Bob Cohn and Norman Wolfe in Atlanta, Georgia, in 1970.

In 1999, the firm managed the campaign for Paxil, a drug produced by GlaxoSmithKline. The firm also ran a publicity campaign on social anxiety disorder, which made Paxil the world's top-selling antidepressant.

== Hill & Knowlton ==
For more information see Hill & Knowlton.

Hill & Knowlton was an American global public relations consulting company. In 2024, it merged with Burson Cohn & Wolfe, forming the new agency, Burson.

== Subsidiaries and affiliates ==
Burson operates a number of subsidiary companies, including grassroots marketing consultancy Direct Impact, government affairs and lobbying firm Prime Policy Group, and strategic communications consultancy PivotRED. In addition to these subsidiary companies, Burson also has a large number of affiliates, with partners in 60 countries and 70 affiliate offices worldwide. Among them, Burson has formed strategic partnerships with firms inside the United States, including Targeted Victory, a political and advocacy consultancy, and also international firms including Mikhailov and Partners in Russia and Engage Burson-Marsteller in the Dominican Republic.

== See also ==
- Bob Leaf, International chairman
- Perception management
