= Martin B. Gold =

American Lawyer

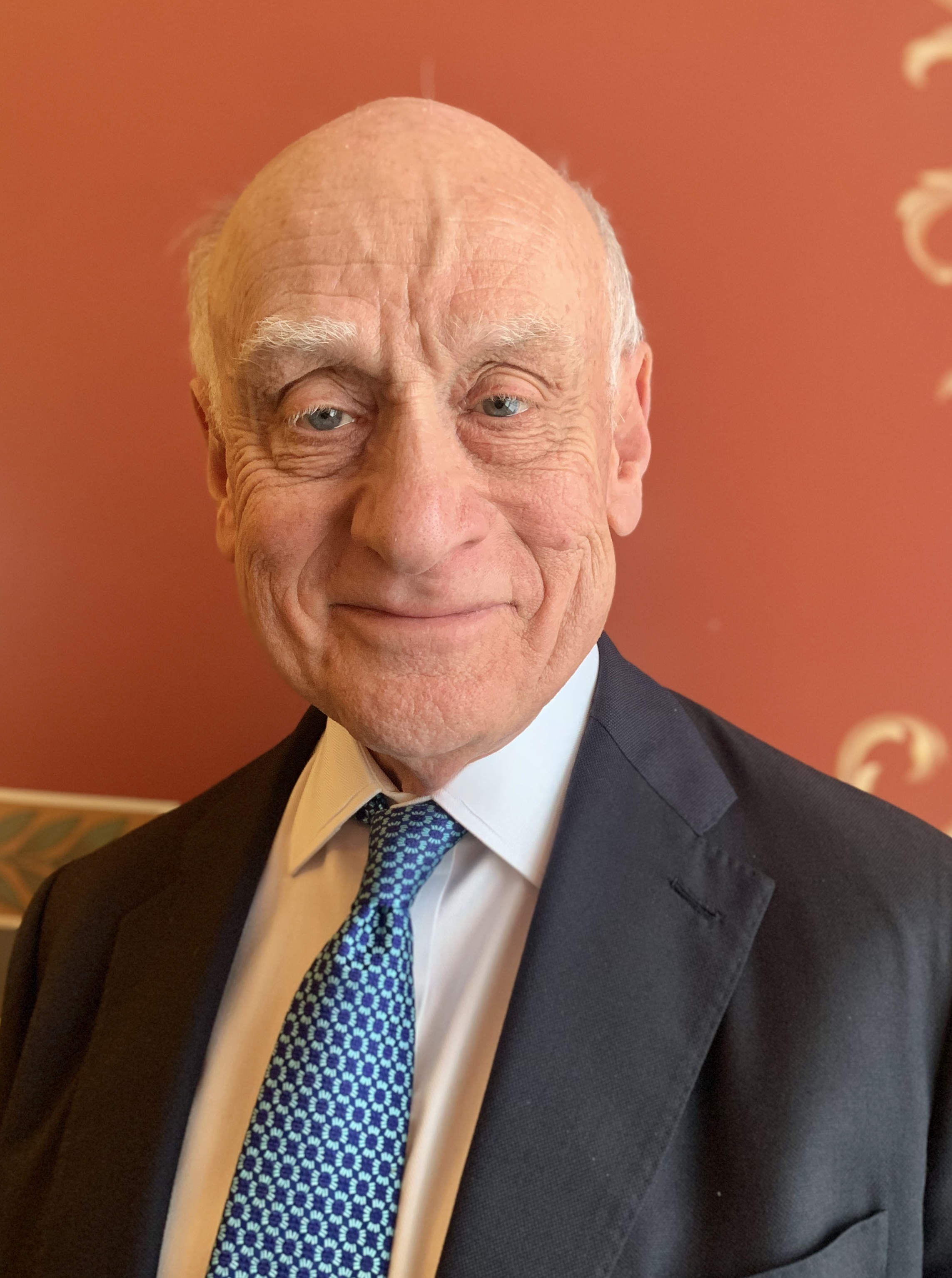
- Born: 1947
- Occupation: Lawyer
- Employer: George Washington University College of Professional Studies
- Awards: Asian/Pacific American Awards for Literature (2, 2012)

Martin B. Gold (born 1947 in New York City, United States) is a partner in Capitol Counsel's Washington, D.C. office and is a member of the United States Commission for the Preservation of America's Heritage Abroad.

Gold gained legislative experience in his time as counsel to former Senate Majority Leaders Bill Frist and Howard Baker and counsel to former Senator Mark O. Hatfield, the Senate Select Committee on Intelligence and the Senate Committee on Rules and Administration]. He was also founder of Gold & Liebengood and the Legislative Strategies Group, two leading Washington lobbying firms.

He has lectured at the Russian Federal Assembly, the Parliament of Ukraine, Moscow State University, the Russian Foreign Service Institute and before numerous domestic university audiences on American political developments and the parliamentary processes of the United States Congress. He has also lectured at the Beijing Foreign Studies University and at Tsinghua University. Gold is a member of the Adjunct Faculty at the George Washington University Graduate School of Political Management. In 2006, on the recommendation of the president pro tempore of the United States Senate, President George W. Bush appointed him to serve on the US Commission for the Preservation of America's Heritage Abroad.

In 2012, Gold received an Honor from the Asian/Pacific American Awards for Literature in the non-fiction adult book category for his book Forbidden citizens : Chinese exclusion and the U.S. Congress : a legislative history.

Martin B. Gold was elected to the Cosmos Club in Washington DC, for distinction in the field of public affairs.

Martin B. Gold is married to Celeste Gold, whom he married in 2003.

== Honors ==
- Recognized by The Washingtonian as "One [of] the Top 50 Lobbyists" (2007).

== Publications ==
- ”Crosscurrents: U.S. Relations with Nationalist China 1943-1960”, Lexington Books (2023)
- ”The Twenty-second Amendment and the Limits of Presidential Tenure: A Tradition Restored”, Lexington Books (2020)
- A Legislative History of the Taiwan Relations Act: Bridging the Strait, Lexington Books (2017)
- Forbidden Citizens: Chinese Exclusion and the U.S. Congress, A Legislative History, TheCapitol.Net (2012)
- Government Affairs Post-Election Analysis Covington Post-Election Conference Call (11/10/2006)
- Senate Procedure and Practice, Rowman and Littlefield Publishers, Inc. (2004) (2008) (2013)
- The Constitutional Option: A Majoritarian Means to Override the Filibuster, 28 Harvard Journal of Law & Public Policy 205 (2004)
- The Book on Congress, A Compendium of House and Senate Procedures, Contributor (1992)
