= List of Saint Joseph's University people =

This is a list of notable alumni, faculty, and benefactors of the Saint Joseph's University.

== Notable alumni ==
=== Politics, law, and activism ===
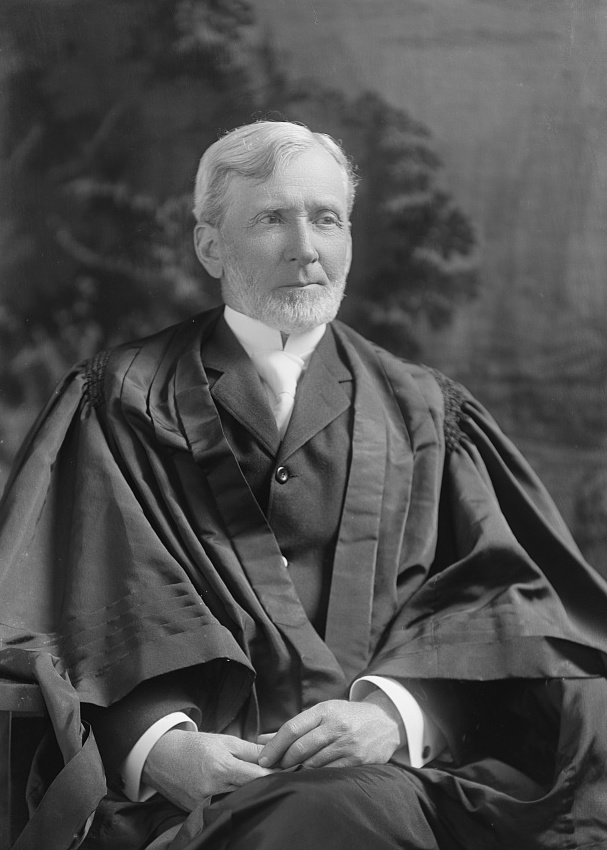
Joseph McKenna, former associate justice of the Supreme Court of the United States

- William A. Barrett – former U.S. representative (D-PA)
- Melissa Brown – ophthalmologist; three-time candidate for the U.S. House of Representatives (R-PA)
- E. James Burke – chief justice of the Wyoming Supreme Court
- William T. Cahill – six-term U.S. representative (R-NJ); 46th governor of New Jersey
- Frank Cassidy – former U.S. Federal Housing Commissioner and Assistant Secretary for Housing
- John Caulfield – chief of Mission Havana Cuba
- Ken Croken – member of the Iowa House of Representatives (2023–present)
- Charles F. Dougherty – two-term U.S. representative (R-PA)
- Kevin M. Downing – attorney for Miller and Chevalier; former prosecutor with the Department of Justice Tax Division handling the KPMG tax shelter fraud and UBS tax evasion scandal
- Charles J. Dunlap, Jr. – deputy Judge Advocate General, Headquarters United States Air Force, Washington, D.C.
- Joseph T. English, chief psychiatrist of the United States Peace Corps, administrator of the Health Services and Mental Health Administration in the United States Department of Health, Education, and Welfare, and the founding president of the New York City Health and Hospitals Corporation (HHC)
- Clare G. Fenerty – former U.S. representative from Pennsylvania
- Thomas M. Foglietta – former U.S. representative; U.S. ambassador to Italy
- William J. Green, III – former U.S. representative; former mayor of Philadelphia
- Richard J. Hughes – former governor of New Jersey; former chief justice of the New Jersey Supreme Court; chairman of the Credentials Committee, 1968 Democratic National Convention
- George R. Johnson – Pennsylvania state representative for the 166th district (1967–1972)
- Ronald T. Kadish – lieutenant general, United States Air Force; former director of the Ballistic Missile Defense Organization and the Missile Defense Agency
- John F. Lehman – secretary of the Navy under President Ronald Reagan, author, and member of the 9/11 Commission
- Frank LoBiondo – U.S. representative (R-NJ)
- Thomas McCreesh – Pennsylvania state senator for the 4th district 1959–1968 and the 8th district 1969–1974
- Kathleen McGinty – secretary, Pennsylvania Department of Environmental Protection; former advisor to Al Gore and Barack Obama
- Joseph McKenna – former associate justice of the United States Supreme Court
- Nicholas Micozzie – Pennsylvania state representative for the 163rd district (1979–2014)
- Francis J. Myers – Pennsylvania state senator; U.S. representative (D-PA)
- Drew O'Keefe – U.S. attorney for the Eastern District of Pennsylvania
- Michael O'Pake – Democratic Pennsylvania state senator, 11th Senatorial District
- Lawrence W. Pierce – lawyer, federal judge
- Dominic Pileggi – Republican Leader of the Pennsylvania State Senate
- Francis R. Smith – former U.S. representative (D-PA)
- Charles A. Waters – Pennsylvania state treasurer, auditor general, and judge

=== Business ===
- Chris Gheysens (MBA 2005) – president and chief executive officer of Wawa Inc.
- Daniel J. Hilferty III – president and CEO of Independence Blue Cross
- Keith Leaphart – entrepreneur, philanthropist and physician
- Sister Mary Scullion – co-founder and executive director, Project H.O.M.E.
- Andrew von Eschenbach – acting chairman of FDA; former director of the National Cancer Institute; director at BioTime, a biotechnology company

=== Religion ===
- Rev. William J. Byron, S.J. – priest of the Society of Jesus; former president of The Catholic University of America and the University of Scranton
- John Patrick Cardinal Foley – Grand Master of the Order of the Holy Sepulchre
- David Hollenbach, S.J. – director of the Center for Human Rights and International Justice at Boston College

=== Athletics ===
- Cliff Anderson – former NBA player for Los Angeles Lakers, Cleveland Cavaliers, Philadelphia 76ers
- Mike Bantom – former NBA player for Phoenix Suns, Seattle SuperSonics, New Jersey Nets, Indiana Pacers, and Philadelphia 76ers; silver medalist with U.S. team in 1972 Summer Olympics
- DeAndre' Bembry – NBA player for Atlanta Hawks, first-round selection in 2016 NBA draft
- Debbie Black – former player for Connecticut Sun of WNBA; assistant coach, Ohio State University's women's basketball team
- Norman Black – former CBA player for Lancaster Red Roses, NBA player for Detroit Pistons and PBA player
- Pat Calathes – pro basketball player (VTB United League; Israel Basketball Premier League)
- Brett Callahan - MLB player for the Detroit Tigers
- Pat Carroll – SJU and professional basketball player
- Natasha Cloud – WNBA player for Washington Mystics and Phoenix Mercury
- Bill Cubit – football coach, former head coach at University of Illinois, Widener and Western Michigan
- James "Bruiser" Flint – SJU basketball player, assistant coach at Indiana, former head coach of UMass and Drexel University
- Langston Galloway – NBA player for New York Knicks, New Orleans Pelicans, Sacramento Kings, Detroit Pistons
- Matt Guokas – former NBA player; head coach of Philadelphia 76ers and Orlando Magic; television broadcaster
- Matt Guokas, Sr. – player for NBA's Philadelphia Warriors; broadcast games for NFL's Philadelphia Eagles for over 30 years
- Gerald Hunsicker – executive with Major League Baseball's Tampa Bay Rays; former general manager of New York Mets and Houston Astros
- Dwayne Jones – professional basketball player
- Joe Lunardi – ESPN college basketball analyst and creator of bracketology
- Jim Lynam – former NBA head coach of San Diego/Los Angeles Clippers, Philadelphia 76ers, Washington Bullets and head coach of American University, Fairfield and SJU
- Ann "Muffet" McGraw – former basketball player at SJU; women's basketball coach at Notre Dame
- Jack McKinney – former NBA head coach of Los Angeles Lakers, Indiana Pacers (1981 Coach of the Year), and Kansas City Kings
- Isaiah Miles (born 1994) – basketball player in the Israeli Basketball Premier League
- Jamie Moyer – former professional pitcher for Major League Baseball's Philadelphia Phillies and Seattle Mariners; member of Phillies' broadcast team
- Jameer Nelson – 2004 Naismith College Player of the Year; NBA guard for Denver Nuggets
- Ahmad Nivins – professional basketball player
- Jim O'Brien – former head coach of NBA's Indiana Pacers, Philadelphia 76ers and Boston Celtics
- Vince Papale – former professional football player for Philadelphia Eagles and inspiration for Disney movie Invincible
- William Warren Phillips, aka "Bill Phillips" – professional basketball player
- Jack Ramsay – Hall of Fame basketball coach; former NBA head coach of Philadelphia 76ers, Buffalo Braves, Portland Trail Blazers, and Indiana Pacers
- Ronald Roberts – former power forward for Philadelphia 76ers
- George Senesky – former NBA player; championship-winning coach
- Mike Teti – three-time Olympic rower; 12-time national team member; former USRowing men's coach (1997–2008); current University of California, Berkeley coach; three-time Olympic coach (1996 – MLW4-, 2000 – M8+, 2004 – M8+)
- Delonte West – NBA guard, Dallas Mavericks, Cleveland Cavaliers, Boston Celtics
- Paul Westhead – former NBA head coach for Los Angeles Lakers, Chicago Bulls, and Denver Nuggets; WNBA head coach for Phoenix Mercury, former head coach for Loyola Marymount University
- Jack Whitaker – Emmy award-winning sports broadcaster, CBS and ABC
- Chazz Witherspoon – professional heavyweight boxer

=== Arts, entertainment, and media ===
- Joseph Ignatius Breen – film censor
- Kevin Brennan – former Saturday Night Live writer and comedian
- Glenn Brenner – Washington, D.C, sportscasting legend for WUSA-TV
- Richard Corliss – writer and editor, focuses on film
- Tim Martin Gleason – actor, singer
- Jeanne Marie Laskas – columnist, journalist, and book author
- Gregg Murphy – Emmy Award-winning journalist for CN8, specializes in sports
- Joe Queenan – author, critic, and humorist
- Lee Tilghman – former wellness influencer

=== Education ===
- William J. Byron, S.J. – Jesuit; former president of the University of Scranton (1975–82); former president of Catholic University of America (1982–92); former interim president of Loyola University New Orleans (2003–04); former president of St. Joseph's Preparatory School (2006–08); current professor of business and society at Saint Joseph's University
- Emile B. De Sauzé – language educator noted for developing the conversational method of learning a language
- Patrick Maggitti – first provost of Villanova University and former dean of the Villanova School of Business
- Peter J. Woolley – political scientist, author, founding director of the opinion research group PublicMind

== President ==
Saint Joseph's University was technically without a president for a period of months, with Senior Vice President John Smithson serving as interim president. He took on the role when the university's 26th president, Rev. Timothy R. Lannon, S.J., stepped down to assume the presidency at his own alma mater, Creighton University.

On January 24, 2011, the board of trustees elected Rev. Joseph M. O'Keefe, S.J. as the 27th president of the university. He later stepped down, citing health issues; the university subsequently selected Smithson, a former chair of the board of trustees, to serve as interim president, and directed its efforts to a Jesuit-only search. Under Smithson, the university began taking steps to complete its Plan 2020: Gateway to the Future.

On November 10, 2011, the university's board of trustees announced that it had selected Rev. C. Kevin Gillespie, S.J., Associate Provost of University Centers at Loyola University Chicago, as the 27th president of the university. Gillespie is a member of the Class of 1972 and had served as a trustee since 2006. He is only the second president to also be an alumnus of the university; the first was Rev. Cornelius Gillespie, S.J., who served from 1900 to 1907, and again from 1908 to 1909. Gillespie was formally presented at a reception on November 11, 2011, and formally assumed the presidency on July 1, 2012. Until that time, the university announced that John Smithson would continue his role as interim president.

== Coaches ==
- Ian Crookenden – men's tennis coach
- Don D'Ambra – men's soccer coach
- Steve Donahue – men's basketball coach
- Fritz Hamburg – men's baseball coach

== Notable faculty ==
- Joe Lunardi – ESPN bracketologist
