= NCAA basketball tournament selection process =

American collegiate basketball tournament process

The selection process for college basketball's NCAA Division I Men's and Women's Basketball Tournaments determine which teams (68 men's and 68 women's) will enter the tournaments (the centerpieces of the basketball championship known as "March Madness") and their seedings and matchups in the knockout bracket. Currently, thirty-one (31) teams gain automatic entry through winning their conference's championship. The remaining teams (37 men's, 37 women's) rely on the selection committee to award them an at-large bid in the tournament. The selection process primarily takes place on Selection Sunday and the days leading up to it. Selection Sunday is also when the men's brackets and seeds are released to the public. Beginning in 2022, the women's championship brackets and seeds are also announced on Sunday. Prior to the expansion of the bracket from 64 to 68 teams, the women's championship brackets and seeds were announced one day later, on Selection Monday.

== The selection committees ==
The twelve-member basketball selection committee is made up of athletic directors and conference commissioners throughout Division I men's and women's athletics with separate committees for the men's and women's tournaments. The committees consist of one member selected from each of the five autonomy conferences and three members selected from the seven highest-ranked nonautonomy conferences based on basketball success. The remaining four members are selected from the 20 other conferences. All appointments are for five years. Historically the men's selection committee consisted of all men, and the women's selection committee consisted of all women. However, recently women have been serving on the men's committee (including Judy Rose, Lynn Hickey, Janet Cone, and current member Bernadette McGlade), and men have been serving on the women's committee (including Richard Ensor and current member Jeff Konya). The tournament selection is only part of the committee members' duties; the panels meet year-round (in-person or through conference calls) to discuss the tournament and its administration, evaluate teams, assign tournament game officials, and determine future tournament sites.

To avoid potential conflicts of interest, committee members must leave the room when their own school is being discussed (or schools in the case of the conference commissioners). The member may be invited to answer factual questions regarding their team or teams (e.g., status of player injuries). Athletic directors may be present when other schools from their conference are discussed, but may only speak if asked.

=== Current men's committee members ===
Name	School/Conference	Position
Keith Gill^{฿}	Sun Belt Conference	Commissioner
Martin Newton^{฿}	Samford	Athletic Director
Lee Reed	Georgetown	Athletic Director
Arthur Johnson	Temple	Athletic Director
John Wildhack	Syracuse	Athletic Director
Chad Weiberg	Oklahoma State	Athletic Director
Stu Jackson	West Coast Conference	Commissioner
Mark Coyle	Minnesota	Athletic Director
Tom Wistrcill	Big Sky Conference	Commissioner
Greg Byrne	Alabama	Athletic Director
Irma Garcia	Manhattan	Athletic Director
Zack Lassiter	Abilene Christian	Athletic Director

^{₳}current chairman
^{฿}current vice-chairman

=== Current women's committee members ===
Name	School/Conference	Position
Nina King ^{₳}	Duke	Vice President and Director of Athletics
Beth Goetz ^{฿}	Iowa	Athletic Director
Deneé Barracato	Northwestern	Deputy Director of Athletics
Amanda Braun	Milwaukee	Athletic Director
Greg Burke	Northwestern State	Athletic Director
Kurt McGuffin	UT Martin	Athletic Director
Lisa Peterson	Oregon	Deputy Director of Athletics
Derita Ratcliffe Dawkins	Arkansas	Deputy Director of Athletics
Janice Ruggiero	New Mexico	Deputy Director of Athletics and Senior Woman Administrator
Jill Shields	Kansas State	Deputy Athletics Director
Lynn Tighe	Villanova	Senior Associate Athletics Director and Senior Woman Administrator

^{₳}current chairman
^{฿}current vice-chairman

== Selecting the field ==
The selection committee must first decide which teams will compete in the tournament. As of the 2024–25 season, thirty-one teams receive automatic bids to the tournament by winning their conference tournament. (Note: Prior to the 2016–17 season, some conferences did not hold a postseason tournament, thus the regular season champion of such conferences was awarded the automatic bid to the NCAA tournament. For example, the Ivy League did not have a postseason tournament until the 2016–17 season, and the Big Ten did not have a postseason tournament until the 1997–98 season.)

The selection committee only selects the teams (37 for men and women) who receive at-large bids. Though each conference receives only one automatic bid, the selection committee may select any number of at-large teams from each conference. The at-large teams generally come from college basketball's top conferences, including the ACC, Big 12, Big East, Big Ten, SEC and to a lesser extent, the American, A-10, Mountain West and WCC. Many of these at-large teams, however, are "on the bubble", meaning that their chances of gaining a tournament berth are borderline, and they will not know if they have gained entry until the Selection Sunday bracket announcements.

Through the 2018 men's tournament and 2019 women's tournament, (Note: The RPI would have been used in the 2020 women's tournament, but that event was canceled due to the COVID-19 pandemic.) the RPI rating was often considered a factor in selecting and seeding the final few teams in the tournament field. However, the NCAA selection committee in 2015 said the RPI was only utilized for grouping the teams into groups such as top 50 and top 100 teams, to value the wins and losses, and not as a factor for selection. Additionally, the committee officially considers predictive computer rankings, such as ESPN's BPI, Sagarin, and Pomeroy Ratings, which use additional factors considered by the committee, such as injured players in the case of the BPI. Additionally, committee members consider how teams do on the road and at neutral courts, strength of conference and schedule, non-conference strength of schedule, record against other selected tournament teams, and other extenuating factors. Finally, the "eye test" is often quoted by pundits as something the committee uses, however ncaa.org's sparse description of the selection process doesn't officially mention the "eye test". For instance, in 2016 Oklahoma athletic director Joe Castiglione, the NCAA selection committee's chair, said that the stark contrast in Syracuse's performance in 2015–2016 with Jim Boeheim present versus absent was considered the same as missing a key player during the slump.

A number of teams are assured an at-large berth no matter their performance in their conference tournament. Most teams in the Top 25 in the national polls or RPI are essentially guaranteed at-large berths even if they do not win their respective conference tournaments. However, teams that have been ranked heading into Selection Sunday but didn't win a weaker conference's tournament have been essentially penalized (or "snubbed") by the selection committee despite computer rankings or public opinion. One example was Utah State in 2004, when Utah State completed the regular season with a record of 25–2 but was snubbed after losing in their conference tournament, even though they were ranked in the polls. The factors in their snub were the soft non-conference schedule which included Mountain West Conference foes BYU (close home win) and Utah (road loss) as well as the road loss to Pacific on February 14, 2004. Pacific went on to earn the Big West Conference's automatic berth and advanced to the 2nd round of the 2004 tournament.

The committee also selects four additional teams, the "First Four Out", who do not qualify for the tournament. Since 2015, the NCAA has placed the "First Four Out" from the men's field as the top seeds in the National Invitation Tournament. The NCAA carried this policy over to the inaugural Women's Basketball Invitation Tournament in 2024.

During the 2018 offseason, the NCAA announced that the RPI would no longer be used in the selection process for the Division I men's tournament. The RPI has been replaced by the NCAA Evaluation Tool (NET), a new metric that includes the following input data:

- Game results
- Strength of schedule
- Location (home, away, or neutral site)
- Scoring margin — Teams receive no added credit for victory margins above 10 points. Additionally, overtime games will be assigned a scoring margin of 1 point, regardless of the actual score.
- Net offensive and defensive efficiency
- All games will be evaluated equally; there is no bonus or penalty for when a game is played within the season.
- Quality of wins and losses — The NCAA continues to use its "quadrant" system, introduced for the 2018 tournament selection process, to classify individual wins and losses. Quadrants are classified as follows, based on the location of the game with respect to the team under consideration and the ranking of its opponent in the NET as follows:

Quadrant	Home	Neutral site	Away
1	1–30	1–50	1–75
2	31–75	51–100	76–135
3	76–160	101–200	136–240
4	161–353	201–353	241–353

The NET was initially adopted only for men's basketball. Starting with the 2020–21 season, the NCAA Division I women's basketball tournament also began using the NET. The women's NET uses input data exclusively from the women's game, but otherwise operates identically to the men's version. All other sports that use selection committees to determine NCAA tournament entries, continue to use their own versions of the RPI, as the Division I women's basketball tournament had done prior to 2020–2021.

== Predictions and speculation ==
While the selection committee assembles to do the official work, many predictions are made by various people and organizations. Speculations and buzz can come from anywhere from random college basketball fans to senior bracketologists and experts on the selection process and the seedings, such as ESPN's Joe Lunardi. Other well-known experts in this field include Ken Pomeroy of kenpom.com, Jerry Palm of CBSSports.com, Gary Parrish of CBSSports.com, and Dean Oliver of ESPN's BPI. The ESPN's BPI also considers injured key players, which is also considered by the NCAA selection committee.

Bracketology is conducted extensively for the men's tournament, although a few bracketologists also make projected brackets for the women's tournament, the most prominent being Charlie Creme's weekly projections on ESPN.com.

== Seeding ==
The selection committee's work to seed the teams is just as vital as their work to select the at-large teams. While the selection process starts before the seeding process, the two often overlap. Some conference tournaments do not finish until Selection Sunday itself, and there is only one hour between the end of the last game (usually the Big Ten tournament championship game) and when the brackets are officially unveiled, so the committee cannot wait until after all the games are played to start determining the seeds. While nothing is set in stone until after all the games are played and the brackets are established, the committee may have a good idea of where a team is and where they could rise or fall to depending on their showing in the later stages of their conference tournament.

Though the brackets only feature the seed numbers 1-16 in each region, the committee first assembles a overall seed ranking of selected team from 1 through 68, formatted as an "S-curve". The selection committee uses a number of factors to rank teams for the S-curve, including record, strength of schedule, and the NET in the Division I men's tournament and the RPI in all other championship tournaments. Relative subjective comparison of individual teams close on the S-Curve are also considered.

The "S-curve" table in the guidelines displays four teams to a row, alternating left-to-right and right-to left. In theory, the teams 1-4 on the seed list will all be #1 seeds in their regions (the #1 "seed line"), 5-8 will be #2 seeds in their regions (the #2 seed line), and so on; however, bracketing rules allow minor deviation from this when necessary to meet other bracketing requirements. (Also, the teams in the "first four" teams that share a seed number place lower table rows out of sync with seed numbering.)

The S-curve rankings are most important for keeping each region balanced, the ideal being that each region will be equally strong. Theoretically the committee would try to ensure that the number 1 team on the seed list, the national #1 seed, will be in the same region as the weakest #2 seed (and they are not permitted to put them with the strongest #2 seed, #5 overall).

The committee tries to ensure that the top four seeds in each region are comparable to the top four teams in every other region. For example, if one region has the best #1 seed (#1 overall), the weakest #2 seed (#8 overall), the best #3 seed (#9 overall), and the weakest #4 seed (#16 overall), its seeds add up to 34, the ideal number. But if a region has the best team for every given seed, its seeds would add up to 28, and a region with the weakest team in every seed would add up to 40, making the two regions very unbalanced. Guidelines intend for these totals to vary by five or less.

This balance extends to the national semi-finals, where the regions containing the national #1 and #4 seeds meet in one game and regions containing the national #2 and #3 seeds are in the other game.

It is extremely unusual that an at-large bid can be lower than a #12 seed, but it has occurred, most recently with BYU and Iona being #14 seeds in the 2012 Tournament, and Boise State and La Salle as #13 seeds in 2013. While the seeds are almost never perfectly balanced throughout the four regions, the committee strives to ensure that they differ from each other by only a few points. The process is identical for the women's tournament.

== Making the brackets ==
Once the S-curve is established, the committee must place the teams throughout the four regions. They were originally referred to as East, Mideast, Midwest, and West. In 1985, the Mideast designation became the Southeast, and later the South Regional in 1998. The women's tournament continued to use the Mideast terminology through 2004. In 2004, the NCAA started to identify the men's regions only by the city in which the regional semifinals and finals were played, with the same change being made for the women's tournament in 2005. The NCAA reverted to the East/South/Midwest/West designations for the men's tournament starting in 2007, but continues to designate women's regionals by their cities.

Typically the cities selected will be spread throughout the country and conform roughly to the old geographic distinctions. While the regions are named for certain cities, the first and second round games are played in different cities which need not be anywhere near the regional finals. In 2005 the Austin, Texas men's regional was fed by games in Indianapolis, Indiana; Tucson, Arizona; Charlotte, North Carolina; and Worcester, Massachusetts. This is due to the "pod" system enacted before the 2002 tournament to minimize travel for as many teams as possible, especially in the early rounds. Any team may be sent to any region and any pod, although the tournament does try to keep teams, especially the top-seeded teams, closer to home. However, in 2004, Pittsburgh played its first two tournament games in Milwaukee and not in Buffalo or Columbus, cities to which it was closer. This was done to keep a lower-seeded team, the Wisconsin Badgers, close to its campus. Similarly, two east-coast teams, Maryland and Syracuse, traveled to Denver, where their opening round opponents were BYU and UTEP, both of which were geographically closer to Denver. In addition, in 2009, Kansas and West Virginia, the two higher seeds, traveled to Minneapolis to play their opponents North Dakota State and Dayton, although Dayton and North Dakota State are geographically closer to Minneapolis than Kansas and West Virginia. To make matters worse for both latter teams, Kansas City (Kansas) and Greensboro, North Carolina (West Virginia) were both 1st-2nd round sites that year.

A number of complex rules govern the seeding process, so it is not as simple as merely following the S-curve, although that is the top priority according to the NCAA's rules. Better teams have priority in remaining close to home, but no hosting institution's team can actually play at the location where the institution is hosting tournament games (generally, games are hosted on neutral courts, so this is not usually a problem). Sometimes a top team may be a short drive away from its games; in 2006 Villanova played its first and second round games in Philadelphia at an arena where they had played three games that year, one fewer than the four required for a site to be considered a "home court" for a team, and in 2002 the Pitt Panthers played their first and second round games in the city of Pittsburgh at Mellon Arena (which was not their home court after the opening of their on-campus arena).

In the women's tournament, this criterion does not apply, and a team that is hosting is automatically assigned its home arena, regardless of seed. Thus, occasionally, lower seeded teams will host games. For example, in 2006 Old Dominion, although a 10th seed, played at its home court in the first round and also would have played there in the second round had the Lady Monarchs won that game. At present, the top 16 seeds (top 4 in each region) host the first and second rounds on campus, although there have been situations where scheduling conflicts result in a lower seed hosting.

One major controversy during the 2014 women's tournament was #1 seed South Carolina being forced to make two cross-country trips for the tournament, with many charging the Gamecocks were punished as a result of a home game ban by being forced to travel to Seattle for the first two rounds in a regional Washington was hosting, and the San Francisco Bay Area where they were eliminated in the Sweet 16 in the Stanford regional. The following year, the NCAA allowed South Carolina to host its first two games, determining that since sites for the opening two rounds were (at least theoretically) determined on merit, those games were not covered by the NCAA's ban on holding its own championship events in that state (which has since been lifted after the Confederate battle flag was removed from the state capitol grounds).

Teams are spread out according to conference. In the men's tournament, and through the 2026 edition the women's tournament, the first three teams within the top 4 seeded lines selected from each conference must be placed in different regions (with a slight exception in 2014, when 11th seed play-in team Tennessee was placed in the Midwest Region with conference foe 8th seed Kentucky). When a conference has more than three teams in the tournament, the committee tries to seed the teams so that they cannot meet until the regional final. Before 2006, this was an absolute rule. However, in the summer of 2005, the NCAA changed its rules to allow intraconference matchups as early as the second round of the tournament, assuming that all measures to keep the teams apart until the regional finals have been exhausted. The NCAA was preparing for the chance that a conference would place more than eight teams in the tournament, which became a realistic possibility when the Big East, already a power conference, expanded to 16 members, with several of the new members having traditionally strong programs. The Big East placed a record eleven teams in the 2011 Tournament and nine teams in the 2012 Tournament. Although the Big East split into two leagues in 2013, the issue of conferences placing more than eight teams in the tournament remained, due to several other leagues expanding in the early 2010s (notably the ACC to 15, and the Big Ten and SEC to 14 each) and the first half of the 2020s (with the ACC and Big Ten each expanding to 18, and the Big 12 and SEC to 16 each).

The committee may move a team up or down one seed from its seed line in the S-curve in order to preserve other principles. While this may be seen as unfair in some instances, the seeding process is an inexact science anyway, and a slight move in seeding is unlikely to significantly affect the chances of any team.

Starting in 2027 for the women's tournament only, the top 16 teams in the committee's ranking will be bracketed solely by their ranking, without regard to conference affiliation.

The committee also takes into consideration other non-basketball factors. In 2003 the tournament mistakenly placed BYU, a Latter-Day Saint school which has a policy of not playing games on Sunday, into a region where the team could be forced to play on a Sunday if they advanced to regional play. The NCAA then announced that they would switch BYU's region if they won their first two games and reached the regional semifinals; since BYU did not go that far, however, no action was taken. BYU's scheduling constraint has caused seedings to shuffle around. As recently as the 2024 NCAA Tournament, the Cougars were a 6 seed despite being the 17th-ranked team, while 21st-ranked Gonzaga was a 5 seed.

For 2011, the region names were slightly adjusted based on the locations of the regionals. The Midwest and South regions were replaced with the Southeast and Southwest regions, held in New Orleans and San Antonio respectively (sites that were determined when the NCAA was using city names as regional names). The regions reverted to the previous ones in 2012.

The women's tournament collapsed the four regional sites to two starting in 2023. Each site advances two teams to the Final Four from separate brackets; the regions are numbered 1 to 4, with the number preceded by the city.

== Selection Sunday ==
Selection Sunday is the day when participants are selected, seeded, placed accordingly, and announced. Both CBS and ESPN cover the selections for the men's tournament live; ESPN also covers selections for the women's tournament live. The NCAA committee gathers to select and place 68 men's teams and 68 women's teams that secured automatic berths or are deemed worthy of an invitation to the NCAA Division I men's and women's basketball tournaments that take place in March and April. Selection Sunday is currently the Sunday before the third Thursday of March, when the first round games begin. It is never before March 11, or after March 17.

CBS has the official rights to cover the selection of the men's tournament field as they are the TV network which covers the vast majority of the tournament. (CBS held exclusive TV rights to the men's tournament from 1991 to 2010, and have shared rights with Turner Sports since 2011.) For this reason, CBS announces each bracket first, with ESPN passing on the brackets to its viewers seconds later. Both networks' coverage is augmented by discussion of the selections and predictions about how teams will fare once the tournament begins. ESPN has exclusive rights to cover the women's tournament selection announcements, as that network has sole rights to the women's tournament. Before 2006, the women's matchups were made in a selection show airing one hour before the men's matchups. However, from 2006 to 2021, the women's matchups had been announced by ESPN on Selection Monday. Beginning in 2022, owing to the addition of the First Four into the women's tournament, selections for the women are now announced Sunday evening after the men's announcement. Currently the men's announcement is scheduled for 6:00 PM ET with the women's announcement scheduled for 8:00 PM.

Both CBS and ESPN send camera crews to schools around the nation to capture the teams' (and occasionally fans') reactions during the moment when they find out what seed they received or if they made the tournament at all. Once the teams are announced, the teams and their fans begin to make game plan and travel preparations. Additionally, millions of college basketball fans begin to fill in their brackets, usually as part of March Madness pools conducted through websites, gambling-related contests, or simply through a group of family members, friends, or co-workers.

Turner Sports (through TBS) aired the Selection Show in 2018 in their first year of holding the rights to the Final Four and National Championship. Negative reaction to the network move and format changes imposed by Turner resulted in the show reverting back to CBS and its previous format the following year.
