= Sandomir =

Sandomir may refer to:

- Richard Sandomir, American journalist
- Sandomierz, a town in south-eastern Poland
