= Brad Nessler =

American sportscaster (born 1956)

- Born: Bradley Ray Nessler; June 3, 1956 (age 70); St. Charles, Minnesota, U.S.
- Education: Minnesota State University, Mankato
- Occupation: Sportscaster
- Spouse: Nancy Wilson (m. 1978)
- Children: 1

Bradley Ray Nessler (born June 3, 1956) is an American sportscaster, who currently calls college football and college basketball games for CBS Sports.

== Career ==
=== Early assignments ===
Nessler began his professional broadcasting career sharing play–by–play radio duties with Al Ciraldo on Georgia Tech basketball on WGST from 1980–81 through 1984–85 and handled the play–by–play for the Atlanta Falcons from 1982 to 1988 on WGST and WSB, before assuming the same position for the Minnesota Vikings during the 1988 and 1989 seasons. He called preseason telecasts for the Miami Dolphins for several years and has done play–by–play of ACC football and basketball telecasts for Jefferson-Pilot.

=== CBS Sports ===
From 1990 to 1992, Nessler worked for CBS Sports, calling NFL games, college football, and both men's and women's college basketball, including the first weekend of the 1991 and 1992 NCAA men's tournament. Additionally, he called speed-skating at the 1992 Winter Olympics.

=== ESPN and ABC Sports ===
Nessler's career with ESPN began in 1992 with college basketball games, as well as Big Ten and Thursday night football contests, and expanded with the addition of ABC Sports assignments in 1997.

Nessler has appeared annually as a commentator in EA Sports' NCAA Football series with Kirk Herbstreit. His voice (along with that of his broadcast partner, Dick Vitale) was featured in the EA Sports NCAA March Madness video game series.

==== College football ====
In 1997, when Nessler began calling college football for ABC, he was regarded as the #3 play-by-play man, behind Keith Jackson and Brent Musburger. He was promoted to #2 upon Jackson's scaling back to West Coast games in 1999, and then became the #1 Saturday afternoon play-by-play man from 2006 through the 2008 season. In July 2009, ESPN announced that Nessler would move to the top play-by-play man for ESPN's coverage of college football, being primarily responsible for ESPN's Saturday Primetime game airing at 7:45 PM Eastern Time.

Nessler originally worked with Gary Danielson as his college football color man when he began working for ABC in 1997, but from 1999 to 2008, called games alongside Bob Griese (who traded positions with Danielson). Starting in 2006, Paul Maguire joined Nessler and Griese as a third color commentator for the Saturday afternoon college telecasts. Upon the announcement of Nessler's move to ESPN's Saturday Primetime telecasts, it was announced that he would also be teamed with former Penn State quarterback Todd Blackledge and sideline reporter Erin Andrews beginning with the 2009 college football season; this crew called the January 1, 2010, Capital One Bowl on ABC.

==== NBA and college basketball ====
From 2002 to 2004, Nessler was a broadcaster for the NBA, including calling the 2003 NBA Finals. During this particular period, Nessler was accused (particularly by Richard Sandomir of The New York Times) of not knowing game strategy well, lacking rhythm and enthusiasm in his game call, not bringing out the best in his partners (i.e., Bill Walton and Tom Tolbert), too often ignoring the score, and tending to stammer.

Starting in 2006, Nessler had provided play-by-play for SEC games on Super Tuesday and Thursday Night Showcase, alongside Sean Farnham or Dick Vitale (and formerly Jimmy Dykes) and sideline reporter Heather Cox. He covered Saturday afternoon games for ESPN during the regular college basketball season, and previously appeared on ABC.

==== Monday Night Football ====
On September 11, 2006, ESPN began its coverage of Monday Night Football with a Week 1 doubleheader. Nessler teamed with Ron Jaworski, Dick Vermeil, and Bonnie Bernstein to call the second game, featuring the San Diego Chargers and Oakland Raiders.

On September 13, 2010, Nessler again worked a Monday Night Football game, teaming with Trent Dilfer and Suzy Kolber to call the San Diego Chargers and Kansas City Chiefs in the second game of that night's Week 1 doubleheader.

On September 12, 2011, Nessler and Dilfer called the Oakland Raiders and Denver Broncos in the second game of the Week 1 doubleheader; the game included a 63-yard field goal kicked by Oakland's Sebastian Janikowski, which tied the NFL record at the time.

=== NFL Network ===
In May 2011, Nessler was hired by NFL Network to call its Thursday Night Football telecasts, on which he was teamed with analyst Mike Mayock for an eight-game package.

In 2012 and 2013, Nessler continued to call the game package, expanded to thirteen games, before CBS Sports took over responsibility for the package in the 2014 NFL season.

=== Return to CBS ===
On May 31, 2016, CBS Sports announced that Nessler would return to the network to serve as lead play-by-play announcer for SEC college football games beginning in the 2017 season, replacing the outgoing Verne Lundquist. He was then reunited with Danielson, with whom he had worked at ESPN and ABC from 1992 to 1999.

Nessler's first SEC game for CBS was Florida at Arkansas on November 5, 2016. He assumed duties as CBS' lead college football announcer for the Sun Bowl one month later.

Since 2022, the Nessler and Danielson duo have been joined weekly by Jenny Dell and former NFL referee Gene Steratore. He also provides play-by-play for college basketball for the network, usually teaming with analyst Bill Raftery.

In 2018, Nessler called his first NCAA March Madness on TBS.

After CBS lost the broadcasting rights of the SEC to ESPN and ABC, Nessler, Danielson, and Dell subsequently relocated to CBS’ Big Ten college football coverage.

== Personal life ==
Nessler is a graduate of Minnesota State University, Mankato.

Nessler lives in the Atlanta area with his wife and family.

Sporting positions
Preceded by Keith Jackson (in 1973)	Lead Play–by–play announcer, NBA on ABC; 2002–2003	Succeeded by Al Michaels
Preceded by Marv Albert (on NBC)	Play–by–play announcer, NBA Finals; 2003	Succeeded by Al Michaels
Preceded by Brent Musburger	Lead Play–by–play announcer, College Football on ABC; 2004	Succeeded by Keith Jackson
Preceded by None	Play–by–play announcer, Saturday Primetime; 2005–2006	Succeeded by Dan Shulman
Preceded by Keith Jackson	Lead Play–by–play announcer, ESPN College Football on ABC; 2006–2008	Succeeded by Sean McDonough
Preceded by Bob Papa	Thursday Night Football play–by–play announcer 2011–2013	Succeeded by Jim Nantz
Preceded by Verne Lundquist	Play–by–play announcer, College Football on CBS; 2017–present	Succeeded by Incumbent
