= James Gadwood =

American attorney

Chief Counsel of the Internal Revenue Service
- Nominee
- Assuming office
- President: Donald Trump
- Succeeding: Marjorie Rollinson

Personal details
- Born: James Robert Gadwood
- Spouse: Jill Hamers (m. 2011)
- Education: University of Michigan (BA); Boston University (JD)

James Robert Gadwood is an American attorney.

== Early life and education ==
James Robert Gadwood graduated from Hackett Catholic Central High School in Kalamazoo, Michigan, in 2001. He graduated from the University of Michigan and from the Boston University School of Law.

== Career ==
=== Tax work (2008–present) ===
By 2011, Gadwood had worked at Sullivan & Cromwell. That year, he married Jill Hamers. By 2026, Gadwood had become a lawyer at Miller & Chevalier. According to The New York Times, he represented DJT Holdings LLC, President Donald Trump's holding company.

=== Chief counsel of the Internal Revenue Service nomination ===
In June 2026, Bloomberg Tax reported that the Senate Committee on Finance was vetting Gadwood as the chief counsel of the Internal Revenue Service. On June 23, Trump nominated Gadwood to the position. According to The New York Times, his confirmation hearing was expected to involve his position on Trump v. Internal Revenue Service (2026), a lawsuit Trump filed against the Internal Revenue Service that resulted in a settlement barring the agency from investigating Trump and his companies.
