= Trials of Paul Manafort =

2018 American criminal trials

Plea agreement by Paul Manafort providing full cooperation with the Special Counsel

The two criminal trials of Paul Manafort were the first cases brought to trial by the special counsel's investigation into Russian interference in the 2016 presidential election. Manafort served as campaign chair for the Donald Trump 2016 presidential campaign from June 20 to August 19, 2016. In July 2017, the FBI conducted a raid of Manafort's home, authorized by search warrant under charges of interference in the 2016 election. Manafort and his business assistant Rick Gates were both indicted and arrested in October 2017 for charges of conspiracy against the United States, making false statements, money laundering, and failing to register as foreign agents for Ukraine. Gates entered a plea bargain in February 2018.

Manafort's first trial on 18 criminal counts began on July 31, 2018. In that trial, Gates testified that he committed tax evasion and embezzlement crimes with Manafort. Under cross examination, Gates also admitted to an extramarital relationship funded with money embezzled from Manafort. Manafort was found guilty on eight counts (covering filing false tax returns, bank fraud, and failing to disclose a foreign bank account), but a mistrial was declared on the remaining ten counts due to a single juror harboring reasonable doubts.

Weeks later, before a second trial on seven separate criminal counts could begin, Manafort reached a plea bargain on two of those counts (conspiracy to defraud the United States and witness tampering). As part of the agreement, he also admitted guilt to an additional seven counts left unresolved from the earlier mistrial (bank fraud and bank fraud conspiracy), forfeited several properties and accounts, and agreed to full cooperation with the prosecution.

== Background ==
=== FBI and special counsel investigation ===
Paul Manafort is a lawyer, lobbyist, and political consultant. He often lobbied on behalf of controversial foreign leaders including former President of Ukraine Viktor Yanukovych, a pro-Russian politician with strong ties to Russian president Vladimir Putin. Manafort became an adviser to Yanukovych in 2004. After Yanokovych's overthrow he helped to organize an opposition party to the new government. He was also involved in investment projects with Russian and Ukrainian oligarchs.

The FBI reportedly began a criminal investigation into Manafort in 2014, shortly after Yanukovich was deposed. That investigation predated the 2016 election by several years and is ongoing. In addition, Manafort is also a person of interest in the FBI counterintelligence probe looking into the Russian government's interference in the 2016 presidential election.

On January 19, 2017, the eve of Trump's presidential inauguration, it was reported that Manafort was under active investigation by multiple federal agencies including the Central Intelligence Agency, National Security Agency, Federal Bureau of Investigation (FBI), Director of National Intelligence and the financial crimes unit of the Treasury Department. Investigations were said to be based on intercepted Russian communications as well as financial transactions. It was later confirmed that Manafort was wiretapped by the FBI "before and after the [2016] election ... including a period when Manafort was known to talk to President Donald Trump". The surveillance of Manafort began in 2014, before Donald Trump announced his candidacy for President of the United States.

Special Counsel Robert Mueller, who was appointed on May 17, 2017, by the Justice Department to oversee the investigation into Russian interference in the 2016 United States elections and related matters, took over the existing criminal probe involving Manafort.

=== Chairman of Donald Trump's 2016 campaign ===
In February 2016, Manafort approached Donald Trump through a mutual friend, Thomas J. Barrack Jr. He pointed out his experience advising presidential campaigns in the United States and around the world, described himself as an outsider not connected to the Washington establishment, and offered to work without salary. In March 2016 he joined Trump's presidential campaign to take the lead in getting commitments from convention delegates. On June 20, 2016, Trump fired campaign manager Corey Lewandowski and promoted Manafort to the position. Manafort took over control of the daily operations of the campaign as well as an expanded $20 million budget, hiring decisions, advertising, and media strategy.

In August 2016, Manafort's connections to former Ukrainian President Viktor Yanukovych and his pro-Russian Party of Regions drew national attention in the US, where it was reported that Manafort may have illegally received $12.7 million in off-the-books funds from the Party of Regions.

On August 17, 2016, Trump received his first security briefing. The same day, August 17, Trump shook up his campaign organization in a way that appeared to minimize Manafort's role. It was reported that members of Trump's family, particularly Jared Kushner, who had originally been a strong backer of Manafort, had become uneasy about his Russian connections and suspected that he had not been forthright about them. Manafort stated in an internal staff memorandum that he would "remain the campaign chairman and chief strategist, providing the big-picture, long-range campaign vision". However, two days later, Trump announced his acceptance of Manafort's resignation from the campaign after Steve Bannon and Kellyanne Conway took on senior leadership roles within that campaign.

Upon Manafort's resignation as campaign chairman, Newt Gingrich stated that "nobody should underestimate how much Paul Manafort did to really help get this campaign to where it is right now". Gingrich later added that, for the Trump administration, "It makes perfect sense for them to distance themselves from somebody who apparently didn't tell them what he was doing."

== Raid and pre-trial motions through June 2018 ==
Manafort and Gates indictment from United States District Court for the Eastern District of Virginia superseding indictment, dated February 22, 2018

Manafort superseding indictment in the United States District Court for the District of Columbia, dated February 23, 2018

On July 26, 2017, the day after Manafort's United States Senate Select Committee on Intelligence hearing and the morning of his planned hearing before the United States Senate Committee on the Judiciary, FBI agents at Mueller's direction conducted a raid on Manafort's home in Alexandria, Virginia, using a search warrant to seize documents and other materials in regard to the Russian meddling in the 2016 election. Before the search, Manafort had voluntarily provided some documents to congressional investigators, including the notes he took during the meeting with Veselnitskaya. United States v. Paul Manafort was analyzed by attorney George T. Conway III (husband of Kellyanne Conway), who wrote that it strengthened the constitutionality of the Mueller investigation.

On October 27, 2017, Manafort and Rick Gates were indicted by a federal grand jury as part of Mueller's investigation. The twelve-count indictment charged them with conspiracy against the United States, making false statements, money laundering, and failing to register as foreign agents for Ukraine as required by the Foreign Agents Registration Act. Manafort was charged with four counts of failing to file reports of foreign bank and financial accounts (Note: Some of the alleged money laundering occurred through the Kyrgyzstan based Asia Universal Bank (AUB) with funds received in Manafort's Wachovia bank account in Virginia from the Party of Regions via the Belize based Neocom Systems Limited's AUB account on 14 October 2009; however, Manafort stated to the FBI on September 2, 2014, that he had never heard of Neocom Systems.) while Gates was charged with three. The charges arise from Manafort's consulting work for a pro-Russian government in Ukraine and are unrelated to the Trump campaign.

On October 30, 2017, Manafort and Gates surrendered to the FBI, and a judge placed them both under house arrest and required them to provide unsecured bonds. On December 4, 2017, prosecutors asked the judge to revoke Manafort's bond agreement, charging that Manafort violated the terms of his bail by working on an op-ed piece with Konstantin Kilimnik, an associate with ties to Russian intelligence.

U.S. District Court for the District of Columbia Judge Amy Berman Jackson issued an order on December 22, 2017, demanding that Gates explain why his comments in a brief, videotaped address to the fundraiser held in an Arlington Holiday Inn on December 19 did not amount to a violation of the gag order she issued in the case. Of particular concern to Jackson is Gates' involvement with the Washington-area lobbyist who organized the event, Jack Burkman.

=== 2018 ===
On January 16, 2018, Jackson denied the government's proposal for a May 14 trial, indicating that the criminal trial appears likely to start in September or October. Gates was released from home confinement, but not Manafort. A letter from Manafort's physician had asked that he be permitted to attend a gym for health reasons, but Jackson said, "While he's subject to home confinement, he's not confined to his couch, and I believe he has plenty of opportunity to exercise."

On February 1, 2018, three of Gates' attorneys filed a motion to withdraw their representation of Gates. Walter Mack, one of the attorneys, said in court the previous month that Mueller's prosecutors had warned him of more impending charges against Gates. Gates has reportedly added Tom Green, a prominent white-collar attorney, to his defense team, signaling a possible change to his legal approach; and attorneys from Green's firm were seen entering the building where Mueller works. On the hearing of the motion on February 8 before Judge Jackson, the attorneys cited 'irreconcilable differences' with their client. Gates' new attorney has not filed a formal appearance in the case, which is the typical procedure when changing counsel. The outcome of the hearing is still subject to a gag order.

On February 15, 2018, CNN reported that Gates was finalizing a plea deal with Mueller's office, indicating he was poised to cooperate in the investigation. He had already undergone his "Queen for a Day" interview, in which Gates answered any and all questions from Mueller's team, including about his own case and other potential criminal activity he witnessed or participated in.

On February 22, 2018, Manafort and Gates were further charged with additional crimes, involving a tax avoidance scheme and bank fraud, in Virginia. The charges were filed in the United States District Court for the Eastern District of Virginia, rather than in the United States District Court for the District of Columbia, as the tax fraud overt actions had occurred in Virginia and not in the District, forcing Mueller to bring the charges in Virginia, because one of the defendants did not agree to waive the issue of venue jurisdiction. The new indictment alleges that Manafort, with assistance from Gates, laundered over $30 million through offshore bank accounts between approximately 2006 and 2015. Manafort allegedly used funds in these offshore accounts to purchase real estate in the United States, in addition to personal goods and services.

On February 23, 2018, Gates pleaded guilty in federal court to lying to investigators and engaging in a conspiracy to defraud the United States. Gates said he had previously intended to challenge the charges against him, but recently decided to plead guilty. He admitted that he had lied to investigators in February 2018 while he was under indictment and negotiating with prosecutors. Gates faces a possible prison sentence of nearly six years, but he agreed to cooperate with the Mueller investigation for a possible sentence reduction, possibly only probation, depending on the level of cooperation he provides to the government. Through a spokesman, Manafort expressed disappointment in Gates' decision to plead guilty and said he has no similar plans. "I continue to maintain my innocence," he said. On February 27, the special counsel moved to dismiss without prejudice 22 tax and bank fraud charges against Gates as part of their plea agreement.

On February 28, 2018, Manafort entered a not guilty plea in the United States District Court for the District of Columbia. Jackson subsequently set a trial date of September 17, 2018, and reprimanded Manafort and his attorney for violating her gag order by issuing a statement the previous week after former co-defendant Gates pleaded guilty. On March 8, 2018, Manafort also pleaded not guilty to bank fraud and tax charges in federal court in Alexandria, Virginia. Judge T. S. Ellis III of the Eastern District of Virginia set his trial on those charges to begin on July 10, 2018. On March 28, 2018, Manafort declined a plea deal.

In response to Manafort's court motions that charges against him be dismissed because Mueller exceeded his investigative authority, Mueller's office on April 2, 2018, released in a court filing a partially-redacted memorandum of August 2, 2017, in which Rod Rosenstein specifically authorized Mueller to investigate whether Manafort "committed a crime or crimes by colluding with Russian government officials with respect to the Russian government's efforts to interfere with the 2016 election for president of the United States, in violation of United States law," as well as whether he "committed a crime or crimes arising out of payments he received from the Ukrainian government before and during the tenure of President Viktor Yanukovych." Manafort's suit claiming that the Mueller investigation exceeded its investigative authority was dismissed on April 27, 2018. On June 26, 2018, after harshly criticizing the scope of the Mueller investigation the preceding month, Ellis issued an opinion stating that the Mueller investigation had acted within its authority, clearing the way for Manafort's trial to proceed.

In a court hearing on April 19, 2018, the Justice Department for the first time specifically noted the Mueller investigation's interest in whether Manafort provided a backchannel between the Trump campaign and Russian officials, adding that following the money trail of Manafort's consulting business was a natural necessity of investigating such a backchannel.

On June 4, 2018, Mueller accused Manafort of witness tampering by contacting witnesses by phone and encrypted messaging "in an effort to secure materially false testimony," asking a federal judge to revise or revoke the release agreement that had kept Manafort out of jail pending trial. On June 8, 2018, the Mueller grand jury added additional charges of obstruction of justice and conspiracy to obstruct justice against Manafort and his longtime associate, Konstantin Kilimnik, whom Manafort had contacted to assist in influencing witnesses. On June 15, 2018, Manafort's bail was revoked, and he was jailed pending trial.

On July 17, 2018, Ellis denied Manafort's motion to move the trial to Roanoke, Virginia.

== Trial in Virginia ==
Manafort's trial in the Eastern District of Virginia began on July 31, 2018, with District Judge T. S. Ellis III presiding. Manafort was charged with various financial crimes including tax evasion, bank fraud, and money laundering. There were 18 criminal charges including 5 falsifications of income tax returns, 4 failures to file foreign bank account reports, 4 counts of bank fraud, and 5 counts of bank fraud conspiracy.

=== Opening arguments ===
On July 31, a jury was seated, both sides made their opening statements, and the first prosecution witness was called. Uzo Asonye, an assistant United States attorney and a member of Mueller's team, presented opening remarks on behalf of the United States. Thomas Zehnle, one of Manafort's lawyers, presented opening remarks on behalf of Manafort.

=== Prosecution ===
On the first and second day, prosecutors presented evidence of Manafort's expensive tastes and lavish lifestyle while he was working for Russian oligarchs. Numerous witnesses said they had been paid via wire transfer from banks in Cyprus. On the third day, two of Manafort's former accountants testified. The first accountant testified that Manafort signed tax forms four times between 2011 and 2014, stating that he had no foreign bank accounts. The second, testifying under a grant of immunity, revealed that she had filed a false tax return on behalf of Manafort in 2014. She said she changed the amount of a loan so that Manafort would owe less tax, admitting that she had done it knowingly and that she regrets it.

==== Rick Gates ====
Rick Gates felony information

Rick Gates' plea agreement with Robert S. Mueller

Manafort's business assistant Rick Gates, who had earlier pleaded guilty to two felony counts in a plea bargain, was on the stand for three days. He testified that he committed crimes with Manafort. He said he and Manafort carried out an elaborate offshore tax-evasion and bank fraud scheme using shell companies and bank accounts in Kyrgyzstan, Cyprus, St. Vincent and the Grenadines and the United Kingdom to funnel millions of dollars to themselves from their political consulting work in Ukraine. Gates admitted to concealing the accounts and the income from U.S. tax authorities by disguising the income as loans via falsified bank loan documents. During testimony, Gates also admitted that he embezzled hundreds of thousands of dollars from Manafort. Under cross examination, Gates admitted to an extramarital relationship approximately a decade ago that involved first-class flights and trysts in luxury hotels, and admitted that this affair was funded with money embezzled from Manafort.

After Gates' testimony ended, an IRS agent testifying as an expert witness said that Manafort had failed to report at least $16 million in income from Ukraine between 2010 and 2014. When he testified that he had been present during part of the trial, Ellis berated the prosecution in front of the jury for allowing him to watch the trial. The prosecution filed a motion for a corrective ruling, citing the trial transcript where Ellis had earlier granted permission for the expert witness to attend. The next day the judge apologized and told jurors to disregard his remarks.

==== Corruption ====
After another day of explanatory testimony regarding bank records and such, the prosecution turned from the topics of foreign money laundering and bank fraud to that of Manafort's allegedly corrupt practices during and after his time as Trump's campaign chairman. This involved the testimony of several employees of the Federal Savings Bank of Chicago about Manafort's efforts to obtain large loans from the bank in 2016. Dennis Raico, a senior vice president at the bank, testified that Manafort's first contact with the bank occurred in April 2016 and that Manafort was discussing loans and politics with the bank's founder, CEO, and chairman Stephen Calk in May. Calk was named an economic advisor to Donald Trump's presidential campaign in August, at Manafort's suggestion. James Brennan, another vice president at the bank, testified that an employee at the bank noted that Manafort had no income as of July 2016, while claiming to be owed $2.4 million, and was more than 90 days late on a $300,000 credit card bill, which Manafort blamed on Gates. Brennan also testified that bank employees discovered Manafort had loans outstanding on two other unidentified properties.

Manafort also failed to disclose that he was in default on two other real estate loans. Brennan testified that the bank's president opposed issuing a $9.5 million loan to Manafort but was ordered to do so by Calk. That loan was the largest ever issued by the bank, and a subsequent loan to Manafort of $6.5 million was the second largest. (They were preceded by negotiations for a third loan, which in the end was not granted.) Calk told Manafort he wanted a position in the administration of then president-elect Trump, as well as inauguration tickets. In emails introduced into evidence at the beginning of the trial, Calk sent several messages to Manafort listing administration positions he aspired to, including four cabinet posts, numerous ambassadorships, and Secretary of the Army. Manafort then sent an email to Jared Kushner recommending Calk as Secretary of the Army, to which Kushner replied, "On it!".

=== Defense ===
The strategy of the defense was to shift blame from Manafort to Gates, by arguing that Gates was primarily responsible, and testified primarily to secure leniency for himself. On August 14, before the jury was seated, Ellis reminded Manafort of his rights and asked if he intended to testify. Manafort said he did not. The defense then rested its case without calling any witnesses.

=== Closing arguments ===
Closing arguments began and ended on August 15. Prosecutors argued that the case was about lies by Manafort to hide his income from federal authorities and defraud banks. They recognized that Gates was a problematic witness - "I'm not asking you to like him" - and urged jurors to consider the other 10 witnesses and the evidence - "The star witness in this case is the documents." The defense argued that "the government has not met its burden of proof" and repeatedly accused Gates of lying.

While the jury was deliberating, the judge revealed that he had been threatened and was being guarded by deputy U.S. marshals. Judge Ellis also said that if the jurors were identified, they would be threatened as well and that for their "peace and safety", he would not release their names.

=== Verdict ===
On August 21, their fourth day of deliberation, the jury found Manafort guilty on 8 of the 18 felony counts, including five counts of filing false tax returns, two counts of bank fraud, and one count of failing to disclose a foreign bank account. Judge Ellis declared a mistrial on the remaining 10 charges. The jury consisted of six men and six women. According to one juror, it was a single juror who prevented conviction on the remaining 10 counts. The holdout, a female, reportedly said that she harbored reasonable doubt.

Ellis rejected subsequent requests by Manafort to wear street clothing instead of a prison uniform in courtroom appearances.

Trump responded to the decision by tweeting that he felt "very badly" for Manafort and his family: " 'Justice' took a 12 year old tax case, among other things, applied tremendous pressure on him and, unlike Michael Cohen, he refused to 'break' — make up stories in order to get a 'deal.' Such respect for a brave man!"

=== Sentencing ===
On October 18, Ellis dismissed the remaining charges in the case without prejudice, seemingly clearing the way for final sentencing. Manafort was then scheduled to be sentenced in early February 2019 for his eight jury convictions in the Virginia case. However, on January 28, Ellis postponed the sentencing date until allegations Manafort had breached his plea agreement with prosecutors in the D.C. court were resolved.

On March 7, 2019, Ellis sentenced Manafort to 47 months in prison, less 9 months for time already served, saying that Manafort had lived an "otherwise blameless life". The sentence was "far lighter than the 19- to 24-year prison term recommended under sentencing guidelines." The 47-month sentence was for the most serious crime, bank fraud; the other crimes were given lesser sentences which will run concurrently.

== Trial in District of Columbia ==
Statement of charges Paul Manafort pleaded guilty and agreed were true, dated September 14, 2018

Manafort's trial in the U.S. District Court for the District of Columbia began on September 14, 2018, with Judge Amy Berman Jackson presiding. In DC, Manafort was scheduled to be tried on charges of conspiracy to defraud the United States, failing to register as a foreign agent, money laundering, witness tampering and making false statements.

The jury selection process began on September 4, 2018; voir dire was due to start on the 17th. During this time, the parties negotiated a plea deal, and on September 14, during what was technically his second trial, Manafort pleaded guilty to two charges: conspiracy to defraud the United States and witness tampering. He also admitted to most other charges against him, both in DC and those for which there was a hung jury at his first trial in Virginia; those charges will be dropped if prosecutors are satisfied that he has fully cooperated with them. As part of the plea bargain, Manafort agreed to the forfeiture of three bank accounts, a life insurance policy, and five New York properties estimated to be worth $22 million. Two of the properties were purchased with offshore funds as a form of money laundering, according to prosecutors. Manafort further agreed to "testify fully, completely and truthfully before any and all Grand Juries in the District of Columbia and elsewhere, and at any and all trials of cases or other court proceedings in the District of Columbia and elsewhere".

=== Post-trial activity ===
Mueller's office stated in a court filing on November 26, 2018, that Manafort had repeatedly lied about a variety of matters, breaching the terms of his plea agreement. Manafort's attorneys disputed the assertion. On December 7, 2018, the special counsel's office filed a document with the court listing five areas in which they say Manafort lied to them, which they said negated the plea agreement. It was also revealed that Manafort, through his attorney, had been briefing White House attorneys about his interactions with the special counsel's office.

In January 2019, Manafort's lawyers submitted a filing to the court in response to the accusation that he had lied to investigators. Through an error in redacting, the document accidentally revealed that while he was campaign chairman, Manafort met with Konstantin Kilimnik, who is believed to be linked to Russian intelligence. The filing says Manafort gave him polling data related to the 2016 campaign and discussed a Ukrainian peace plan with him. In a hearing on February 7, 2019, prosecutors speculated that Manafort had concealed facts about his activities to enhance the possibility of his receiving a pardon. They said that Manafort's work with Ukraine had continued and he met with Gates, and also with Kilimnik, in an exclusive New York cigar bar. Gates said the three left the premises separately, each using different exits.

The judge ruled on February 13 that Manafort had lied about three separate matters after entering a plea bargain with prosecutors, relieving the government of any obligation they had to request leniency when Manafort is sentenced.

=== Sentencing ===
On March 13, 2019, Jackson sentenced Manafort to 73 months in prison, with 30 months concurrent with the jail time he had received in the Virginia case, resulting in an additional 43 months in jail (30 additional months for conspiracy to defraud the United States, and 13 additional months for witness tampering). Manafort also apologized for his actions.

Immediately following sentencing, Manafort's attorney Kevin M. Downing gave a statement to media outside the courthouse in which he falsely asserted that Judge Jackson had "conceded that there was absolutely no evidence of any Russian collusion in this case" and "Two courts have ruled no evidence of any collusion with the Russians". Downing was heckled and drowned out by members of the public, shouting "Liar" and "That's not what [the judge] said." The judge had actually said that the court had heard no evidence on the subject of whether Trump's campaign had conspired with Russia, and that the "no collusion mantra" was not accurate. After the earlier sentencing for the Virginia case, Downing had made a more carefully worded courthouse-steps comment, "There is absolutely no evidence that Paul Manafort was involved in any collusion with any government official from Russia." In both instances Trump seized upon Downing's comments to falsely claim that the judges had proclaimed there was no collusion with Russia.

== Presidential pardon ==
When White House Press Secretary Sarah Huckabee Sanders was asked at a press conference on August 22, 2018, whether Trump might pardon Manafort, she told reporters, "I am not aware of any conversations regarding that at all." During an interview with Fox & Friends the same day, Trump did not deny the possibility, saying only that he had "great respect" for the legal challenges that Manafort was facing. On August 23, Trump's personal lawyer Rudy Giuliani told The Washington Post that Trump had asked in June about the possibility of pardoning Manafort and that the president's lawyers had advised him against the use of a pardon before Mueller's investigation had ended. Later the same day Giuliani told Fox News that the discussion in June had been about pardons in general and that Manafort's name had not been mentioned.

In November 2018, after Mueller's office said Manafort had violated the terms of his plea deal, Trump publicly hinted that he might pardon Manafort. Congressman Jerrold Nadler, the incoming chair of the House Judiciary Committee, opined that "dangling a pardon in front of Manafort" could lead to charges of obstruction of justice.

In December 2020, Trump pardoned Manafort. Trump did not pardon Manafort's deputy, Rick Gates, who was sentenced in the previous year to 45 days in prison but extensively cooperated with prosecutors.

== See also ==
- Greg Andres
- Tad Devine
- Kevin M. Downing
- Shanlon Wu
- Links between Trump associates and Russian officials
