= The Final Four of Everything =

2007 book by Richard Sandomir

- Author: Mark Reiter, Richard Sandomir
- Language: English
- Publisher: Bloomsbury USA
- Publication date: March 9, 2007
- ISBN: 9781596913103

The Final Four of Everything is a 2007 book written by Mark Reiter and Richard Sandomir on the subject of bracketology. Bracketology is the process of predicting the field of the NCAA basketball tournament, named as such because it is commonly used to fill in tournament brackets for the postseason.
