= Bracket (tournament) =

Diagram of a tournament

The partially-completed bracket for a 16-player single-elimination tournament. The quarterfinals have been completed, and the semifinals will be Lisa vs. Ernie, and Andrew vs. Robert. The final will be between the two semifinal winners.

A bracket or tournament bracket is a tree-like diagram that represents the series of games played during a knockout tournament. Different knockout tournament formats have different brackets; the simplest and most common is that of the single-elimination tournament. The name "bracket" is American English, derived from the resemblance of the links in the tree diagram to the bracket punctuation symbol ] or [ (called a "square bracket" in British English). The closest British term is draw, although this implies an element of chance, whereas some brackets are determined entirely by seeding.

In some tournaments, the full bracket is determined before the first match. In such cases, fans may enjoy trying to predict the winners of the initial round and of the consequent later matchups. This is called "bracketology", particularly in relation to the NCAA Division I men's basketball tournament. This prediction is not possible in tournaments such as the FA Cup and the UEFA Champions League knockout phase, in which the pairings for a later round might not be made until after the previous round has been played (UEFA Champions League makes its ultimate bracket draw at the Round of 16 stage).

== Usage in North America ==
Brackets are commonly found in major North American professional sports leagues and in U.S. college sports. Often, at the end of the regular season, the league holds a post-season tournament (most commonly called a playoff) to determine which team is the best out of all of the teams in the league. This is done because often in American professional sports there are at least two different conferences, and teams mostly play other teams in their own conference. Examples of this are the American Football Conference and the National Football Conference in the NFL, the American League and the National League in Major League Baseball, and the Eastern Conference and the Western Conference in the NBA or NHL.

When there are only two different conferences, there are two sides of the bracket. One conference is on one side, while the other is on the opposite side. Each side is organized according to a team's seeding; higher-seeded teams are matched against lower-seeded teams. Teams that qualify for the post-season tournament only compete against teams in their own conference, until only one team from each conference remains. These two teams, called the conference champions, play each other to determine the best in the league. Other leagues, like the NHL, have two conferences, each of which is divided into divisions, usually by region. In the post-season tournament, only the teams with the best records qualify, except the division winner (and also #2 and #3 in the division in the NHL) having an automatic entry into the tournament.

Some North American professional post-season tournaments are single-elimination format. If a bye is required, the top seeded teams usually get the bye. There is usually no third place match to separate the third and fourth place teams.

The concept is even more visible in college sports, most notably in reference to the NCAA Division I men's basketball tournament, in which millions of casual and serious fans "fill out brackets"—predict the winners of each game in the tournament—in both formal contests, sponsored by various corporations, and informal betting pools among friends or colleagues. The brackets are much larger than those in North American professional leagues—while no more than 16 teams qualify for the postseason in any major North American league (this is the case in the NBA and NHL), 68 teams (out of over 350) advance to the NCAA men's tournament, with most bracket contests involving 64 of these teams.

== Examples ==
The diagrams for formats other than single-elimination are more complex than a simple tree.

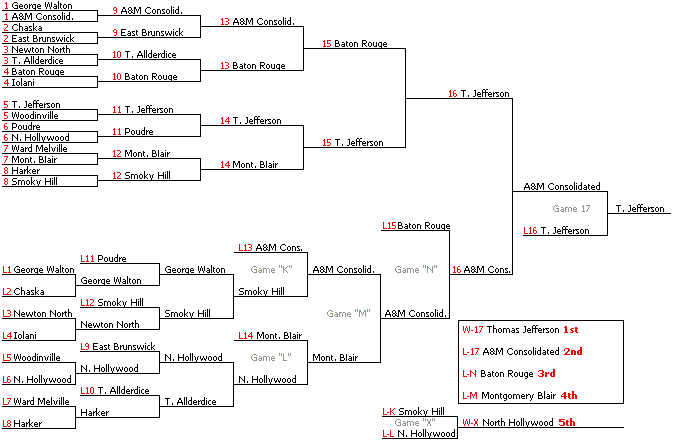
The double-elimination bracket from the 2004 national Science Bowl [Super Ball]

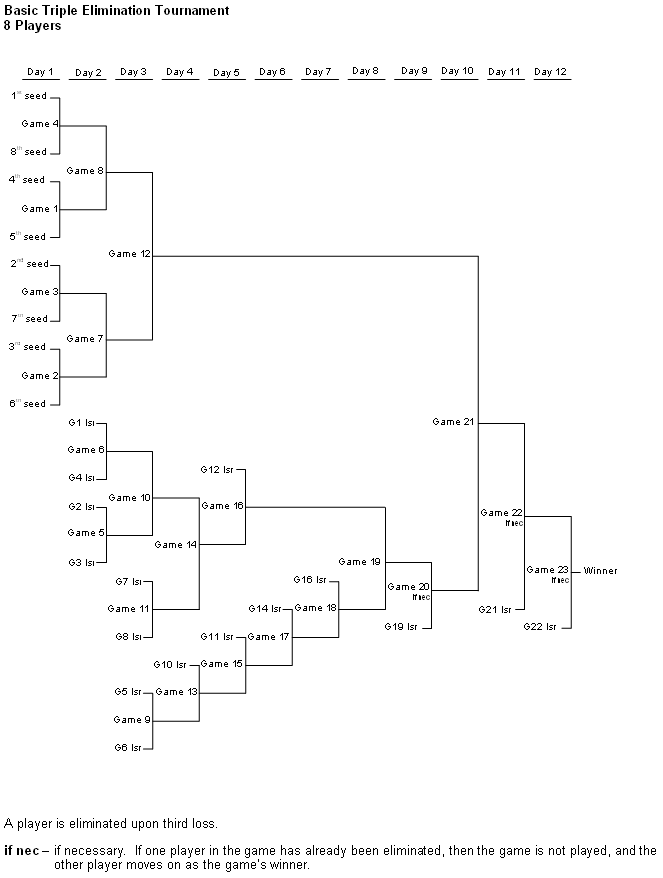
A triple-elimination tournament.

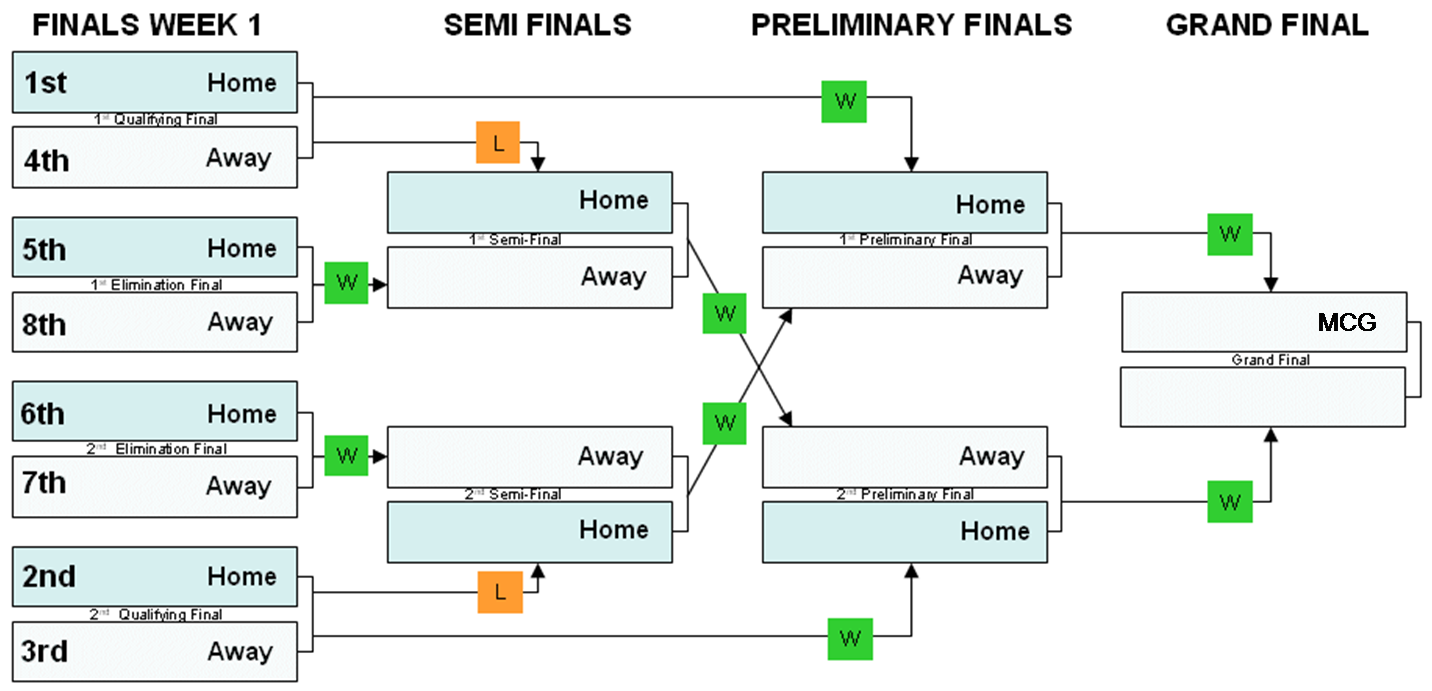
Australian Football League finals incorporating a bye for the highest two seeded, first round winners.

The Page playoff system used in various T20 cricket leagues.

== Types of brackets ==
Single Elimination
Teams play "Pool Play" games in order to be "seeded" for the Brackets. Once in the brackets, teams play. Winners advance within the brackets to the right, whereas losers are eliminated in "Single Elimination"

Double Elimination
Teams play "Pool Play" games to gain their "seeding" going into the brackets. Each team plays its first games. Winners advance to play the winners. Losers play a consolation round.

== Versions of advancement ==
March Madness Seeding (Best v Worst in a division)
Divisions are broken into pools (e.g., North, South, East, West) and within each pool teams are ranked. The top seed plays the worst seed, the second best seed plays the 2nd worst seed within the pool, etc., until all teams play their first round. If the pool has an odd (not divisible by 2) number of teams, there will be a "play in" game of the worst vs the 2nd worst team. Such a seeding system produces a wide variety of matches, but requires many games to determine an outcome.

Jacobian Ladders (Best in pools play, 2nd best in pools play each other, 3rd best in pools play each other, etc.)
Within each pool, the number 1 team plays all the other number 1 teams within the other pools. Number 2s play number 2s, numbers 3s play number 3s, etc.
- Assuming an even number of pools (e.g., pool A, B, C, and D), each of the #1 ranked team based upon their pool play results play an initial game (A1 vs B1, C1 vs D1). Winners go to the championship. Losers play for 3rd and 4th place.
- Assuming an odd pools number of pools (e.g., pool A, B, and C), Seed 1 from Pool A (A1) plays seed 1 from Pool B (B1). C1 plays the "Wildcard" from the second best finishers from within all 3 pools based upon the ranking criteria.
- All #2, #3, etc., ranked teams play in "Consolation rounds" to determine their ranked order
Winners of these pools play at most two games to determine the champion of the division. The end result can be sensitive to ranking criteria and allocation of teams to pools.
