= Bracketology =

Predicting the participants and seeding of an NCAA basketball tournament

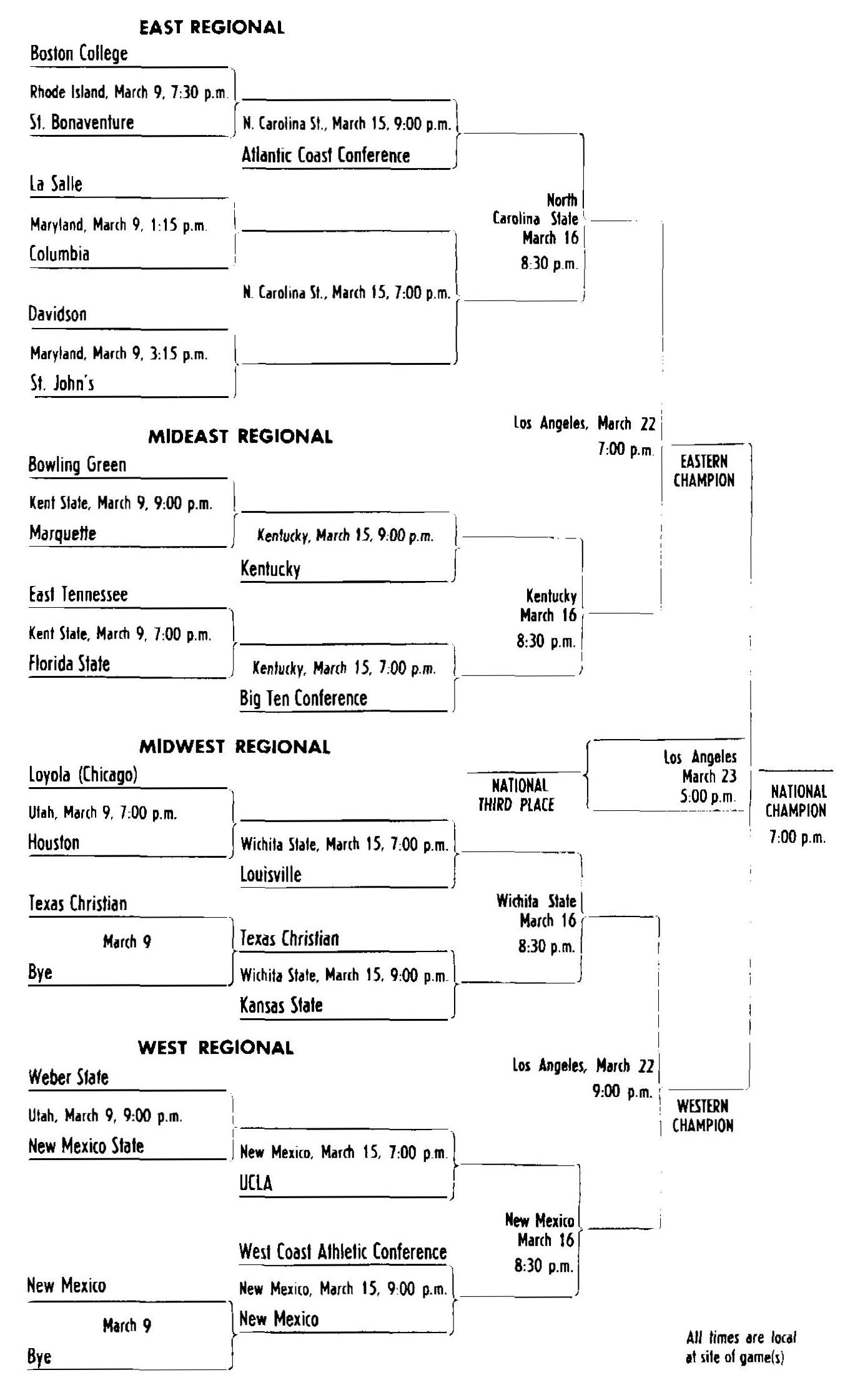
An NCAA tournament bracket from the 1968 season

Bracketology is the process of predicting the field of college basketball participants in the NCAA men's and women's basketball tournaments, named as such because it is commonly used to fill in tournament brackets for the postseason. It incorporates some method of predicting the metrics the NCAA Selection Committee will use (such as rating percentage index through the 2018 tournament, and the NCAA Evaluation Tool [NET] since 2019) in order to determine at-large (non-conference winning) teams to complete the field of 68 teams, and, to seed the field by ranking all teams from first through sixty-eighth. Bracketology also encompasses the process of predicting the winners of each of the brackets. In recent years the concept of bracketology has been applied to areas other than basketball.

== Background ==
Joe Lunardi is credited with inventing the term bracketology. Lunardi had been editor and owner of the Blue Ribbon College Basketball Yearbook, a preseason guide roughly 400 pages long. In 1995, Blue Ribbon added an 80-page postseason supplement which was released the night the brackets were announced. So that the release could be timely, Lunardi began predicting the selection committee's bracket. On February 25, 1996, The Philadelphia Inquirer referred to Lunardi as a bracketologist, which is the first known instance the term was applied to a college basketball expert. While Lunardi did not recall using the term before its use in the article, Inquirer writer Mike Jensen credits its origins to Lunardi. Lunardi soon started the website Bracketology.net, and ESPN began running his predictions in exchange for a link to his website.

By 2002, Lunardi had his own Bracketology page with ESPN. He also teaches an online course at Saint Joseph's University titled "Fundamentals of Bracketology".

== Predicting participants ==
Using the NCAA basketball tournament selection process, the NET, and the seeding and balancing process, a "bracketologist" places teams in the tournament in the various regions (most commonly East, West, Midwest, and South however sometimes the region names are changed to reflect the host cities). Some bracketologists go as far as placing teams in which "pods" they will play in the first and second rounds. Generally, the lists also show the last four teams in and the first four teams out. However, these brackets change daily as conference tournaments continue and teams automatically qualify for the tournament.

A bracketologist's credibility is judged on how many teams they predict correctly being in the tournament and the average difference between the bracketologist's projected seed and the actual seed assigned by the NCAA Selection Committee. The difference between projected matchups and the differences between the "pods" selected in the first and second rounds are less important. Typically, bracketologists measure their success by comparing their projected seed lists to other bracketologists, as can be seen on the bracket matrix.

== Predicting winners ==
Various methods are used to predict the winners in a bracket. While some use math and statistics, others make selections based on team mascots or colors. President Barack Obama famously made bracket predictions. After entering office, he presented his projected winners annually on ESPN in a segment called Barack-etology. However, in 2015 he was bested by his former political rival and 2012 presidential nominee, Mitt Romney, who ranked in the top 0.1 percent of entrants in ESPN's 2015 Tournament Challenge. Romney correctly predicted six of the "Elite Eight" teams, all of the "Final Four" teams, both teams in the championship game matchup, and that Duke would win the title.

== Non-basketball applications ==
Bracketology as a discipline has spread beyond a focus on basketball, into other sports, as well as pop culture, history, nature, and other topics where a loose application of binary opposition may be profitable for study or enjoyment, albeit without the label of "bracketology" itself.

This spread has been helped along by literary agent and writer Mark Reiter and sports journalist Richard Sandomir, who have edited two books on bracketology as applied to the world around them, most recently The Final Four of Everything, which was published by Simon & Schuster in May 2009.
