= Lee Tilghman =

American former influencer (born 1990)

Lee From America
- Born: Lee Tilghman; February 16, 1990 (age 36); Fairfield, Connecticut, U.S.
- Occupation: Wellness influencer (former)

Instagram information
- Page: Lee Tilghman
- Years active: 2014–present
- Followers: 240,671 (April 12, 2023)
- Website: Official website

Lee Tilghman (born February 16, 1990), known online as Lee From America, is an American internet personality. A former wellness blogger and influencer, she had over 370,000 Instagram followers before taking a hiatus from the platform in 2019. As of 2023, she writes a newsletter, Offline Time, about digital culture.

== Life and career ==
Tilghman grew up in Fairfield, Connecticut, outside of New York City. She studied creative writing at Saint Joseph's University in Philadelphia, graduating in 2012. She has maintained a public presence on the internet since college, starting with a blog, For the Love of Peanut Butter, about her recovery from anorexia as a teenager. She spent some time working on farms, and after college she moved to New York City and worked in finance.

In 2014, Tilghman started Lee From America as a food blog and Instagram account while working in marketing in the restaurant industry. The account took off in 2017 after she moved to Los Angeles, accruing over 300,000 followers by the next year. Described as a "wellness guru", she became known for posting about recipes (especially smoothie bowls), exercise (including yoga), and mental health and shared sponsored content for a variety of brands, from apparel to air travel, that earned her over $300,000 a year. Tilghman has polyendocrine metabolic ovarian syndrome (PMOS), and some of her posts suggested ways to manage the syndrome, such as fertility trackers and alternative-medicine seed cycling. She held a series of Matcha Mornings Workshops in 2018 in various US cities; the events—with $500 ticket prices—were criticized by some fans as out of touch and appropriative.

In February 2019, Tilghman began an extended break from Instagram. She had planned a short digital detox when flooding forced her out of her apartment, and that disruption to her routine led her to pause her online career and recognize the severity of her eating disorder, which she identified as orthorexia. In July 2019, she returned to Instagram as a critic of wellness culture, wearing more modest attire and a bowl cut and promising to "[use] her platform in a different way". She deleted some of her old posts and began trying to find a new online identity. She posted a video in November 2019 apologizing for her past promotion of diet culture via medically dubious advice that stemmed from a focus on body image. Since rebranding, her follower count fell by more than 100,000, and she gradually stopped sponsored posting.

Tilghman moved back to New York City in late 2020 and worked as a social media manager for a technology company into late 2021. Early the next year, she started a newsletter, Offline Time (formerly Pet Hair on Everything), where she writes about internet culture. In March 2023, she held an online fifteen-person workshop on "deinfluencing".
