= Uzo Asonye =

American attorney

Uzodinma Asonye is an American attorney. He is a partner at Davis Polk & Wardwell and the former Deputy Chief of the Financial Crimes and Public Corruption office at the Eastern District of Virginia.

== Early life and education ==
Asonye was born to a Nigerian American family. He attended Homewood-Flossmoor High School in Flossmoor, Illinois, graduating in 1998. He earned his bachelor's degree from Cornell University, where he was a member of the Quill and Dagger society, and his Juris Doctor from Yale Law School.

== Career ==
After college, he worked for the law firm O'Melveny & Myers, before joining the United States Attorney's office as deputy chief in the financial crimes and public corruption unit. Robert Mueller brought Asonye onto the Special Counsel investigation team. Asonye was the lead attorney of Paul Manafort's Virginia criminal trial. In 2021, he joined Davis Polk & Wardwell as a member of the firm's white collar team.
