= Blue Ribbon College Basketball Yearbook =

The Blue Ribbon College Basketball Yearbook is an annual publication which includes preseason previews of every NCAA Division I men's college basketball team in the United States. Created in 1981 for the 1981–82 season by future Boston Celtics general manager Chris Wallace, it had 3,000 subscribers nationwide without a major marketing plan. In 1994, Joe Lunardi and Chris Dortch purchased a significant share of Blue Ribbon from Wallace. It is currently compiled by a team of college basketball writers led by Dortch. The publication has been described as the "Bible" of college basketball, and its preseason rankings and awards predictions are widely reported in the press.
