= Seed cycling =

Eating edible seeds to alter menstrual cycle

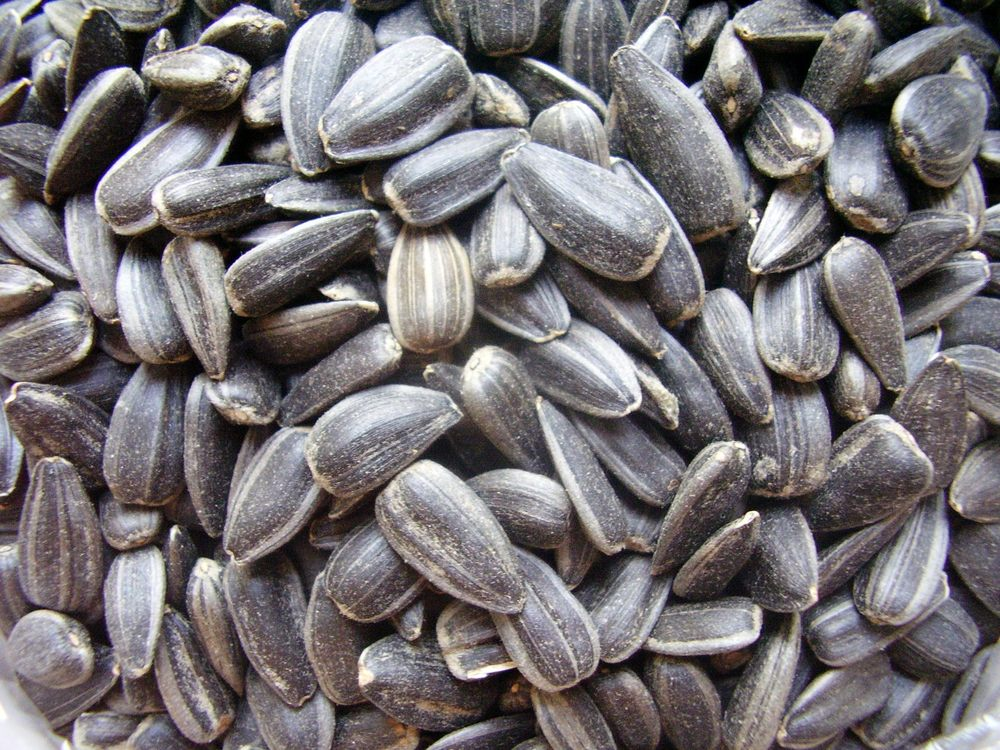
Some women find seed cycling improves hormonal disturbance which promotes a healthy life.

Seed cycling is a dietary practice that involves consuming specific seeds during the two primary phases of the menstrual cycle, with the aim of supporting hormonal balance. Typically, flaxseeds and pumpkin seeds are consumed during the follicular phase (Days 1–14) to support estrogen production, while sesame seeds and sunflower seeds are consumed during the luteal phase (Days 15–28) to support progesterone levels.

Seed cycling is a commonly promoted natural method to help regulate menstrual cycles, reduce symptoms of hormonal imbalance and support conditions related to hormonal imbalance, such as irregular cycles, premenstrual syndrome (PMS), polyendocrine metabolic ovarian syndrome (PMOS), and menstrual irregularities.

Understanding The Menstrual Cycle

Diagram of what happens during a menstrual cycle

The Follicular Phase (Cycle Days 1–14)

The follicular phase begins on the first day of menstruation (day 1) and continues until the start of ovulation (typically around day 14). Notably, the duration of the follicular phase can vary depending on the overall length of the cycle, whereas the luteal phase is generally more stable and lasts 14 days. During the follicular phase, follicle-stimulating hormone (FSH) stimulates the maturation of the ovarian follicles. As these follicles develop, estrogen levels rise, aiding in the thickening of the uterine lining. One dominant follicle is selected and continues to mature, producing high levels of estrogen. This triggers a surge in luteinising hormone (LH), which induces ovulation.

The Luteal Phase (Cycle Days 15-28)

The luteal phase begins after ovulation and continues until the start of menstruation. Following the release of an egg, the dominant follicle transforms into a structure called the corpus luteum, which primarily secretes progesterone and smaller amounts of estrogen. Increased levels of progesterone help further thicken the endometrial lining, preparing the uterus for possible implantation of a fertilised egg. If fertilisation does not occur, the corpus luteum degenerates after 14 days, leading to a drop in progesterone and estrogen levels. This hormonal withdrawal causes the endometrial lining to break down and shed during menstruation.

== Seed cycling practice ==
During the follicular phase (days 1-14), flaxseed and pumpkin seeds are commonly consumed. Flaxseeds are rich in lignans, which have phytoestrogenic properties that can help modulate estrogen levels during this phase. They also contain a significant amount of magnesium, vitamin B_{1} and omega-3 fatty acids. Pumpkin seeds are high in zinc, selenium, tryptophan, nutrients that are thought to support reproductive function and assist the body in preparing for ovulation

During the luteal phase (days 15-28), sesame and sunflower seeds are recommended. Sesame seeds contain lignins, zinc, calcium, and vitamin E. These nutrients are suggested to support production and estrogen metabolism. Sunflower seeds are high in vitamin E, selenium, and healthy fats, all of which may support progesterone synthesis and contribute to reducing inflammation.

A typical seed cycling routine involves consuming 1-2 tablespoons of each ground up seed daily, according to the cycle phase.The cycle typically begins with flaxseed and pumpkin seeds on day 1 of menstruation, continuing through day 14. From day 15 to 28, the seeds are switched to sesame and sunflower. For individuals with amenorrhea or irregular cycles, some practitioners suggest following the lunar cycle as a general guildine- starting flax and pumpkin seeds on the new moon and switching to sesame and sunflower seeds at the full moon.

Advocates suggest that the nutrient profile of these seeds including lignans, omega-3, and other essential whole vitamins and minerals may gently influence the body's natural hormone production and metabolism, potentially reducing symptoms such as PMS, irregular cycles, acne, and mood swings. Seed cycling is most popular among individuals seeking non-pharmaceutical approaches to menstrual wellness, particularly those experiencing perimenopause, polyendocrine metabolic ovarian syndrome (PMOS), or post-birth control symptoms.

Despite growing anecdotal popularity and its use in integrative health practices, there is limited scientific research specifically validating the efficacy of seed cycling. However, many of the nutrients found in the recommended seeds are known to support overall hormonal function and reproductive health.

== Research ==
A 2025 systematic review of 10 studies involving 635 participants found that seed cycling and supplementation with its component seeds may have beneficial effects on menstrual symptoms, hormone levels, and metabolic health, although the authors noted that the available studies were generally small and called for larger randomized controlled trials.

== Reception ==
Seed cycling has received mixed reactions. Media outlets such as The Telegraph, The Cut, and Good Housekeeping have expressed skepticism, questioning its scientific basis and referring to it as a wellness “obsession.” Some health professionals have noted that nutrients in seeds could support hormone regulation but emphasize that scientific evidence remains limited. Despite this, seed cycling has become increasingly popular, particularly within integrative health and wellness communities. Vogue publications have reported on the practice positively, describing it as part of broader women's wellness trends.

== See also ==
- Polyendocrine metabolic ovarian syndrome (PMOS) – a common cause of irregular menstrual cycles
- Functional foods
- Dietary supplements
- Integrative medicine
