= Mary Scullion =

American Roman Catholic religious sister and activist

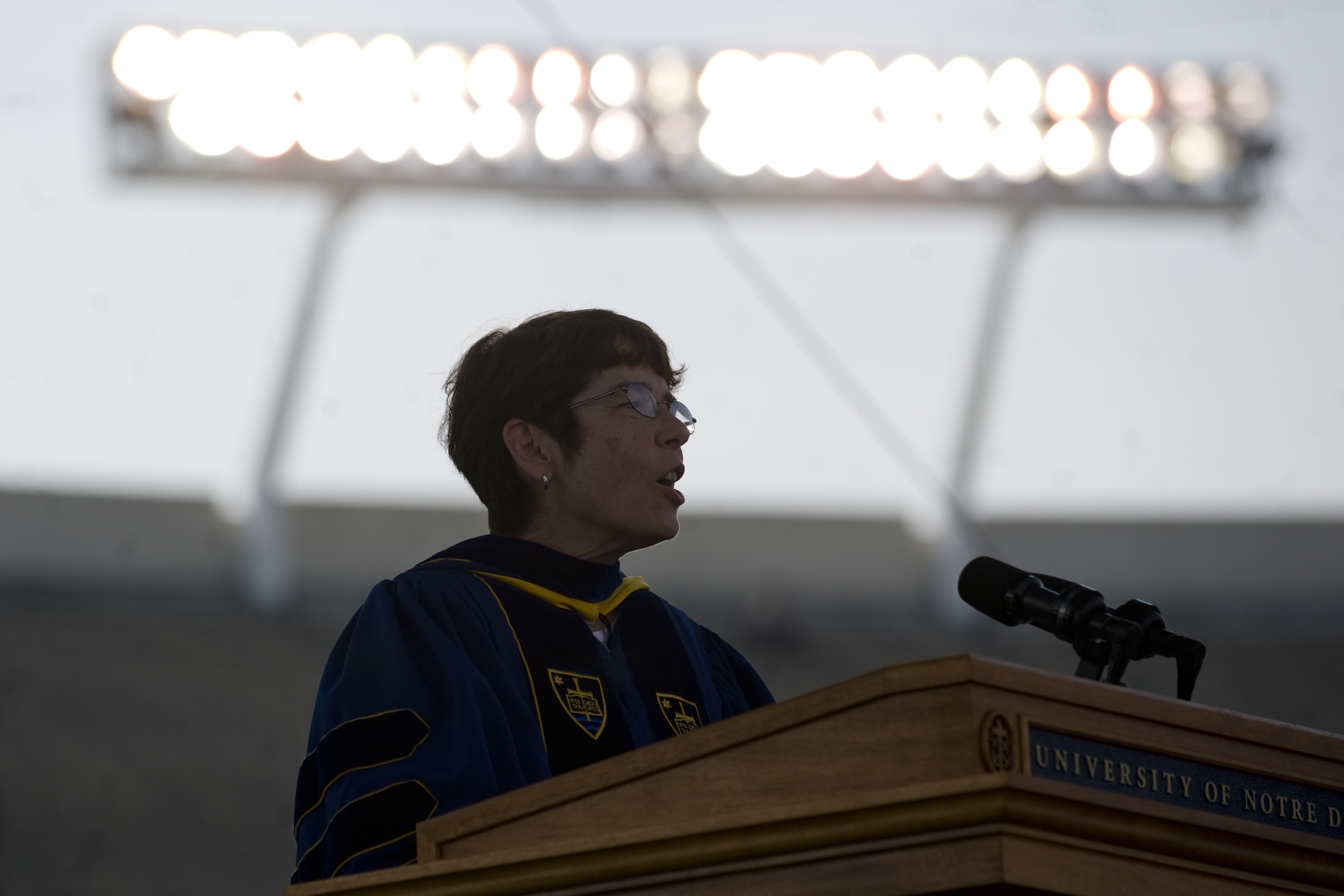
- Awards: Laetare Medal (2011); Philadelphia Award (1991); Time 100 (2009)

Sister Mary Scullion, R.S.M., is a Philadelphia-based American Roman Catholic religious sister and activist, and the co-founder, executive director and president of Project H.O.M.E. She was named by TIME as one of the "100 Most Influential People in the World" in 2009. In 2011, Scullion received the Laetare Medal, the highest award given to an American Catholic.

Scullion has helped to found a number of organizations to address homelessness in Philadelphia, including Project H.O.M.E., which focuses on affordable housing ("H"), opportunities for employment ("O"), medical care ("M"), and education ("E"). With a staff of 450, Project H.O.M.E. provides 1,000 units of housing as well as other services through its 20 residences. More than 95 percent of those helped do not return to homelessness. Scullion's work has had a major impact in Philadelphia and is seen as a model for other cities. She officially retired as of Dec. 31, 2024 but will continue to be involved with the leadership transition of the organization until June 30, 2025.

== Education ==
Scullion attended Little Flower Catholic High School for Girls in Philadelphia, where she became aware of the work of the Sisters of Mercy. She volunteered at Camp Ozanam, a summer camp run by the sisters for underprivileged children.

Scullion attended Temple University for one year before transferring to St. Joseph’s University where she earned a Bachelor’s degree in psychology in 1976. She returned to Temple University and earned a Master’s degree in social work from the School of Social Administration in 1986.

Scullion joined the Sisters of Mercy at age 19 in 1972, while a student at St. Joseph’s. She professed temporary vows in 1975, and final vows in 1980.

== Career ==
During her time at St. Joseph's, Scullion volunteered at St. John’s Hospice in Philadelphia, a local soup kitchen. While men were the predominant population, there were also women with nowhere to go. The Sisters responded by setting up cots for the women at St. Rita’s, a local bingo hall, to give them a place to sleep. It was the beginning of Scullion's homeless ministry.

She was particularly inspired by the words of Dorothy Day, Mother Teresa, and Basque Jesuit priest Pedro Arrupe at the 41st International Eucharistic Congress, in Philadelphia in 1976.

After joining the Sisters of Mercy, Scullion began working at Mercy Hospice, which was founded by the Sisters of Mercy in 1976. Under the auspices of the Philadelphia Archdiocese, the Hospice offered shelter to women, including those with mental illness.

In 1978, at her own request, Scullion spent a week-long mandatory yearly retreat living as a homeless woman on the streets of Philadelphia. She slept, ate, and used restrooms wherever she could, learning first-hand what it meant to be homeless. The sense of urgency she felt has informed her service work and advocacy for the homeless and mentally ill.

In 1985 Scullion co-founded Woman of Hope to provide support and permanent residences for mentally ill women who would otherwise be homeless.

In 1988, Scullion founded the Outreach Coordination Center, the nation's first program that coordinated city private and public agencies to assist people living on the streets with special needs in finding housing and shelter in a more systematic way.

Also in 1988, Scullion met Joan Dawson McConnon, then a student at Drexel University who volunteered at Mercy Hospice. In 1989, the two women co-founded Project H.O.M.E., now a nationally recognized organization that provides supportive housing, employment, education, and health care to enable chronically homeless and low-income persons to break the cycle of homelessness and poverty in Philadelphia. Under their guiding vision, "None of us are home until all of us are home", Project H.O.M.E. is committed to ending and preventing chronic street homelessness.

Project H.O.M.E. has grown from an emergency winter shelter to providing over 1,000 units of housing in 20 residences. Small businesses provide employment to formerly homeless persons. Through the Honickman Learning Center and Comcast Technology Labs, a state-of-the-art technology center in North Central Philadelphia, Project H.O.M.E. offers after-school enrichment opportunities for students, a college access program, and educational and occupational programming for adults. In 2015, Project H.O.M.E. opened the Stephen Klein Wellness Center, a federally qualified health center (FQHC) that provides integrated health care including primary care, behavioral health, dental, a YMCA, pharmacy and wellness services.

Sister Mary is also a powerful voice on political issues affecting homelessness and mentally ill persons. As an activist, Scullion has led demonstrations at City Hall and camped at 30th Street Station. She has been arrested for civil disobedience for giving food to people experiencing homelessness at 30th Street Station. Her advocacy efforts have helped to establish the right of homeless persons to vote.

In 1990, Project HOME tried to expand to 1515 Fairmount Avenue. The move met with opposition from politicians including Vincent Fumo and then-Mayor Ed Rendell, resulting in a protracted court battle. Scullion's advocacy efforts led to a landmark federal court decision that affects the fair housing rights of persons with disabilities. In 2010, she was nominated by Mayor Michael Nutter to serve on the City of Philadelphia's five-person Board of Ethics.

Scullion is a trustee at Saint Joseph's University in Philadelphia. She serves on the board of The Jon Bon Jovi Soul Foundation. Jon Bon Jovi has referred to her as his "patron saint". She has also been called a "street angel".

== Awards/honors/affiliations ==
Sister Mary has received numerous awards and honorary doctorates for her leadership in the City of Philadelphia, including The Philadelphia Award in 1991. She received the Judge Edward R. Becker Citizenship Award from the Center for Law and Society at the Community College of Philadelphia in 2009. She was selected as The Philadelphia Inquirer's Citizen of the Year in 2011. In 2018, she served as the Grand Marshall of the City of Philadelphia's St. Patrick's Day Parade. The Parade's theme for the year was "St. Patrick, Bless Those Who Respond to the Call of the Needy".

In 2002 Scullion and Joan Dawson McConnon were national awardees of the Ford Foundation's prestigious "Leadership for a Changing World Award". Scullion was also selected as an Eisenhower Fellow in 2002, and named an Eisenhower Distinguished Fellow in 2010. In 2009, Scullion was named by TIME as one of the year's "100 Most Influential People in the World", alongside Michelle Obama and Oprah Winfrey.

In 2011, Scullion and McConnon received the Laetare Medal from the University of Notre Dame, the highest award given to an American Catholic. In 2013, Sister Mary was awarded the James Cardinal Gibbons Award from The Catholic University of America.

She was the commencement speaker at Georgetown University's graduation ceremonies on May 20, 2017. She has received honorary doctorates from Georgetown University (2017) and the University of Pennsylvania (2020).

On June 27, 2025 the 900 block of Judson Street in North Philadelphia was renamed as "Sister Mary Scullion Way" in dedication to her service to the city.
