= Project H.O.M.E. =

U.S. non-profit organization

Project HOME is a 501(c)(3) non-profit organization that provides housing, opportunities for employment, medical care, and education to homeless and low-income persons in Philadelphia, Pennsylvania.

The mission of the Project HOME community is "to empower adults, children, and families to break the cycle of homelessness and poverty, to alleviate the underlying causes of poverty, and to enable all of us to attain our fullest potential as individuals and as members of the broader society". Project HOME works to achieve this mission through a continuum of care, which provides individuals a range of supportive services suited to their particular degree of self-sufficiency.

The work of Project HOME is rooted in a belief in "the dignity of each person" and "the transformational power of building relationships and community". Project HOME is a vision-centered organization that believes "none of us are home until all of us are home".

== History ==
=== Co-founders and beginnings ===
Sister Mary Scullion and Joan Dawson McConnon co-founded Project HOME in 1989. Their work together began in the winter of 1988, when they opened a temporary shelter in a vacant recreation center donated by the City of Philadelphia benefitting chronically homeless men. With start-up funds from the Connelly Foundation, Scullion and McConnon were able to expand their efforts and found Project HOME the following year.

=== 1515 Fairmount: creating legal precedent and permanent housing ===
Project HOME gained national recognition for its four-year political and legal battle to open a residence for formerly homeless individuals at 1515 Fairmount Avenue. Though the property's zoning permit was secured from the project's onset in 1990, neighborhood associations slowed the development process when they sought to overturn the building permit in the courts. With the issue still unresolved in December 1992, the U.S. Justice Department sued the City of Philadelphia, on behalf of Project HOME, for violation of Fair Housing laws, which required the City to provide reasonable modifications in the building permits for the people with mental and physical disabilities who would live at 1515 Fairmount. As the case continued in the court system, Project HOME undertook substantial acts of advocacy to attract media attention including community petitions and a vigil outside the Mayor's office that ended in 23 arrests for civil disobedience. After several steps in the appeals process, the final verdict came from a U.S. Court of Appeals in June 1994. The court ruled in favor of Project HOME and "reasonable accommodation". 1515 Fairmount is now home to a 48-unit single room occupancy facility.

== Programs ==
=== Street outreach ===
In partnership with the City and other service providers, Project HOME's Outreach Coordination Center (OCC) oversees all outreach to people living on the streets of Philadelphia. Response workers attempt to build long-term, trusting relationships with people experiencing homelessness and gradually lead them toward seeking help. Outreach teams work almost around the clock, seven days per week, with additional teams out during summer and winter weather emergencies.

=== Housing ===
Project HOME provides a range of supportive housing for all phases of recovery including safe havens, transitional housing and permanent supportive housing. The level of supportive services, such as case management and on-site medical care, varies based on individual need. Project HOME believes that more affordable, permanent housing is the most cost-effective solution to ending chronic homelessness.

=== Employment initiatives ===
The Adult Learning and Workforce Development program engages residents with employment services including job readiness clubs, career fairs, resume writing classes, dress for success workshops, customer service training and job placement with community partners. Project HOME also sponsors employment experience for youth in North Central Philadelphia. The John and Sheila Connors Youth Employment Program sponsors summer internships for neighborhood teens in Project HOME offices and other community offices and the Harold A. Honickman Young Entrepreneurs Program gives teens the opportunity to create and run their own small businesses.

Project HOME also provides some residents with employment experience at its small businesses: Our Daily Threads thrift store and the HOME Page Café. The Café, located in the lobby of the Central Branch of the Free Library of Philadelphia, is a partnership between Project HOME, the Free Library and Bank of America. It serves Starbucks coffee and baked goods from Metropolitan Bakery. The Free Library also employs Project HOME residents through the Library Restroom Attendants program, in which employees perform light cleaning and maintenance and provide information about homeless services to anyone in need.

The Home Page Café closed permanently in 2016.

=== Educational resources ===
Opened in December 2003, the Honickman Learning Center and Comcast Technology Labs is a 38,000-square-foot (3,500 m^{2}) educational facility in North Central Philadelphia featuring 225 computers, high-tech meeting spaces and Smart Boards in each classroom. The Learning Center is home to an after-school program with comprehensive literacy instruction; a resource center for grandparents raising children; GED and basic technology classes; digital media, art and music instruction; and the Community Partnership School, an independent grade school for neighborhood children run by Germantown Academy in partnership with Project HOME

=== Advocacy ===
Project HOME seeks to ensure that all members of its community have a voice in the political process. The organization helps and encourages residents to advocate for themselves and educate policy makers about the issues of poverty, homelessness, mental illness and addiction. Project HOME's successful advocacy initiatives include the 1515 Fairmount legal battle, the Vote for Homes Coalition, a campaign that trains volunteers to register homeless and low-income voters, and the 1998 negotiation of the Sidewalk Behavior Ordinance. As a result of activism by the homeless advocacy community, Philadelphia City Council passed a version of the ordinance that did not criminalize living on the streets; required police to contact an outreach worker before issuing a citation to a homeless person; and provided additional funding for the Outreach Coordination Center and supportive housing.

== Recognition and awards ==
Project HOME's work has been recognized as a model for ending homelessness by news organizations across the country including The New York Times, the San Francisco Chronicle, The Denver Post, and The Philadelphia Inquirer. U.S. Secretary of Housing and Urban Development Shaun Donovan has stated that the work of Sister Mary Scullion in Philadelphia exemplifies supportive housing as a good investment more "than anywhere else in the country".
