= Joe Lunardi =

American college basketball commentator

- Born: Philadelphia, Pennsylvania, U.S.
- Education: Saint Joseph's University, 1982
- Employer(s): ESPN; Saint Joseph's University
- Spouse: Pam Lunardi
- Children: 2
- Website: Bracketology with Joe Lunardi

Joseph Lunardi is an American college basketball analyst for ESPN.

He was born in Philadelphia, attended Saint Joseph's Preparatory School in Philadelphia, as well as Damien High School in California, and graduated from St. Joseph's University in 1982, where he served as the sports editor for the campus newspaper. After a brief stint as a freelance sports writer and in communications at Temple University, he took the position of director of media relations for St. Joseph's in 1987. He later served as director of external relations, director of university communications, assistant vice president for marketing communications, vice president for marketing and communications, and finally director of marketing and broadcast services before leaving St. Joseph's administration in 2019.

He is best known for creating bracketology, which he calls the "art and science" of predicting the teams that will be selected in the annual NCAA Men's Basketball Tournament. This started as part of his work in the Blue Ribbon College Basketball Yearbook, where he became managing editor in 1991. To launch a new guide to the tournament in 1995, his team needed to preview the potential teams which would make the NCAA men's basketball tournament. After the first edition where he evaluated 100 teams, of which only 64 made the tournament, he began making projections in 1996 to ESPN.com in exchange for publicity for the Yearbook.

Since 1997, he is the resident bracketologist for ESPN and took on a full time role in 2019. In addition to his duties at ESPN, he has served as color commentator for men's basketball for the Saint Joseph's Hawks since 1990. Lunardi correctly predicted all 65 teams to appear in the 2008 NCAA tournament.

Lunardi has stated that his first bracket for ESPN received 250,000 hits in the first 90 minutes posted. His brackets sometimes receive millions of hits over the course of a season. Since then, he has been a fixture on ESPN's Bracketology program and on SportsCenter, especially during the months of February and March in the run-up to the NCAA Tournament.

As of 2021, Lunardi has homes in Ocean City, New Jersey and Drexel Hill, Pennsylvania.
