= Richard Sandomir =

American journalist (born 1957)

- Born: September 4, 1957 (age 68)
- Education: Queens College, City University of New York
- Spouse: Griffin Miller
- Writing career
- Genre: Sports
- Notable work: The Pride of the Yankees

Richard Elliot Sandomir (born September 4, 1957) is an American journalist who is an obituary writer for The New York Times. He wrote about sports, male-pattern hair loss and television; he is the author of several books including Bald Like Me: The Hair-Raising Adventures of Baldman and The Enlightened Bracketologist: The Final Four of Everything.

== Education and family ==
Sandomir obtained his degree from Queens College, City University of New York. His wife, Griffin Miller, is an artist and writer.

== Career ==
Sandomir was a freelance writer and focused his work on sports for a number of publications which include: The New York Times, the Los Angeles Times, the Washington Post, Sports Illustrated, and Sports. He also worked for Sports Inc. as a staff writer, a business reporter for New York Newsday, a staff writer for the Stamford Advocate, and a business writer for Financial World.

Sandomir worked for The New York Times as a television, sports, and business reporter from April 1991 to 2016.

== Books ==
- Bald Like Me: The Hair-Raising Adventures of Baldman, Collier Books, 1990, ISBN 9780020366508, OCLC 21376329
- Friendly Persuasion- Putnam, 1990
- The Joy of Baldness: Men With Less Hair and the Women Who Love Them, Spi Books, 1993.
- The Pride of the Yankees: Lou Gehrig, Gary Cooper, and the Making of a Classic. Hachette Books. June 13, 2017. ISBN 978-0-316-35516-2. OCLC 958797744

Books with Mark Reiter

- The Final Four of Everything- Simon & Schuster, 2009, ISBN 9781439126080, OCLC 317697822
- The Enlightened Bracketologist: The Final Four of Everything. Bloomsbury Publishing. December 9, 2008. ISBN 978-1-59691-947-1.

Books with Rick Wolff

- Don't Worry, Stop Sweating...Use Deodorant- Andrews Mcmeel Pub, 1998, ISBN 9780836265095, OCLC 38410284
- Life for Real Dummies - Perennial, 1996, ISBN 9780060952075, OCLC 59666861
