= Miller & Chevalier =

Tax Law Firm in Washington, D.C. United States

- Headquarters: Washington, D.C.
- Major practice areas: Tax, Employee Benefits, International Law and Business, White Collar and Internal Investigations, Complex Litigation, and Government Affairs
- Founder: Robert N. Miller

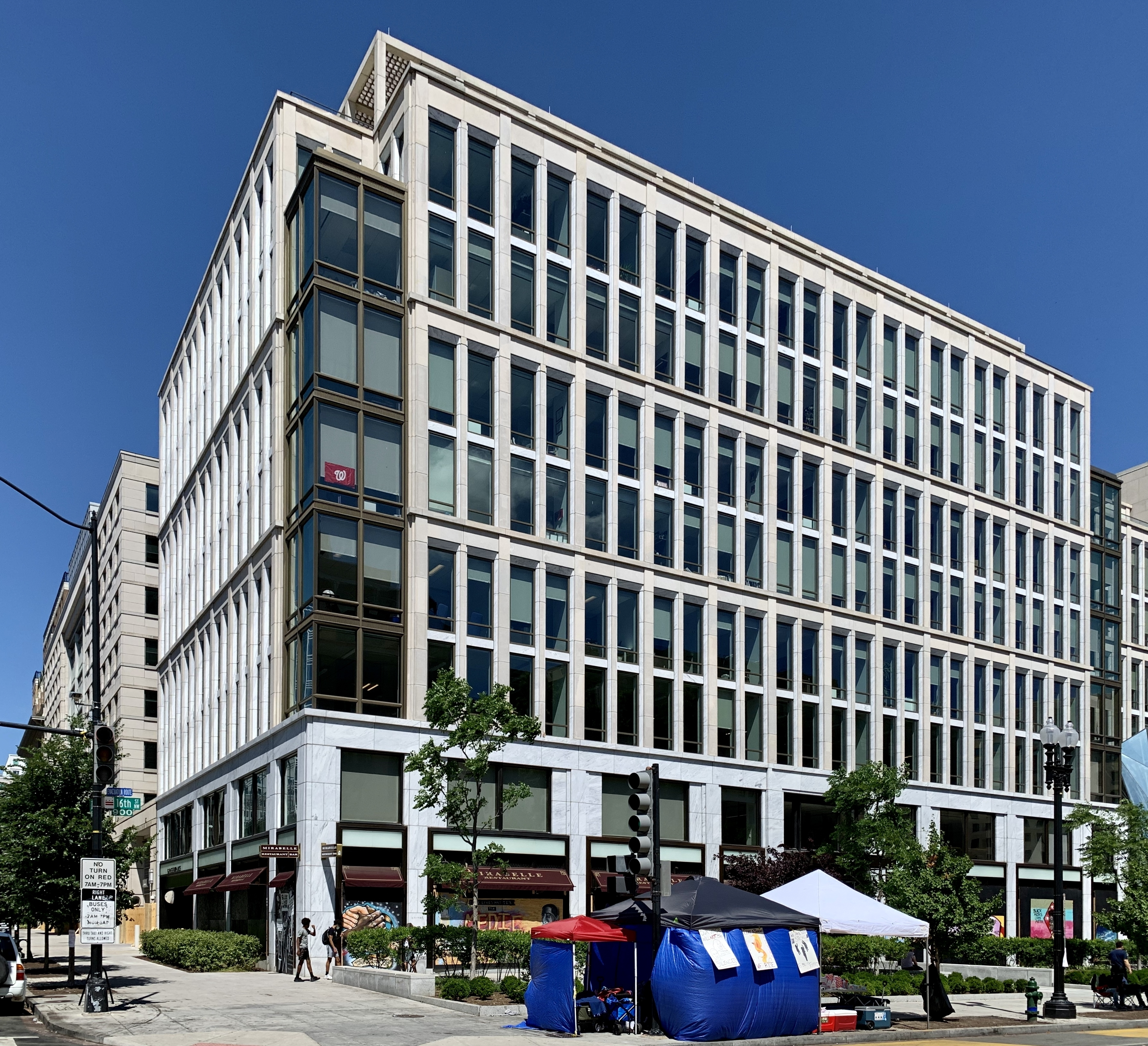
Miller & Chevalier offices in Washington, D.C.

Miller & Chevalier is a Washington, D.C. law firm founded in 1920. They have practices in Tax, Employee Benefits (including ERISA), International Law and Business, White Collar and Internal Investigations, Complex Litigation, and Government Affairs.

Miller & Chevalier is located at 900 16th Street NW, Washington, D.C. 20006.

== History ==
Miller & Chevalier was founded in 1920 by Robert N. Miller, a tax attorney who had served as solicitor of the Bureau of Internal Revenue under President Woodrow Wilson. It is considered the first federal tax practice established in the United States.

== Organization of American States investigation ==
In December 2022, Miller & Chevalier was retained by the Organization of American States (OAS) to conduct an independent investigation into allegations of misconduct against Secretary General Luis Almagro, following reports of an undisclosed relationship with a subordinate staffer. The firm submitted its report to the OAS Permanent Council in April 2023, finding that Almagro had shown poor judgment but had not favored the staffer in salary or personnel decisions; the Council approved the report and its recommendations by consensus.
