= The Swamp (2020 film) =

- Directed by: Daniel DiMauro; Morgan Pehme
- Written by: Daniel DiMauro; Morgan Pehme; Marc Vives
- Starring: Matt Gaetz; Thomas Massie; Ken Buck; Ro Khanna; Lawrence Lessig
- Cinematography: Stefan Wiesen
- Edited by: Marc Vives
- Music by: Kyle Scott Wilson
- Production companies: HBO Documentary Films; The Intellectual Property Corporation
- Distributed by: HBO Films
- Release date: August 4, 2020
- Running time: 104 minutes
- Country: United States
- Language: English

The Swamp is a 2020 American documentary film about the fundraising and political culture on Capitol Hill in Washington, D.C. Released in August 2020 on HBO, it chronicles the activities of three Republican congressmen. Matt Gaetz of Florida, Thomas Massie of Kentucky and Ken Buck of Colorado are portrayed as outsiders to the dominant party patronage system. The film takes place largely in 2019 and chronicles their reactions to the biggest political stories of that year along with commentary on the political climate of Washington D.C.

== Synopsis ==
The film details how heavily the Republican and Democratic parties rely on lobbyists for financial support. It describes a system where those members of Congress who are most effective at fundraising for their party are rewarded with committee assignments. The film uses interview clips and narration from Lawrence Lessig of Harvard Law School to provide background information. Lessig primarily faults former Speaker of the House Newt Gingrich for the political climate of Capitol Hill, alleging he shifted Congress's priorities from legislating to fundraising in the 1990s and deprioritized bipartisanship. The Swamp proves critical of the first Trump administration, despite the film's three main characters being staunch defenders of it, with the administration's ties to various lobbyists portrayed negatively.

Gaetz is cast at the center of the story. His upbringing, unsuccessful attempt to amend the National Defense Authorization Act with Democrat Ro Khanna of California and interactions with supporters and detractors are featured. In The Swamp, Gaetz is contrasted with the film's critiques of Gingrich and the Trump administration, with his refusal to accept PAC money and work with California Democrats Khanna and Katie Hill, who had resigned from Congress due to a scandal which Gaetz defends her from, providing examples of bipartisanship and "draining the swamp" of Washington, D.C.

== Reception ==
On review aggregator Rotten Tomatoes, The Swamp holds an approval rating of 67% based on 15 reviews with an average rating of 6.4 out of 10. The site's critical consensus reads: "Interesting but unfocused, The Swamp's multi-subject approach opens the floor for a lot of questions - and answers very few."

Hank Stuever of The Washington Post was complimentary of the documentary for its willingness to utilize Matt Gaetz's perspective, writing: "This candid glimpse into Gaetz’s world may come as something of an unctuous surprise to HBO’s typical documentary viewer, who is used to being served agreeable agenda items from the left side of the menu." Bill Goodykoontz of The Arizona Republic gave the film a 3.5 out of 5 stars, writing: "It turns out to be all talk for the most part, but it is an interesting conversation, and an intriguing, if sometimes flawed, film."

== See also ==
- Drain the swamp – metaphorical phrase expressing a wish to purge something or somewhere of corruption.
