= Morgan Pehme =

American film director

- Born: May 5, 1978 (age 48); New York City
- Occupations: Journalist, filmmaker, political commentator
- Known for: Get Me Roger Stone

Morgan Pehme (born May 5, 1978 in New York City) is an American filmmaker and journalist.

== Background ==
Pehme's father was journalist Kalev Pehme. On his paternal side, his grandfather, Karl Pehme, was a sculptor from Estonia. His grandmother, Guerel Oulanoff, was a pianist of Kalmyk descent.

As a child, Pehme achieved renown for his success as a chess player.

Pehme attended The Dalton School. He was a character in the book Searching for Bobby Fischer and was subsequently depicted in the film.

Pehme won the 1993 National Junior High School Chess Championship. He represented the United States in the Boys Under 12 section of the 1990 World Youth Chess Festival for Peace in Fond du Lac, Wisconsin.

His participation in the event led to him become one of the subjects of director Lynn Hamrick's 1996 documentary, Chess Kids, as well as Hamrick's 2011 sequel to the film.

== Career ==
=== Film ===
Pehme began his career as a filmmaker as an executive producer of the narrative film Exist (2004), directed by Esther Bell.

The next year, Pehme produced Nightmare, which he co-wrote with the film's director, Dylan Bank. Pehme and Bank were awarded the jury prize for Best Screenplay from the 2006 Austin Fantastic Fest. The film was released in the United States by IFC Films.

Pehme made his directorial debut with Nothing Sacred (2012), a fantasy horror film starring William Sadler, Thierry Lhermitte, Philippe Nahon, Eric Godon, Debbie Rochon, Naama Kates and Alan Barnes Netherton.

In 2017, Pehme co-directed, produced and wrote the Netflix Original documentary Get Me Roger Stone, which explores the life and career of conservative strategist Roger Stone, who played an integral role in Donald Trump's election as President of the United States. The film, which took Pehme and his co-directors Daniel DiMauro and Dylan Bank five years to make, premiered at the 2017 Tribeca Film Festival.

In 2020, Pehme again explored Trump's inner circle with Slumlord Millionaire, about White House senior advisor Jared Kushner, Trump's son-in-law. Pehme directed and produced the documentary with Daniel DiMauro as an episode of Dirty Money, a Netflix Original documentary series executive produced by Academy Award-winning filmmaker Alex Gibney.

That same year, Pehme directed, wrote and produced The Swamp for HBO Documentary Films. The film explores the dysfunction plaguing the United States Congress, tracking three Republican members of Congress, Matt Gaetz of Florida, Thomas Massie of Kentucky, and Ken Buck of Colorado, throughout 2019.

=== Journalism and Politics ===
Early in Pehme's journalism career, he served as a columnist and managing editor for The Queens Courier, a community newspaper.

Later, Pehme wrote The Brooklyn Optimist, a blog about Brooklyn. In September 2008, Pehme, a critic of Brooklyn Democratic Chairman Vito Lopez, was elected to represent a portion of Greenpoint, Brooklyn as a County Committee Member in the Kings County Democratic Party.

In 2011, Pehme was named one of City Hall's Rising Stars Under 40 for his work as executive director of New York Civic, a group founded by former New York City Parks Commissioner Henry Stern.

In 2012, Pehme was hired as editor-in-chief of the newspaper City & State, which covers New York politics. During Pehme's tenure, City & State won a number of New York State Press Association awards, including Best Coverage of Elections/Politics, 2013, for which he was personally recognized, along with Nick Powell, Jon Lentz and Aaron Short.

In 2015, Morgan Pehme was hired as executive director of EffectiveNY, a nonpartisan government watchdog group founded by businessman Bill Samuels. He also produced and co-hosted with Samuels the radio show "Effective Radio with Bill Samuels", which aired on AM970 in New York. New York Nonprofit Media named Pehme to its 2017 class of 40 Under 40 Rising Stars of the New York nonprofit world for his work at EffectiveNY.

Pehme is a former adjunct professor of mass communications, journalism, TV and film at St. John's University.

He has contributed articles to numerous publications, including The New York Times, The Washington Post, New York Daily News, HuffPost, The Hill, and The Daily Beast.

Pehme is an on-camera political analyst for PIX11. He serves on the board of advisors of the Museum of Political Corruption.
