= Get Me Roger Stone =

- Film poster
- Directed by: Dylan Bank; Daniel DiMauro; Morgan Pehme
- Written by: Dylan Bank; Daniel DiMauro; Morgan Pehme
- Produced by: Daniel DiMauro; Kara Elverson; Blair Foster; Shirel Kozak; Frank Morano; Morgan Pehme; Fredrik Stanton
- Starring: Roger Stone
- Cinematography: Dylan Bank; Sam Cullman; Daniel DiMauro; Ronan Killeen; Antonio Rossi
- Edited by: Daniel DiMauro; Jason Pollard
- Music by: Mark Degli Antoni; Kyle S. Wilson
- Distributed by: Netflix
- Release dates: April 23, 2017 (Tribeca Film Festival); May 12, 2017 (United States)
- Running time: 92 minutes
- Country: United States
- Language: English

Get Me Roger Stone is a 2017 American documentary film written and directed by Dylan Bank, Daniel DiMauro and Morgan Pehme. The film explores the life and career of Republican political strategist and lobbyist Roger Stone, a longtime advisor to Donald Trump. The film was released on Netflix on May 12, 2017.

== Background ==
Bank, DiMauro and Pehme began filming with Roger Stone in late 2011 after Pehme had met Stone at a political function. Inspired by a New Yorker article by writer Jeffrey Toobin, the filmmakers embarked on a five-year journey to make a documentary about Stone in order to tell the story of his transformative effect on modern politics–which reaches its climax in 2016 with the election of Donald Trump to the Presidency of the United States of America.

== Release ==
The film premiered at the Tribeca Film Festival on April 23, 2017, to critical acclaim. Entertainment Weekly called it a "staggering, shock-to-the-system political documentary." The Atlantic described it as "an incisive portrait of how Stone's brand of dirty tricks–in which the only motivating factor in politics is to win–came to dominate the current state of disarray." The film was released worldwide on Netflix on May 12, 2017.

== Reception ==
Get Me Roger Stone has an 88% approval rating on Rotten Tomatoes, based on 32 reviews. The website's critical consensus reads, "As informative as it is entertaining, Get Me Roger Stone offers a close-up look at the right-wing gadfly who helped shape the 2016 presidential election." Metacritic gives the film a weighted average score of 75 out of 100, based on 8 critics, indicating "generally favorable" reviews.

The Los Angeles Times hailed it as "endlessly fascinating," and Variety as "lively, fun, sickening and essential." RogerEbert.com proclaimed "as for examining the pathologies on the right side of the spectrum, it's hard to imagine any film this year will surpass the astonishing Netflix production Get Me Roger Stone."

== Participants ==
- Roger Stone
- Donald Trump
- Paul Manafort
- Jeffrey Toobin
- Jane Mayer
- Alex Jones
- Tucker Carlson
- Wayne Barrett
- Michael Caputo
- Matt Labash
- Harry Siegel
- Timothy Stanley
- Charlie Black
- Mike Murphy
