= Adrian Benepe =

14th Commissioner of the New York City Department of Parks & Recreation

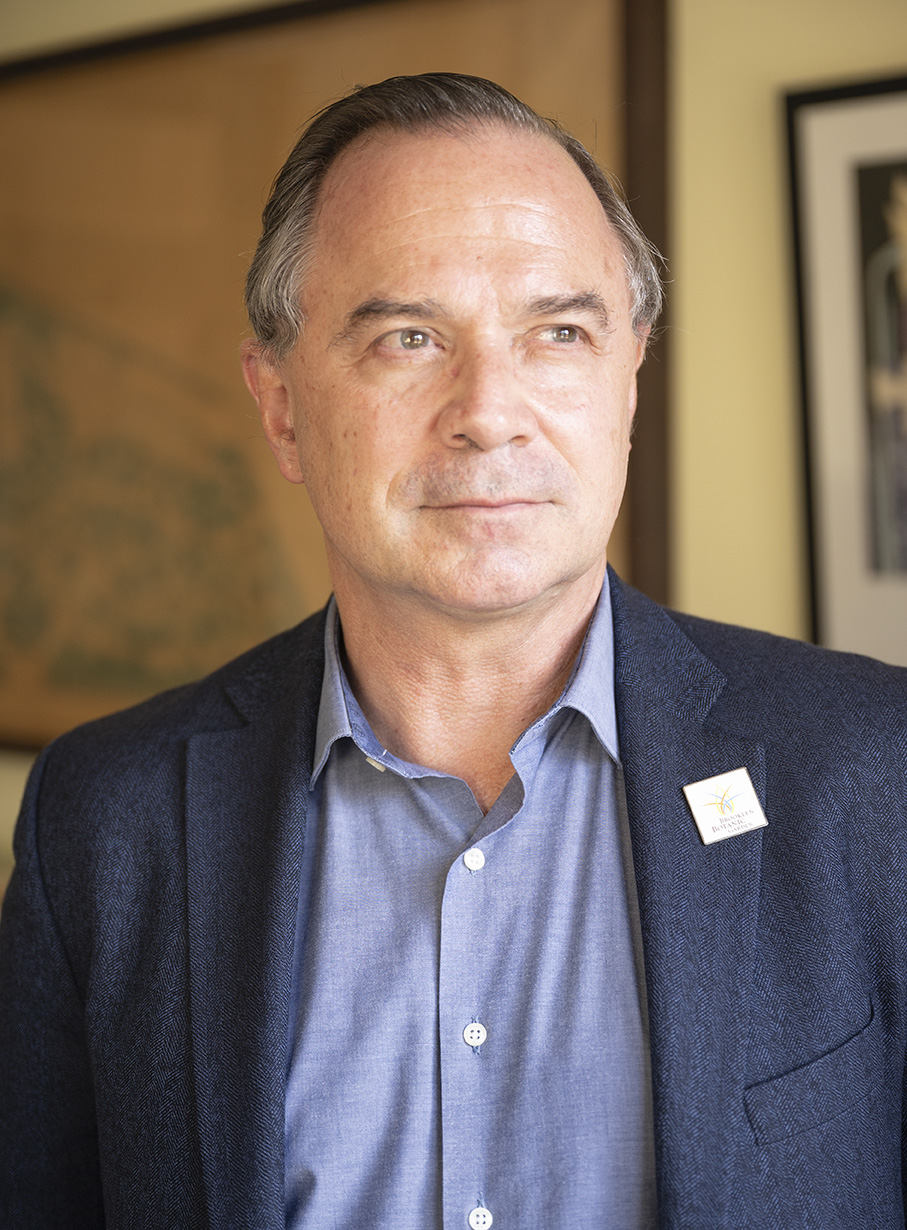
- Benepe in 2022

Parks Commissioner of New York City
- In office February 4, 2002 – August 29, 2012
- Appointed by: Michael Bloomberg
- Preceded by: Henry Stern
- Succeeded by: Veronica M. White

Personal details
- Born: March 8, 1957 (age 69)
- Spouse: Charlotte Glasser
- Children: 2
- Parent: Barry Benepe (father)
- Education: Middlebury College; Columbia University

Adrian Benepe was the 14th Commissioner of the New York City Department of Parks & Recreation, serving in that role from February 4, 2002, to August 29, 2012, under Mayor Michael Bloomberg. During his tenure, he oversaw 7,000 parks' staff, the expenditure of over $3 billion in funding park maintenance, the expansion of new parks across New York City, and the inclusion of schoolyards for public access after school.

After retiring from the Parks Department, Benepe joined The Trust for Public Land as Senior Vice President and Director of City Park Development, where he worked in parks advocacy and promotion of the 10-Minute Walk across the United States.

Benepe served as President & CEO of Brooklyn Botanic Garden from October 2020 until October 2025. He is currently managing director and chief development officer of the Fort Tryon Park Conservancy

== Early life and education ==
Benepe lived most of his life in Manhattan in New York City. He received a B.A. in English Literature from Middlebury College, Vermont, in 1979, and an M.A. in journalism at Columbia University in 1981, among many family members who attended the university.

== Career ==
Benepe held numerous positions with the Urban Park Rangers in the New York City department of Parks and Recreation from 1979 to 1990. This included the ranger station in New York City's Central Park. He went on to work at the New York Botanical Garden, where, with a colleague, he developed the idea that became the annual winter train show. He then went to the Municipal Art Society.

=== Government and public service ===
Benepe was the Parks Commissioner for New York City from February 4, 2002, to August 29, 2012, the longest to serve in that position since Robert Moses.

During his tenure as Parks Commissioner, he oversaw The Gates, the public arts project from artists Christo and Jeanne-Claude and the public-private partnerships that led to the High Line Park and Brooklyn Bridge Park. It was also during his tenure that then Mayor Michael Bloomberg's PlaNYC started the ambitious project of building and renovating countless urban parks and green spaces for the increase in population across New York City.

=== Nonprofit service ===
After retiring from the Parks Department, Benepe continued working with urban parks at the nonprofit Trust for Public Land, where he became a senior vice president of city park development. It was there that work promoting a 10-Minute Walk to a park or green space for all people in the United States began.

On September 9, 2020, the Brooklyn Botanic Garden announced that it selected Benepe as its new president and CEO. In an email newsletter announcing the move, Brooklyn Botanic Garden board chair Diane Steinberg wrote that Benepe “is a visionary horticultural leader whose work embodies a belief that access to plants, green spaces, and nature should be available to all, especially neighborhoods and communities that have historically been neglected in urban planning.”

As of October 7, 2025, the Brooklyn Botanic Garden announced in an email to supporters that Adrian Benepe has concluded his tenure as President & CEO of BBG to pursue new opportunities.

== Personal life ==
Benepe is married to Charlotte Glasser, with whom he lives on the Upper West Side. They are the parents of two sons.

Political offices
| Preceded by Henry Stern | Parks Commissioner of New York City; 2002–2012 | Succeeded by Veronica M. White |
