= Fredrik Stanton =

American author and filmmaker

Fredrick Stanton
- Born: 1973 (age 52–53)
- Education: Columbia University
- Occupations: writer, documentarian
- Notable work: Great Negotiations: Agreements that Changed the Modern World

Fredrik Stanton was born in 1973. He is an American author, political scientist, and filmmaker.

== Early life ==
Stanton attended Columbia University, graduating with a B.A. in political science. He was a member of the fraternity of St. Anthony Hall and was president and publisher for the Columbia Daily Spectator. He was selected as John C. Whitehead Fellow of the Foreign Policy Association.

He has served as an election monitor in Armenia, the Republic of Georgia, Bosnia, Kosovo and Azerbaijan.

== Career ==
Stanton has written pieces for the Boston Herald, Forbes.com, Politico, The Washington Post's website, United Nation Association's A Global Agenda. He has also appeared on C-Span's Washington Journal and Voice of America.

=== Great Negotiations ===
Stanton's book Great Negotiations: Agreements that Changed the Modern World was published in 2010. The book was noted as unusual for focusing on negotiating content and the diplomatic process, rather than the direct major policy results or the diplomatic developments which resulted from the negotiations discussed therein.

The book presents the negotiations in a story-like format that "reads like fiction" in order to "appeal to both casual historians and those more conversant in international relations and foreign policy." The book has been considered as a learning tool.

It won the Best Non-Fiction book at the Los Angeles Book Festival, Grand Prize at the London Book Festival, and the International Book Award in three categories including world history.

=== Uprising ===
Uprising is a documentary about the 2011 Egyptian revolution. Stanton was director, writer, and producer of the film. The film includes amateur footage of the protests. The Hollywood Reporter's review stated that the film's presentation was straightforward and informative. It premiered at the Beirut International Film Festival, held October 3–11, 2012.

=== Get Me Roger Stone ===
Stanton was a producer for Get Me Roger Stone, a 2017 American documentary film exploring the career of political strategist and lobbyist Roger Stone. The film premiered at the Tribeca Film Festival and has since been available worldwide on Netflix. It garnered critical acclaim and Oscar buzz.
