= Barry Benepe =

American urban planner (1928–2025)

Barry Benepe (21 May 1928 – 23 April 2025) was an American urban planner. He was a key figure in the establishment of farmers' markets in New York City. Benepe was born in Manhattan on 21 May 1928, and died at his residence in Saugerties on 23 April 2025, at the age of 96.
