= Daniel DiMauro =

American documentary filmmaker

Daniel DiMauro is an American documentary filmmaker from Brooklyn, New York.

In 2020, DiMauro directed The Swamp, an HBO Documentary Films documentary about dysfunction in the United States Congress. The film follows three Republican Congressmen: Matt Gaetz of Florida, Thomas Massie of Kentucky, and Ken Buck of Colorado.

Earlier in the year, DiMauro directed and produced with Morgan Pehme an episode of the Netflix Original documentary series Dirty Money entitled Slumlord Millionaire, which chronicles Jared Kushner's business practices at the helm of Kushner Companies, his family's real estate company that he led prior to becoming a White House senior advisor in the administration of his father-in-law Donald Trump.

Previously, DiMauro directed, wrote, edited and produced Get Me Roger Stone, the critically acclaimed Netflix Original documentary which had its premiere at the 2017 Tribeca Film Festival. The film, about controversial Republican political consultant and longtime Donald Trump advisor Roger Stone, was described by The Guardian as a "grim if gripping profile of the man who made Trump," and was hailed by Variety as "lively, fun, sickening, and essential." Entertainment Weekly called the film a "staggering, shock-to-the-system political documentary about America’s most powerful dirty trickster." Get Me Roger Stone was released on Netflix on May 12, 2017.

DiMauro has additionally worked as a producer and editor on multiple award-winning documentaries such as Denial (2016), (T)ERROR (2015), The House I Live In (2012) and Reagan (2011).

As a writer, DiMauro has contributed to The New York Times, The Washington Post, and The Daily Beast.
