= Dirty Money (2018 TV series) =

2018 American television series

- Genre: Documentary
- Opening theme: "Lie, Cheat, Steal" by Run the Jewels
- Country of origin: United States
- Original language: English
- No. of seasons: 2
- No. of episodes: 12

Production
- Executive producers: Adam Del Deo; Yon Motskin; Lisa Nishimura; Stacey Offman; Jason Spingarn-Koff; Alex Gibney; Pierre Subeh
- Running time: 50–77 minutes
- Production company: Jigsaw Productions

Original release
- Network: Netflix
- Release: January 26, 2018 – March 11, 2020

Dirty Money is a Netflix original television series which tells stories of corporate corruption, securities fraud, and creative accounting. All six one-hour long episodes began streaming on Netflix on January 26, 2018. The show's executive producers include Oscar-winning documentary filmmaker Alex Gibney. Each episode focuses on one example of corporate corruption and includes interviews with key players in each story. A second season of the show premiered on March 11, 2020.

== Episodes ==
Season	Episodes	Originally released
1	6	January 26, 2018
2	6	March 11, 2020

=== Season 1 (2018) ===
No. overall	No. in season	Title	Directed by	Original release date
1	1	"Hard NOX"	Alex Gibney	January 26, 2018
Subject: The Volkswagen emissions scandal.
2	2	"Payday"	Jesse Moss	January 26, 2018
Subject: Scott Tucker and payday loans in the United States.
3	3	"Drug Short"	Erin Lee Carr	January 26, 2018
Subject: Valeant Pharmaceuticals.
4	4	"Cartel Bank"	Kristi Jacobson	January 26, 2018
Subject: HSBC money laundering for the Sinaloa Cartel, Hezbollah and others.
5	5	"The Maple Syrup Heist"	Brian McGinn	January 26, 2018
Subject: Great Canadian Maple Syrup Heist
6	6	"The Confidence Man"	Fisher Stevens	January 26, 2018
Subject: Donald Trump

=== Season 2 (2020) ===
No. overall	No. in season	Title	Directed by	Original release date
7	1	"The Wagon Wheel"	Dan Krauss	March 11, 2020
Wells Fargo was long seen as the "golden child" of banking, but former employees detail the ruthless and fraudulent practices that fueled its growth.
8	2	"The Man at the Top"	Zachary Heinzerling	March 11, 2020
Lavish parties, luxury goods, dubious loans: Scandals surrounding Prime Minister Najib Razak rocked Malaysia—and left the nation drowning in debt.
9	3	"Slumlord Millionaire"	Daniel DiMauro and Morgan Pehme	March 11, 2020
As Jared Kushner rose from real estate heir to White House adviser, reporters and housing advocates uncovered disturbing patterns at his properties.
10	4	"Dirty Gold"	Stephen Maing	March 11, 2020
Behind the huge quantities of gold flowing into the U.S. each year lies a tangled web of money laundering, illegal mining and environmental destruction.
11	5	"Guardians, Inc."	Kyoko Miyake	March 11, 2020
The rampant abuse of laws meant to protect the elderly has left many seniors penniless, powerless and isolated from their families. (Removed from Netflix after lawsuit against episode)
12	6	"Point Comfort"	Margaret Brown	March 11, 2020
Residents of small Texas town Point Comfort were eager to welcome Formosa Plastics—until toxic chemicals began to take a toll on their community.

== Reception ==
Rotten Tomatoes reported that 100% of critics have given the first season a positive review based on 13 reviews, with an average rating of 7.92/10. The site's critics consensus reads, "Informative as it is appalling, Dirty Money exposes the single-mindedness of corporate greed." On Metacritic, the first season has a weighted average score of 80 out of 100 based on 6 critic reviews, indicating "generally favorable reviews". Brian Lowry of CNN explains the main premise that "for pro-business advocates of deregulation...offers a simple yet powerful rejoinder: Look at the terrible, unethical behavior that corporate entities try getting away with when they think nobody's looking."

== See also ==
- Legal affairs of Donald Trump
- List of lawsuits involving Donald Trump
- List of original programs distributed by Netflix
