= Drain the swamp =

American political catch phrase

Drain the swamp is a phrase which has frequently been used by politicians since the 1980s and in the U.S. often refers to reducing the influence of special interests and lobbyists. The phrase can allude to the physical draining of swamps which is conducted to keep mosquito populations low in order to combat malaria, prevalent during the time in Washington, D.C., on supposed swampy grounds, as well as being part of land reclamation projects.

== Examples ==
It has been used as a metaphor by:

- Helen Hunt Jackson (1830–1885) who wrote that to "clear the swamp" (the first obvious step to reclaiming "poisonous and swampy wilderness") was an apt metaphor for how to start addressing "the disgrace to us of the present condition of our Indians".
- Winfield R. Gaylord (1870–1943) to describe the socialist desire to "drain" the "capitalist swamp".
- Victor L. Berger (1860–1929), who in his book Broadsides referred to changing the capitalist system as "drain[ing] the swamp".
- A. Philip Randolph (1889–1979) and Bayard Rustin (1912–1987) in A Freedom Budget for All Americans (1966), argued that "The breeding grounds of crime and discontent will be diminished in the same way that draining a swamp cuts down the breeding of mosquitoes, and the causes of discrimination will be considerably reduced."
- Ronald Reagan, who called to "drain the swamp" of bureaucracy in the federal government in 1983 when commissioning the Grace Commission.
- Pat Buchanan during his 2000 presidential campaign, when he invoked the saying in opposition to the dominant political parties: "Neither Beltway party is going to drain this swamp: it's a protected wetland; they breed in it, they spawn in it".
- Jarosław Kaczyński in the leadup to the 2001 Polish parliamentary election.
- Jessica Stern in "Preparing for a War on Terrorism" (November 2001), where she calls on the U.S. to see failing and failed states as sources and sanctuaries for terrorists and terrorism (the swamp) and to use foreign aid and soft power to combat them (the draining).
- Nancy Pelosi in 2006 while announcing her 100-Hour Plan in response to more than a decade of Republican rule.
- Donald Trump to describe his plan to fix problems in the federal government. According to Trump, he resisted using the phrase at first, but after trying it he was so pleased with the crowd's reaction that he "[started] saying it like I meant it". In the three weeks before the 2016 election, he tweeted "Drain the swamp" 79 times, usually as a hashtag, and he tweeted the word "swamp" another 75 times in the four years following that election. His 2020 campaign's senior advisor, Jason Miller, and his 2020 campaign manager, Bill Stepien, referred to the Commission on Presidential Debates as "swamp monsters". Protests against the role of Goldman Sachs alumni in the Trump administration also used the metaphor. Trump said on February 22, 2025, while addressing the Conservative Political Action Conference (CPAC) in Washington, "The illegal aliens are being sent home. We are draining the swamp".
- Traditional Unionist Voice on the front cover of their manifesto for the 2017 Northern Ireland Assembly election
- Henry Bolton, the leader of UKIP when referring to its National Executive Committee (NEC) on 22 January 2018.
- Joni Ernst, a senator from Iowa, proposed a 'Drain the Swamp' bill on December 19 2024 that would relocate 30% of federal workers out of Washington.

== See also ==
- Campaign finance in the United States
- Corruption in the United States
- Inside the Beltway
- Lobbying in the United States
- The Swamp (documentary)
