= Great Negotiations =

2010 book by Fredrik Stanton

Great Negotiations: Agreements that Changed the Modern World
- Author: Fredrik Stanton
- Genre: Non-fiction
- Publication date: 2010

Great Negotiations: Agreements that Changed the Modern World is a 2010 book by Fredrik Stanton which presents narratives from modern diplomacy.

== Publishing ==
Great Negotiations: Agreements that Changed the Modern World was published in 2010. The book was noted as unusual for focusing on negotiating content and the diplomatic process, rather than the direct major policy results or the diplomatic developments which resulted from the negotiations discussed therein.

The book presents the negotiations in a story-like format that "reads like fiction" in order to "appeal to both casual historians and those more conversant in international relations and foreign policy."

== Chapters ==
Each chapter in the book is a narrative of a diplomatic negotiation.

Franklin at the French Court

Describes the Treaty of Alliance (1778) and the roles served by Americans Arthur Lee, Silas Deane, and French Charles Gravier, comte de Vergennes and Conrad Alexandre Gérard de Rayneval.

The Louisiana Purchase

Describes the 1803 Louisiana Purchase and the roles served by French Charles Maurice de Talleyrand-Périgord and François Barbé-Marbois and the Americans James Monroe and Robert Livingston.

The Congress of Vienna

Describes the 1814-15 Congress of Vienna and Britain's Robert Stewart, Viscount Castlereagh, Prussia's Karl August, Grand Duke of Saxe-Weimar-Eisenach, Russia's Karl Nesselrode, France's Charles Maurice de Talleyrand-Périgord, and Austria's Klemens von Metternich.

The Portsmouth Treaty

Describes the Treaty of Portsmouth in 1905 and Theodore Roosevelt the United States, Sergei Witte and Roman Rosen from Russia, and Komura Jutarō and Takahira Kogorō from Japan.

The Paris Peace Conference

Describes the Paris Peace Conference, 1919, and the United States' Woodrow Wilson, France's Georges Clemenceau, Britain's David Lloyd George, Italy's Vittorio Emanuele Orlando.

The Egyptian-Israeli Armistice Agreement

Describes the 1949 Armistice Agreements and the United Nations mediator Ralph Bunche; Egypt's Seif El Dine, Abdul Mustafa, El Rahmany, and Ismail Sherine; and Israel's Water Eytan, Reuven Shiloah, Elias Sasson, and Shabtai Rosenne.

The Cuban Missile Crisis

Describes the 1962 Cuban Missile Crisis and the United Nations' U Thant; the United States' John F. Kennedy, Robert F. Kennedy, and Adlai Stevenson; and Russia's Nikita Khrushchev, Anatoly Dobrynin, and Valerian Zorin.

The Reykjavik Summit

Describes the 1986 Reykjavík Summit and the United States' Ronald Reagan and Russia's Mikhail Gorbachev.
