= Farmers' markets in New York City =

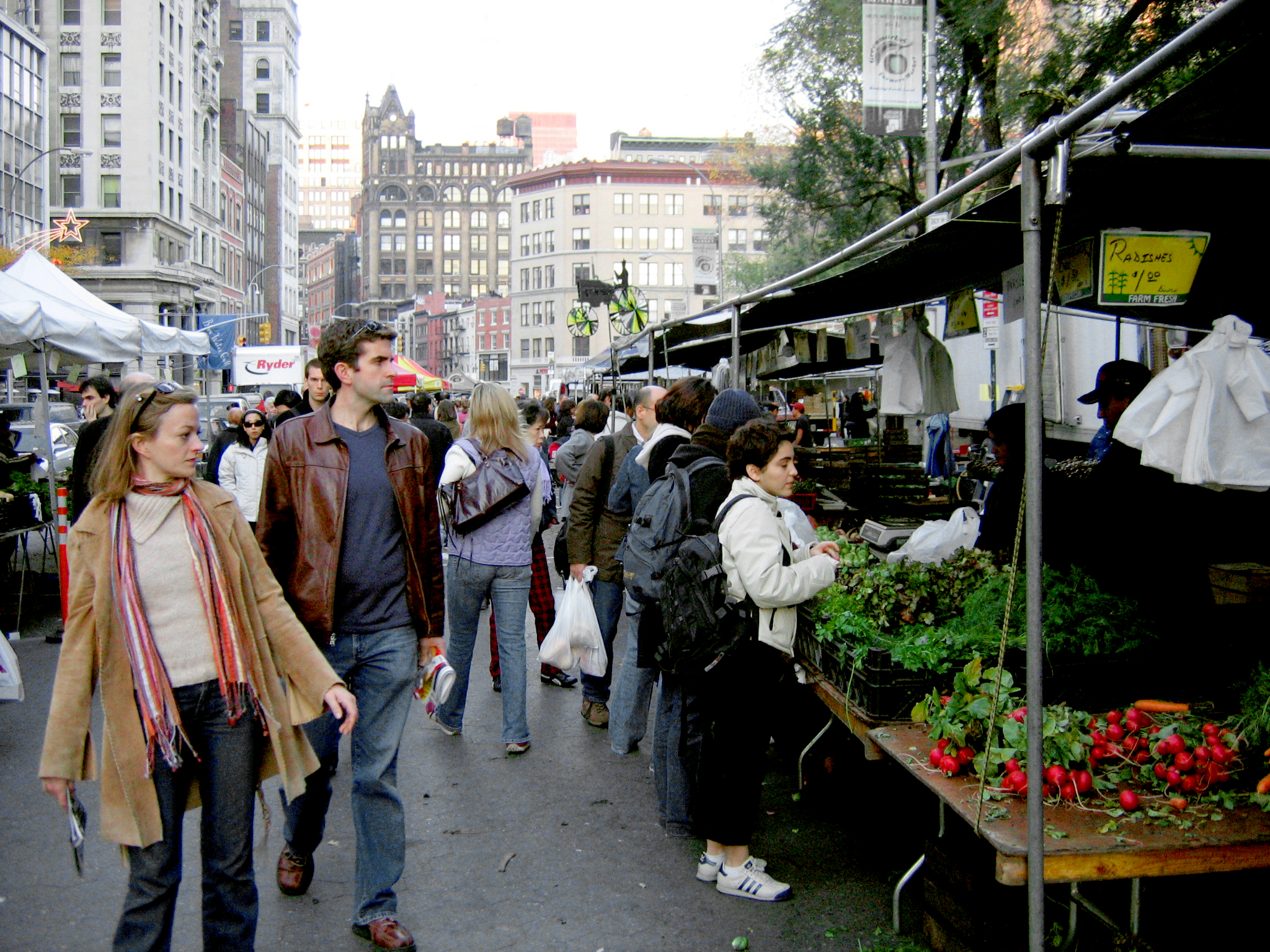
The outdoor Greenmarket Farmers Market in Union Square, Manhattan, held four days each week

There are over 50 farmer's markets in New York City in all boroughs, which operate under GrowNYC under the "Greenmarket" name. GrowNYC's food hub, "Greenmarket", includes Greenmarket Co., Youthmarket, Fresh Food Box, and the Wholesale Greenmarket under its programming. Greenmarket farmers market aims to encourage regional agriculture by allowing small family farms to sell their locally grown fruits, vegetables, flowers, dairy and other products, so that people in New York of all incomes and in all parts, have access to the fresh, nutritious, provincial, affordable and sustainable goods.

GrowNYC's network, Greenmarket Co., has customers that range from Michelin-starred restaurants, popular food retailers to family-run bodegas, senior centers and soap kitchens; and their sources are not only from small to mid sized farms in Northeast region of New York State and New York City but also from farms in New Jersey, Pennsylvania and New England, providing New Yorkers with a bountiful and diverse array of fresh foods.

One well-known farmer's market in New York is the Union Square Greenmarket which was founded in 1976, held year-round on Mondays, Wednesdays, Fridays and Saturdays with changing vendors on different days. The number of regional farmers, fishers, and bakers go as high as 140 during the most popular seasons, when the market is visited by food-enthusiast New Yorkers. Union square farmers market offers seasonal, fresh fruits and vegetables, artisanal cheeses, meats, breads, pickles, jams, wines, flowers amongst many others. The market is situated at the city's one of the most vibrant locations and allows about 60,000 people to shop, taste and tour while meeting with farmers

== History ==
The process of creating a farmers market in New York City was very difficult and came with many hurdles. There are many organizations that needed to be consulted with in order to have made this possible: community boards, zoning committees, local merchants, the office of the Mayor of New York City and more. The first farmers market in New York City was at 59th Street and Second Avenue and opened Saturday, July 17, 1976, and it is conceived by Barry Benepe, an urban planner who grew up in a small family farm in Maryland. In early 1976, Barry Benepe did a written proposal to finance New York City's first Greenmarket. Barry was an architect for the city government and Orange County, New York when he came up with the idea of a city greenmarket to solve the problem of loss of farmland in the metropolitan area because small farmers could not compete with large-scale commercial farms anymore and they had begun to sell their land to real estate developers. Due to loss of farmland the food being produced on the small regional farms was not making it into New York City causing a lack of fresh, decent food in the city. The problem is further explained in "The Cornucopia Project" that details how from 1960 to 1980 the number of farms decreased by 28 percent and the land in farms by 19.5%.

Barry became the project director of the Greenmarket for the Council on the Environment of New York City (now GrowNYC) when they got involved in implementing his idea of the first city greenmarket.

The following organizations donated to Barry's idea: America the Beautiful Fund gave $800, the J.M. Kaplan Fund gave $10,000, the Fund for the City of New York gave $5,000 the Vincent Astor Foundation gave $10,000 and other public officials including Consumer Affairs Commissioner Elinor Guggenheim. On July 17, seven farmers from "Long Island, New Jersey and upstate New York" participated in selling at the first greenmarket which quickly became successful.

New York City Department of City Planning proposed to open a second farmers market at Union Square and a third one in Brooklyn. The Union Square Market opened on August 30, 1976, and the Brooklyn Farmers Market opened on September 1. "Site ownership affected the total cost, while the Brooklyn site required a monthly rental fee, the two publicly owned sites in Manhattan were free, but required long, difficult, costly regulations". In Brooklyn the site owner was the Brooklyn Academy of Music. In order to cover these costs, farmers were charged a fee based on truck size and market location.

Other than fees, farmers were required to be certified by the County Extension Agent, posts reasonable prices, use scales, have a sign indication of farm name and location and cleaning up the selling space at the end of the day. Farmer profits ranged from $300 to $1,200 every market day. However, they would operate on Wednesdays only. The New York City greenmarkets would close from October to April.
