= New York Civic =

New York Civic's Logo

New York Civic is a New York-based, good governance, nonprofit organization created in 2002 by Henry Stern, former Commissioner of the New York City Department of Parks and Recreation, and Alan M. Moss, former first deputy parks commissioner.

According to the organization's website, "New York Civic frames and brings media attention to important issues using the Internet, press events, commentaries, public fora, and public testimonies. We also, on request, advise elected and appointed officials on legislation, budget allocation, and management practices." In addition to founding New York Civic, Stern acts as President and head writer of the organization's public policy column, containing articles that are sent to a mailing list comprising people who have requested them. Since 2002 Stern has written over 700 articles for New York Civic. The organization itself also often appears in major news publications. New York Civic frequently hosts networking events and panel discussions which promote its good governance message.
