= Matt Labash =

American author and journalist (born 1970)

- Born: United States
- Occupations: Writer, journalist

Matthew John Labash (born 1970 or 1971) is an American author and journalist who writes the Slack Tide newsletter. He was a senior writer, and later a national correspondent at The Weekly Standard, where his articles frequently appeared. Labash has contributed to Esquire, The Wall Street Journal, The New York Times, Salon, Slate, Washingtonian, The New Republic, The Drake (a fly fishing magazine), and Nerve Magazine.

Labash specializes in long-form, humorous reportage. Many of his pieces are profiles, often of crooked and disgraced politicians; others are accounts of offbeat conferences or portraits of cities purportedly on the skids, such as Detroit and New Orleans. In 2010, Simon & Schuster published a collection of his pieces entitled Fly Fishing with Darth Vader: and Other Adventures with Evangelical Wrestlers, Political Hitmen, and Jewish Cowboys.

== Early life and education ==
His father was an officer in the U.S. Air Force, and Labash lived some of his childhood years in Germany. He has described himself as a "military brat."

He attended Mount Olive Lutheran School in San Antonio from 1974 to 1979; Hahn Elementary School on Hahn Air Force Base from 1979 to 1980; and Gateway Christian High School in San Antonio from 1982 to 1986. He studied journalism at the University of New Mexico in Albuquerque, New Mexico, graduating in 1993.

== Career ==
=== Slack Tide ===
In October, 2021, Labash launched a newsletter called Slack Tide. The newsletter, which comes out once to twice a week, requires a subscription, though some posts are free to the public. Labash describes the newsletter as being "about life and politics and culture and fly fishing and God and whatever else comes, not necessarily in that order."

=== Early career ===
He has said that his first job was at "a pool snack bar at the Andrews AFB Officer's Club." Before joining The Weekly Standard in 1995, Labash worked for the Albuquerque Monthly, Washingtonian magazine, and The American Spectator.

=== Weekly Standard ===
Labash wrote for the Weekly Standard since its founding in 1995. His first article for the magazine appeared in its issue of September 18, 1995.

He wrote two general types of pieces for the Weekly Standard – pieces for the magazine's website that "are a lot riff-ier, and pop-culture-y and you can polish it off in a day or two," and pieces for the print magazine that require him to "go see the world and find an interesting nook and cranny... I like to find little undiscovered pockets or subjects or interesting people and just ride them into the ground. Things I know other people aren't going to get at." He has said that he profiles men "who are not quite in control of their own appetites, who live a little bit larger, so we don't have to."

Labash has profiled scores of people for the Standard, including his friend and colleague Christopher Hitchens, politician James Traficant (whom he called "the most colorful man who ever inhabited Congress"), CNN reporter Anderson Cooper (of whom he has stated "now all journalistic history is divided into two periods: BAC and AAC. Before Anderson Cooper and After"), filmmaker Michael Moore ("a Ritz-Carlton revolutionary...the entertainment world's Jesse Jackson, a migratory Mau-Mauist showing up at corporations to demand concessions that will ultimately benefit him, leaving companies a choice between throwing him a bone and risking public humiliation"), and celebrity lawyer William Kunstler ("Defender of Stalinists, all-around press hound, and guest star on TV's Law and Order").

He reported that the 1995 National Conference on Political Assassinations was attended by "fine, friendly folk...from lonely burgs in the Rust and Cheese Belts" who "left behind practices and jobs and bughouses and militia recruiting offices to spend a long weekend in a whirlpool of scholarship, muckraking, and paranoia with the ambience of a 30-year chess club reunion gone deeply, seriously awry." He recounted his "bourbon tour of Kentucky" and reported on the Whiteness Project, "an 'interactive documentary short' brought to us by acclaimed documentary filmmaker Whitney Dow,"

He also reported from Kuwait during the Iraq War. "I was embedded at the resort Hilton in Kuwait," he wrote. "I donned a chemical suit about nine or ten times a day. The alarm kept going off in our hotel. This was back when we thought Saddam had chemical weapons and was willing to use them." Also, he wrote about the death of his friend and colleague Andrew Breitbart, whom he memorialized as "a partisan warrior and a guerrilla theater aficionado – half right wing Yippie, half Andy Kaufman.... Breitbart had the brains, the talent, and the animal charisma to get people to set cars on fire for him, or to run off with him to the desert where he might start his own anti-Obama doomsday cult. But while he believed in what he espoused, perhaps a little too much, he was also in it for other reasons – for action, and for amusement. He didn't just hit scandal head-on. He enjoyed coming at it slyly. He gloried in the art of presentation."

Labash deliberately does not use Facebook or Twitter, and has written lengthy essays attacking both of these popular social media sites. In his May 2013 article about Twitter, he stated, "I outright despise the inescapable microblogging service, which nudges its users to leave no thought unexpressed, except for the fully formed ones....I hate the way Twitter transforms the written word into abbreviations and hieroglyphics, the staccato bursts of emptiness that occur when Twidiots who have no business writing for public consumption squeeze themselves into 140-character cement shoes. People used to write more intelligently than they speak. Now, a scary majority tend to speak more intelligently than they tweet.....I hate that formerly respectable adults now think it's okay to go at each other like spray-tanned girls on Jersey Shore, who start windmill-slapping each other after they've each had double-digit cherry vodkas and one calls the other "fat."

Labash has occasionally departed from the Weekly Standard's perceived political positions. He once stated, "I was sour on the war (in Iraq) when many, many of our neoliberal friends were still something close to cheerleaders....I just never understood what was in it for America to get bogged down there for the better part of a decade. Still don't. I thought it was a bad play." Bush, he said in 2004, "has spent the better part of a year and a half painting smiley faces on Iraq, when it is still a festering sore, to put it charitably."

Labash mocked Sarah Palin in a 2010 piece about her reality TV show, noting that despite her assertion that she loves Alaska "like I love my family," except that Palin "didn't give her family up after governing it for two-and-a-half years, so that she could get a Fox News contract, and make 100 grand per speech, and write two books in a year, and drag her entire family onto a tacky reality show." He added: "one could see how Karl Rove... has a point when suggesting that the American people might expect 'a certain level of gravitas' in someone who's considering running for president, and that starring in your own reality show might not be the ticket."

By way of explaining the Standard's tolerance for his ideological deviation, he said in an interview with Esquire: "it's called diversity of opinion. There is such a thing at the same magazine, believe it or not." Apropos of Weekly Standard editor William Kristol, Labash added: "My opinions often aren't his, and his often aren't mine. That's why my byline runs over my work, and his byline runs over his." He expanded on these observations in another interview: "I work in the right-wing world, but we have a good understanding at the magazine that everyone gets to follow their interests and eccentricities. Our editors... give us a lot of writerly freedom. I'm less interested in scoring ideological points than in finding good stories. Good stories shouldn't have to conform to some predetermined formula."

=== Other journalism ===
Labash has written for the Wall Street Journal, Salon, and Slate.

He contributed to the 2014 anthology The Seven Deadly Virtues: 18 Conservative Writers on Why the Virtuous Life is Funny as Hell, edited by Jonathan V. Last, which was described by the publisher as "a hilarious, insightful, sanctimony-free remix of William Bennett's The Book of Virtues—without parental controls." Other contributors include Christopher Buckley, Christopher Caldwell, Andrew Ferguson, Rob Long, P. J. O'Rourke, and Joe Queenan.

Labash writes occasionally for Nerve.com and Nerve magazine, which, he said, "prides itself as a literary smut magazine. They're good people. I like them and they like me and we both like sex. I'm sort of the house prude and the pet reactionary. It strikes me when I'm doing it. They actually hire a guy like me to react against sex because it's impossible to shock people with sex these days."

=== Fly Fishing with Darth Vader ===
In 2010, a collection of Labash essays from the Standard, Fly Fishing with Darth Vader: and Other Adventures with Evangelical Wrestlers, Political Hitmen, and Jewish Cowboys, was published by Simon & Schuster. The articles ranged from profiles of politicians, ranging from then-Vice Pres. Richard B. Cheney to former Ohio Rep. James Traficant, and American cities such as Detroit, Michigan and New Orleans, Louisiana, to personal opinion-related pieces on such issues as US-Canada relations, physical education, and Facebook.

The book received wide acclaim. "Labash takes readers to the fringes in his portraits of people and places outside the mainstream and, very often, beyond our ken," wrote Publishers Weekly. "His subjects are outlandish and unforgettable....His profiles of disgraced former Washington, D.C., mayor Marion Barry, corrupt former Louisiana governor Edwin Edwards, Rev. Al Sharpton, and Vice President Dick Cheney stand out for their affecting portrayals of the humanity behind the larger-than-life personas." The review in Booklist stated: "Whatever their politics, readers will appreciate Labash's energetic style and biting insights."

Describing Labash as "one of the most consistently entertaining magazine writers today," Jeffrey Goldberg of The Atlantic praised his "innate sympathy for scoundrels," saying that "he brings them to life like no other journalist today." Goldberg called Fly Fishing with Darth Vader "the funniest book of the year." David Carr of the New York Times called Labash "the king of hang time, insinuating himself into a subject's world — remember immersion journalism? — and then writing those encounters up in all their rococo glory." Describing Labash as "one of the absolute greatest magazine writers in America" and calling Fly Fishing with Darth Vader "exceptionally good," The reviewer for Esquire wrote that "Every now and then, a collection of remarkable stories from a magazine writer has the effect of unleashing a significant new voice on an unsuspecting public. Tom Wolfe's Kandy-Kolored Tangerine-Flake Streamline Baby comes to mind. And so it is with Matt Labash's wonderful Fly Fishing with Darth Vader."

Emily Bazelon of Slate described the book as "a collection of inflated egos, delicately punctured. You can hear the hiss as the air goes out of Dick Cheney, Arnold Schwarzenegger, Al Sharpton, Marion Barry, and Roger Stone. At the same time, you'll also come away with some sympathy for these men, or at least their foibles."

"In a just world," wrote Mark Lasswell in a review of the book for The Wall Street Journal, "Matt Labash would be celebrated as the heir to Tom Wolfe, Hunter Thompson and other writers in the 1960s and 1970s who were corralled under the rubric of 'new journalism'.....Like the best of the new-journalism practitioners, Mr. Labash inhabits a story so thoroughly that readers feel as if they're at his side, seeing events with his sharp eye, privy to his wisecracks, savoring moments when he reels in what feels like the truth." Lasswell noted that "Labash specializes in going after catfish of the human variety: the unpopular, the no-hopers, the has-beens and the rogues." While Labash "doesn't pull his punches" in such pieces as his profile of former Washington mayor Marion Barry, "he succeeds in producing an affecting portrait of a rapscallion in twilight.... the deep satisfaction of finishing a story and feeling that it couldn't have been told better."

The magazine First Things, in its review of Fly Fishing with Darth Vader, stated that comparisons to Hunter S. Thompson and P.J. O'Rourke don't "do justice to the deeply sympathetic twist" in Labash's voice. "The Weekly Standard senior writer intercuts biting analysis of America's declining fortunes with juicy, hilarious portraits of its damaged politicians, and somehow manages to humanize even the most inhuman among us....Unlike his first-person-possessed New Journalism forebears, Labash subordinates his own tough-guy persona in favor of the absurdities in his notes. At heart, he's a highly skilled reporter who prefers a powerful quotation to a self-absorbed reference – realizing, correctly, that a writer can convey a point of view without turning the spotlight on the process but, rather, on its rewards. By targeting his sensibilities on the fringe figures of American politics, Labash performs a valuable public service even as he establishes himself as one of the top writers of his generation."

== Deepak Chopra lawsuit ==
Labash was sued by New Age author Deepak Chopra, after Labash wrote an article in the July 1, 1996 issue of the Standard exposing alleged inconsistencies between the healthy, moral lifestyle advocated by Chopra and his real-life conduct. Included in the exposé were accounts from call girls, substantiated by credit card receipts, purportedly indicating that Chopra had paid for their services. The article also delved into allegations that a Chopra book plagiarized the writing of others and that Chopra sold mail-order herbal remedies containing high amounts of rodent hairs. According to an article in The Columbia Journalism Review (CJR), the Standard went to "unusual lengths" to document the accusations against Chopra, but it nonetheless eventually settled with Chopra for an undisclosed sum and issued a complete retraction.

Some court records brought out the fact that Labash had tape recorded some interviewees without telling them, sometimes from his home in Maryland, where surreptitious taping is a felony. In a court brief, one of Chopra's lawyers, William Bradford Reynolds, a Reagan administration Justice Department official, described Labash as a "brash young 25-year-old cub reporter." Libel experts said the information revealed in court records indicated that it would be difficult to prove the Standard had acted with "actual malice" but that juries were unpredictable. The Standard was at the time owned by billionaire Rupert Murdoch through News Corp.

== Political views ==
In late 2007, Labash described his politics and astrology sign: "Politically, I'm not terribly complicated. I regard myself as a fiscal and social conservative with strong libertarian overtones. Turn-ons include low taxes, balanced budgets, and a robust military. Turn-offs include waging unwinnable wars, government intervention, and mean people."

He has stated "At the polls, I vote my conscience—no easy feat, as I haven't had one since around 1997."

== Views on journalism ==
Labash has summed up his philosophy of reporting as follows: "The best details always come when you think you already know everything." "I subscribe to Thoreau's philosophy: 'Simplify, simplify.' Or as we true minimalists say: 'Simplify.'"

He has facetiously stated: "I don't talk to Real People often if I can help it, as they tend to confuse the emerging media narrative with their common sense, consistency, and almost touching naïveté."

"Being the prescriptive village pronouncer isn't my bag," he told Esquire. "In fact, I design my entire life so that I don't do that kind of writing. Everybody wants to pronounce, not everybody wants to weave tales, which takes a lot more work, on average. So I'd much prefer to go hang out with Kinky Friedman and write a character study, as my book bears out."

"Journalism," Labash has said, "is definitely like psychotherapy. When you successfully get into a subject's head, you're their priest, their best friend, their spouse, their bartender, their shrink. They end up telling you, a stranger, things they often don't tell the people they know best. And you know why? Because you asked."

"I get surprised by something almost every story," he has said. "In fact, I live for those surprises. That's the best part."

"If I were teaching a journalism class, I'd tell students to be a human being first, and a journalist second," he has said. "Because even if you're a cold bastard, you get better stuff. Respond to people as you would respond to them naturally, not just as a "journalist" would respond. That's important, since most people think journalists are assholes, which is not without some justification. Most subjects though, at least the ones I often write about, tend to be kind of lonely. Even and especially the famous and quasi-famous. So when you become their friend – in the artificial way journalists and subjects become friends – you're halfway there. And sometimes you even stay friends after. Most people just want to be understood. And all people like talking about themselves."

On New York Times fabulist Jayson Blair: "It's a pretty ballsy thing to be filing stories from places you've never been. I felt like I was there when Jayson Blair was writing. Unfortunately he wasn't."

On his writing process: "I don't do drafts. I edit as I go along. So I'm always throwing stuff out. And then when I finish, I read and read and re-read. I do so at the computer about 10 or 15 times, all the way through, hammering things out here and there. Then when I have it pretty close, I print it out, and I read and read and read some more, while I pace. Because walking helps, for some reason. We live in our own heads too much. It's good to make writing as physical as possible. Sometimes I read out loud, not because I need to sound out big thesaurus words, but because it's easier to tell if you're missing a beat or have an extra beat too many. Writing and music – same difference. It's all about rhythm. And I look like an idiot doing this, quite frankly."

On not being a TV talking head he has said "I have friends who go on TV a lot and say, 'You ought to be on TV.' I don't do it partly because of performance anxiety. I'm pretty sure I'm going to screw it up. Second, it just makes me feel like a fraud. Popping off about issues of the day that I'm considered an expert on simply because I read the paper that morning doesn't feel right to me, which is surprising because I pop off a lot in real life. You take me out to lunch and put a few beers in me and I'll pop off all you want. Going on TV sort of formalizes it. It makes me feel like a dork and that's my rule of thumb public behavior-wise: try not to be a dork."

== Honors and awards ==
"Matt Labash of The Weekly Standard is consistently one of the best magazine writers in the country," David Brooks, editorial columnist for The New York Times wrote in his December 25, 2007 column. Brooks named Labash as one of the winners of the "Sidney Awards" — the columnist's annual naming of the articles he considers the best of the year. Brooks gave Labash another "Sidney Award" two years later for his essay on Marion Barry, "A Rake's Progress."

== Personal life ==
Labash is married to Alana Peruzzi Labash. They live in Owings, Maryland, and have two sons, Luke and Dean. Luke is an avid fly fisher.

His favorite writers include Richard Ford, P.G. Wodehouse, Peter De Vries, Tom Wolfe, Thomas Lynch, and Tom McGuane.
