= Henry Stern (New York politician) =

American lawyer and politician (1935–2019)

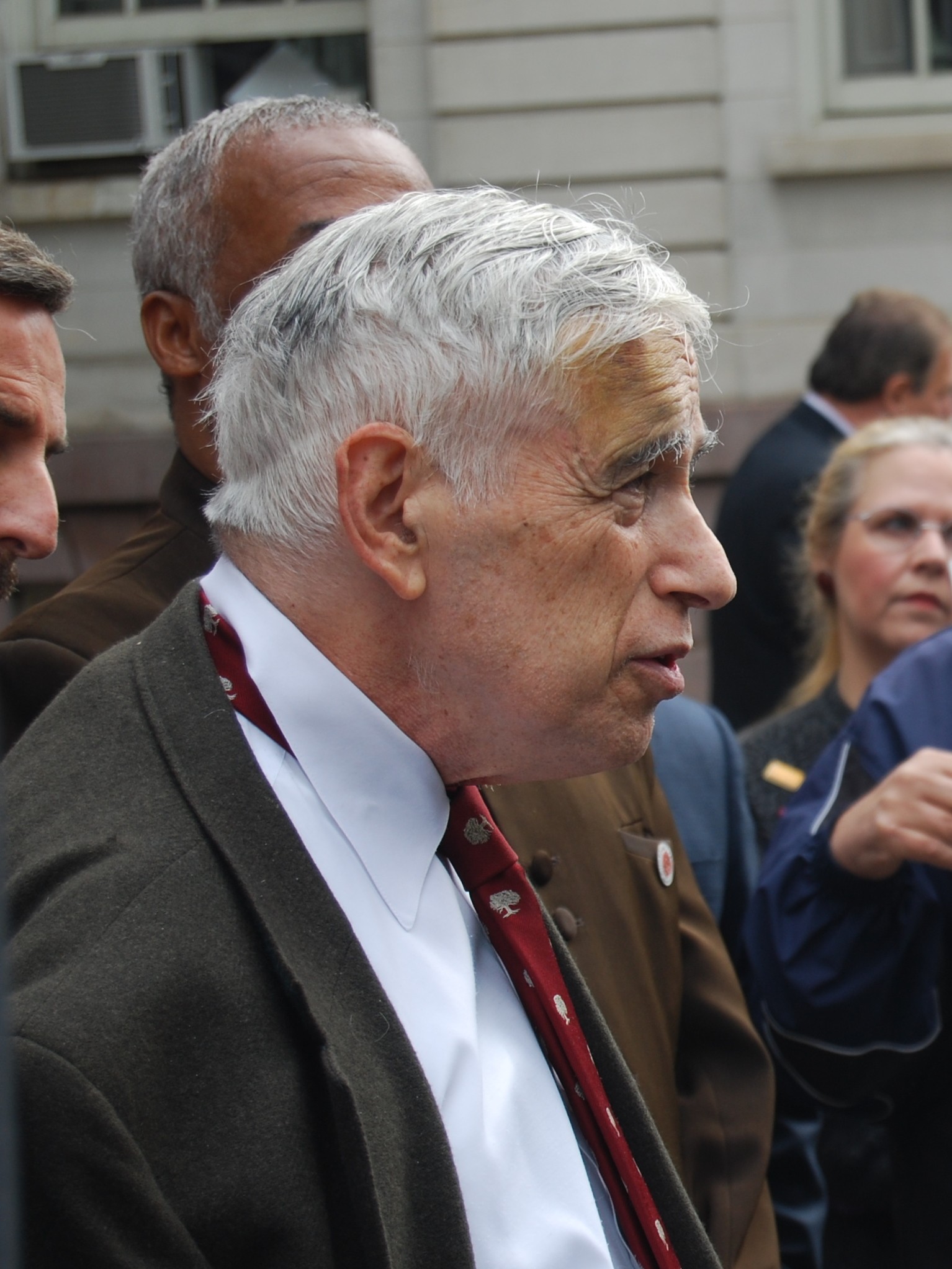
- Stern in 2008

Parks Commissioner of New York City
- In office January 1, 1994 – February 3, 2002
- Appointed by: Rudy Giuliani
- Preceded by: Elisabeth F. Gotbaum
- Succeeded by: Adrian Benepe
- In office April 2, 1983 – February 4, 1990
- Appointed by: Ed Koch
- Preceded by: Gordon J. Davis
- Succeeded by: Elisabeth F. Gotbaum

Personal details
- Born: May 1, 1935 Manhattan, New York City, U.S.
- Died: March 28, 2019 (aged 83) Manhattan, New York City, U.S.
- Party: Liberal Party of New York
- Spouse: Margaret Lora Ewing (m. 1976)
- Children: 2
- Education: Bronx High School of Science
- Alma mater: City College of New York; Harvard Law School
- Occupation: Founder of New York Civic

Henry Jordan Stern (May 1, 1935 – March 28, 2019) was a member of the New York City Council from 1974 to 1983 and appointed as the Commissioner of the New York City Department of Parks and Recreation from 1983 to 1990 and again from 1994 to 2000.

== Early life ==
Stern grew up in the Inwood neighborhood of Upper Manhattan, the son of Jean (Friedlander), a bookkeeper, and Walter Stern, a tent manufacturer. He attended Bronx High School of Science, graduating at 15. He attended City College and was the youngest member of the class of 1957 at Harvard Law School, at the age of twenty-two.

== Political career ==
Stern began in public service in 1957 as law clerk to Matthew M. Levy, a New York State Supreme Court Justice. He was appointed secretary of the Borough of Manhattan in 1962, and was an assistant to Borough Presidents Edward R. Dudley, a former ambassador, and prominent African American civil rights activist, and Constance Baker Motley, the first African-American woman to become a federal court judge. In 1966, Parks Commissioner Thomas Hoving appointed him executive director of the agency. He later became assistant city administrator in the office of Deputy Mayor Timothy W. Costello. In 1969, the NYC Departments of Licensing, and of Markets, Weights and Measures were consolidated into the New York City Department of Consumer Affairs; its commissioner, Bess Myerson, appointed Stern associate commissioner and the next year he became her first deputy. Commissioner Myerson resigned on March 9, 1973 and suggested Stern succeed her, however, he continued to serve under the new commissioner Betty Furness until the end of her tenure in 1973.

=== City Council ===
In November 1973 Stern was elected to the city council as a councilman-at-large for Manhattan on the Liberal Party of New York line, defeating the Republican candidate by about 1000 votes to win second place (two were elected per borough). His at-large colleague on the council was Robert F. Wagner, Jr. and the two worked together on many matters, including the sale of neckties emblazoned with the Seal of the City of New York to raise funds for libraries and other public purposes.

Stern was re-elected in 1977, winning by 16,000 votes. In 1981, he received the Republican as well as the Liberal nomination, but the position was abolished by the Federal courts and no election was held.

=== Parks Commissioner ===
In February 1983, Mayor Edward I. Koch appointed Stern Commissioner of Parks and Recreation; he served for Koch's second and third term.

The election of Mayor Rudolph W. Giuliani in 1993 brought him back into city government; he was appointed Parks Commissioner, starting January 1, 1994. He was one of the few Giuliani commissioners to serve the entire eight years of his mayoralty, plus a month with Mayor Bloomberg.

An eccentric (but popular) aspect of his later tenure as Parks Commissioner was his insistence that Parks employees and friends of parks have nicknames (called "park names" or "noms du parc") used for communication, especially over walkie-talkies. Stern's personal nickname was "StarQuest".

During his tenure, Stern mandated at least one animal-themed sculpture at every playground the city built or renovated. According to his employee, and later successor, Adrian Benepe, Stern had an obsession with animal-themed architecture, and oversaw the installation of hundreds of animal structures in playgrounds. Another signature policy was the erection of large flagstaffs with naval-style yards bearing both American and Parks Department flags in many parks. In 2021, the parks department announced it was opening a Home for Retired Playground Animals in Flushing Meadows–Corona Park, which will be home to the animals which are no longer maintained in their playgrounds.

== Discrimination lawsuits ==
During Stern's tenure as Parks Commissioner, numerous allegations of racism and similar bias were made against him. Lawsuits followed, leading to settlements costing NYC taxpayers millions of dollars. As reported in The Chief-Leader of March 7, 2008 "...the city agreed to pay $21 million to the plaintiffs and their attorneys to settle a lawsuit accusing the Parks Department of racial bias." In the settlement, the Parks Department admitted to no wrongdoing.

== Civic life ==
=== Citizens Union ===
While Stern was out of Parks during the David Dinkins NYC mayoral administration, he served as president of Citizens Union, a good government group founded in 1897. His former colleague on the city council, Robert F. Wagner Jr. was chairman of the board.

=== New York Civic ===
On February 4, 2002, Stern returned to the civic world as founder and president of New York Civic, a Manhattan-based good government group. Over nine years, he penned over 750 articles on public policy for the organization. He sent them to a list of people who ask for them, which at one point included 14,000 subscribers. They are also available on New York Civic's website and were regularly republished by The Huffington Post, Queens Tribune, and several other publications.

== Personal life ==
On September 12, 1976, Stern married Margaret Lora Ewing, a pediatrician whom he met at a meeting of the Park Lincoln Free Democrats club on the Upper West Side of Manhattan. They had two sons: Jared Ewing, born in December 1977, and Kenan Walter Davis, born in June 1980.

Stern died on March 28, 2019, at the age of 83 from complications of advanced Parkinson's disease.

Political offices
Preceded by Gordon Davis	Commissioner of the New York City Department of Parks and Recreation; 1983—1990	Succeeded by Betsy Gotbaum
Preceded by Betsy Gotbaum	Commissioner of the New York City Department of Parks and Recreation; 1994—2002	Succeeded by Adrian Benepe
