= Roger Stone =

American political consultant and lobbyist (born 1952)

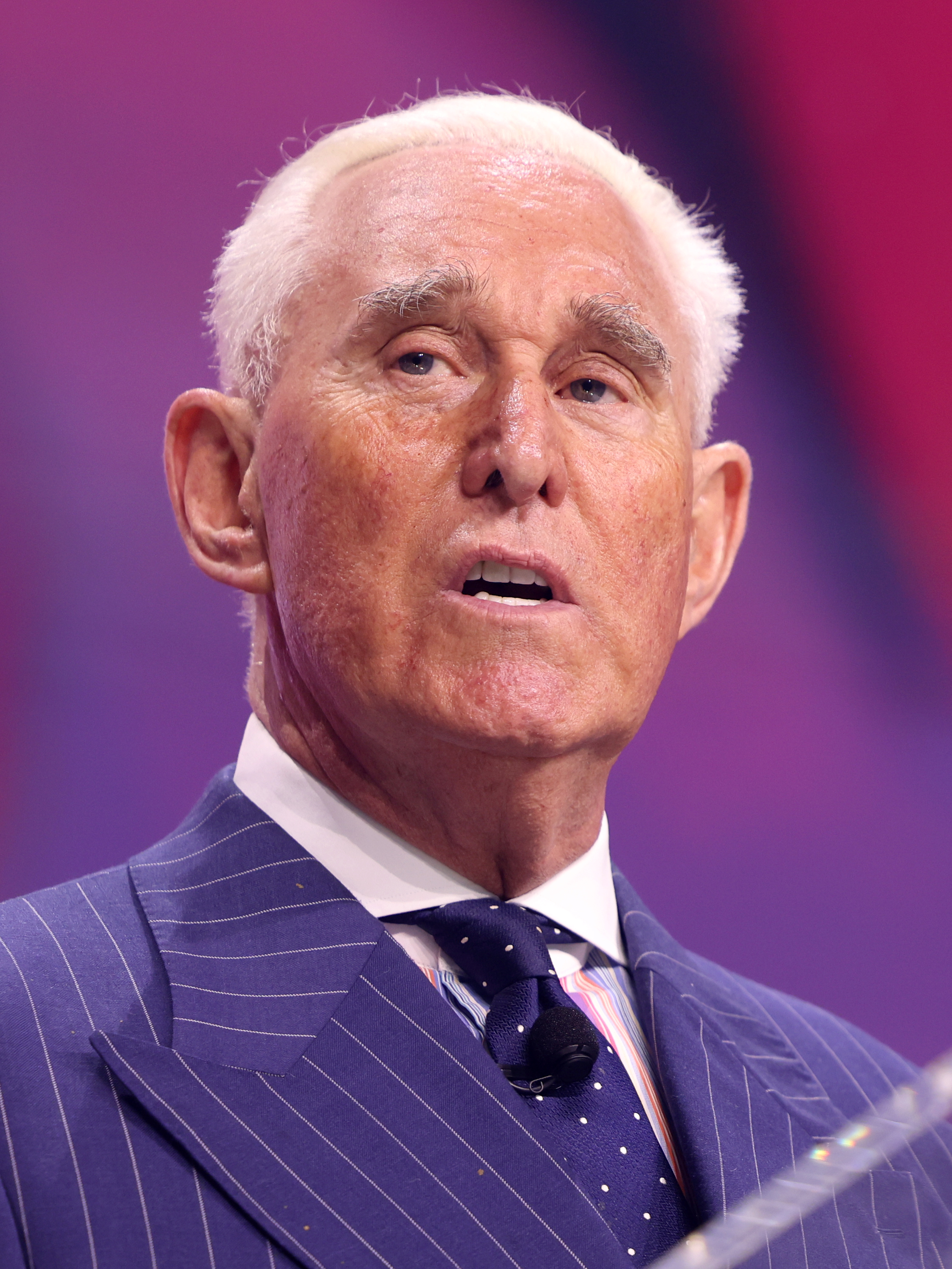
- Stone in 2025
- Born: Roger Joseph Stone Jr. August 27, 1952 (age 74); Norwalk, Connecticut, U.S.
- Education: George Washington University (did not graduate)
- Occupations: Activist; consultant; lobbyist
- Political party: Republican (before 2012, since 2015); Libertarian (2012–2015)
- Movement: New Right; New Apostolic Reformation
- Spouses: Anne Wesche (m. 1974; div. 1990) Nydia Bertran (m. 1992)
- Criminal information
- Status: Pardoned; following commutation
- Criminal charges: Felony counts of: Witness tampering; Obstructing an official proceeding; Making false statements to Congress
- Penalty: 40 months in federal prison (Note: Stone served no time as President Donald Trump commuted his sentence, then pardoned him.)

Roger Jason Stone Jr. (born Roger Joseph Stone Jr.; August 27, 1952) (Note: According to birth and college records obtained by The Washington Post in 1986, Stone changed his middle name from "Joseph" to "Jason". When asked about the change, Stone said that, "It's Jason as far as I know".) is an American conservative activist, political consultant, and lobbyist. Since the 1970s, he has worked on the campaigns of Republican politicians, including Richard Nixon, Ronald Reagan, Jack Kemp, Bob Dole, George W. Bush, and—most prominently—Donald Trump. Stone co-founded the lobbying firm Black, Manafort, Stone and Kelly in 1980 with Charles R. Black Jr. and Paul Manafort, later recruiting Peter G. Kelly in 1984.

Drawn to conservatism after reading Barry Goldwater's book The Conscience of a Conservative (1960), Stone supported Goldwater's 1964 presidential campaign as a child. He attended George Washington University but dropped out; while there, he was hired to spy on rival presidential campaigns during the Democratic Party presidential primaries for Nixon's 1972 campaign as part of a clandestine operation that became part of the Watergate scandal. Stone worked in Reagan's unsuccessful bid for president in 1976 and became the president of the Young Republicans in 1977. Known as the "keeper of the Nixon flame", he advised Nixon following his presidency. Stone continued to work for Reagan in his 1980 presidential campaign under the behest of John Sears and was "instrumental" to his 1984 campaign. Black, Manafort and Stone became one of the most prominent lobbying firms by 1990, although it gained notoriety for its clientele such as dictators.

In the early 1980s, Stone began working with Donald Trump through Black, Manafort and Stone, who was the firm's first client. He began working with Trump more directly in the 1990s as a lobbyist for the nascent Trump Hotels & Casino Resorts. In 1999, Stone became the campaign manager for Trump's 2000 presidential campaign. He served as an advisor for Trump's 2016 campaign until August 2015. Business partner Paul Manafort served as Trump's campaign manager. During his time working for Trump, Stone repeatedly communicated with WikiLeaks and its founder, Julian Assange. Despite his departure, Stone's support for Trump intensified in the years since and, in April 2016, he founded the pro-Trump activist group Stop the Steal. During the 2020 United States presidential election, he supported Trump once again; following Trump's loss to Joe Biden, Stone spread multiple unproven allegations of voter fraud. He was subpoenaed by the House Select Committee on the January 6 Attack in November 2021. Stone has reaffirmed his support for Trump in his 2024 campaign.

Stone's communications with Russian officials and WikiLeaks received scrutiny. During the 2016 presidential election, John Podesta, the chairman for Hillary Clinton's 2016 presidential campaign, accused him of having knowledge of Podesta's emails before they were released. Conservative publication The Washington Times reported that Stone had contact with Guccifer 2.0, the persona of a Russian hacker or hacker group that gained access into the servers of the Democratic National Committee. On January 25, 2019, Stone's Fort Lauderdale, Florida home was raided by the Federal Bureau of Investigation and he was arrested in connection to Robert Mueller's special counsel investigation. He was charged with one count of witness tampering, one count of obstructing an official proceeding, and five counts of making false statements to Congress and indicted in November 2019; Stone was sentenced to 40 months in prison. His term was commuted by Trump in July 2020 and he was pardoned on December 23, 2020.

== Early life and education ==
Roger Joseph Stone Jr. was born on August 27, 1952 in Norwalk, Connecticut, the oldest of three children. His parents, of Italian and Hungarian descent, were Gloria Rose (Corbo) Stone and Roger J. Stone. As a child, the Stones moved to Lewisboro, New York. His mother wrote for the local newspaper and was a Cub Scout den mother, while his father ran a well drilling company and was a member of the Vista Fire Department. According to Stone, his family was middle class, blue collar, and Catholic. He took an active interest in politics early on; in an interview with The Washington Post, he recounted telling classmates that Richard Nixon was in favor of school on Saturdays to further John F. Kennedy's presidential campaign during the 1960 United States presidential election, calling it his "first political trick". Stone believed that, although his parents were Republicans, they held a special admiration for Kennedy because he was a Catholic.

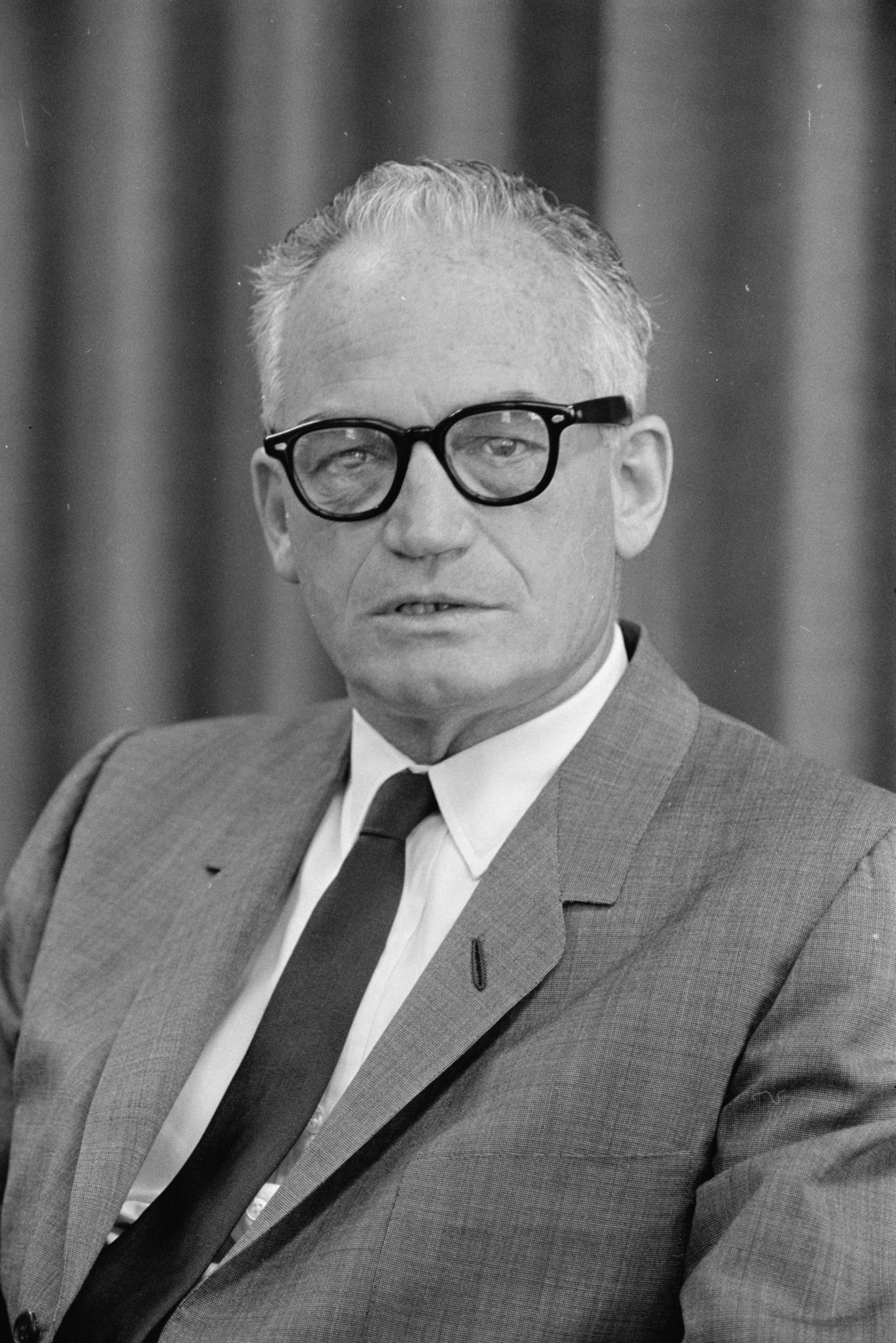
Stone admired Barry Goldwater after receiving a copy of his book The Conscience of a Conservative (1960).

Stone became particularly involved in politics when a neighbor gave him a copy of Barry Goldwater's book The Conscience of a Conservative (1960), convincing him to become a conservative. He took to wearing a Goldwater button to school and ran errands for the local Republican headquarters after school despite being seen as an outcast by his peers. Stone's bedroom was decorated "like the Goldwater headquarters", adorned with posters of Goldwater and vice presidential nominee William E. Miller. When Goldwater lost the 1964 presidential election to Lyndon B. Johnson, he was "crushed", didn't eat for days, and cried. A year later, Stone began commuting to New York to support the mayoral campaign of William F. Buckley, Jr., founder of the National Review. Buckley's son, Christopher Buckley, reportedly threw him into a hotel swimming pool while attending the 1968 Republican National Convention, a claim Buckley denies. Stone was first introduced to former president Richard Nixon through his mentor, Connecticut governor and ambassador John Davis Lodge. He met Nixon in 1967; Lodge appointed him as the chairman of Youth for Nixon a year later.

Stone attended John Jay High School in Westchester County, where he ran for president of his freshmen class. He became vice president of the student body his junior year and president his senior year. According to his mother, Stone's extravagant campaigns earned him an honorary athletic letter, the only one in the school's history. Social studies teacher John Wirchansky said people bunted for him and walked down the aisles "in hats". In an interview with The New York Times, he said, "I built alliances and put all my serious challengers on my ticket. Then I recruited the most unpopular guy in the school to run against me. You think that's mean? No, it's smart." In 1970, Stone enrolled in George Washington University and moved to Washington, D.C.. He became president of the District of Columbia charter of the Young Republicans and regularly attended Young Americans for Freedom meetings while his roommates, according to Stone, "[protested] the Vietnam War". Stone claimed to have attended George Washington University for five years and majored in political science, but the university's registrar shows that he only completed two years and signed up for continuous enrollment, but only completed one more course the following year. He later stated that the courses were "not relevant to real life".

== Political career ==
=== 1971–1979: Nixon's 1972 campaign and the New Right ===
In 1971, Stone was dispatched by Nixon campaign aide Herbert Porter to deliver a pamphlet prepared by aides Porter, Pat Buchanan, and Ken Khachigian criticizing Democratic presidential hopeful Edmund Muskie to Democrat George McGovern's headquarters and the Manchester Union-Leader. On another occasion, he made a contribution posing as the Young Socialist Alliance and delivered the receipt to New Hampshire news outlets. In 1972, the Committee for the Re-Election of the President sought a full-time "prankster". Stone convinced deputy director Jeb Stuart Magruder to give him a job as a scheduler. Porter enlisted Stone to identify an operative who could penetrate the campaigns of Democratic candidates. His choice was a Kentucky campaign worker named Michael McMinoway who worked under the alias Jason Rainer. McMinoway worked on the campaigns of three Democratic candidates, including McGovern and Muskie. Nixon would go on to win the 1972 presidential election and Stone worked in the Office of Economic Opportunity. Amid the Watergate scandal, he worked on the Virginia gubernatorial campaign for Mills Godwin and became a junior staffer for senator Bob Dole in December 1973. Despite being cleared by the Senate Watergate Committee and the Federal Bureau of Investigation, the scandal cost Stone his position with Dole and he was viewed as a pariah. Stone's departure came after columnist Jack Anderson called him a "dirty trickster", although he contends that he was given notice before the column appeared.

Following Nixon's presidency, Stone was described as the "keeper of the Nixon flame" by The New York Times. He became Nixon's liaison for communications to president Ronald Reagan and organized dinners with journalists at Nixon's Park Ridge, New Jersey home. Stone became involved in the second New Right in the wake of the Goldwater campaign. In 1975, he co-founded the National Conservative Political Action Committee with John Terry Dolan and Charles Black, a New Right political action committee. Stone worked in Ronald Reagan's 1976 presidential campaign. In 1977, he secured the presidency of the Young Republicans through the support of his friend from the College Republicans, Paul Manafort. Manafort had a dossier on the group's eight hundred delegates and managed Stone's campaign. The two would turn against Neal Acker, an Alabama lawyer who sought the presidency and would succeed Stone after he balked at supporting Reagan. Manafort turned the vote against Acker in a political scheme one of his whips called "one of the great fuck jobs".

=== 1980–1989: Reagan's 1980 campaign and Black, Manafort, Stone and Kelly ===
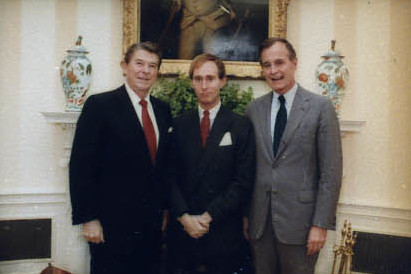
Stone with president Ronald Reagan (left) and vice president George H. W. Bush (right), pictured in 1982

Stone, a supporter of Reagan, was drawn to his 1980 presidential campaign through strategist John Sears. He coordinated his campaign in New York, New Jersey, and Connecticut. Lawyer Roy Cohn first met Stone at a New York dinner party in 1979. Stone, in need of office space, sought out noted real estate developer Donald Trump on Cohn's suggestion. Stone met Trump for the first time in 1979. Trump's father, Fred Trump, gave Reagan for President US$200,000. The Trumps found the Reagan campaign a town house next to the 21 Club. According to Stone, Cohn helped him arrange for independent John B. Anderson to secure the nomination for the Liberal Party of New York, a move that would split opposition for Reagan. He said Cohn gave him a suitcase that he avoided opening and that, as instructed by Cohn, he dropped off at the office of a lawyer influential in Liberal Party circles. Reagan would carry the state in 1980. In an interview with The Weekly Standard correspondent Matt Labash, Stone said that he paid Cohn's law firm but reserved that he "didn't know what he did for the money". According to Trump, Stone urged him to run in the 1988 presidential election, but he refused.

In 1980, Stone founded Black, Manafort and Stone with Charles R. Black Jr. and Paul Manafort, the latter of whom had controlled the Reagan campaign in the South. The firm was founded out of upheaval that left Black unemployed; following the New Hampshire primaries, Reagan fired his top staff, including Black. Trump was the firm's first client. Black, Manafort and Stone is considered to be the first "double-breasted operation" in that the firm employed two ventures: one venture ran campaigns, while the other lobbied for politicians. Lee Atwater, known for using the Southern strategy and a pioneer of race-baiting tactics, was hired to the consulting side. Black, Manafort and Stone hired former Democratic National Committee finance chairman Peter G. Kelly as a partner. Partners, including Stone, told The Washington Post that they had intended to take home US$450,000 (equivalent to $1,321,700 in 2025). It became known as "the torturer's lobby" for representing dictators of countries with poor human rights records, including Ferdinand Marcos of the Philippines and Mobutu Sese Seko of Zaire. Despite this, Black, Manafort, Stone and Kelly became one of the largest lobbying firms in Washington, D.C. As partner, Stone worked on Thomas Kean's 1981 and 1985 campaigns. During the 1988 Republican Party presidential primaries, Stone advised Jack Kemp, while Black advised Bob Dole and Atwater advised George H. W. Bush, leading one congressional staffer to joke to Time, "Why have primaries for the nomination? Why not have the candidates go over to Black, Manafort and Stone and argue it out?"

=== 1990–1997: Leaving Black, Manafort, Stone and Kelly and Dole's 1996 campaign ===
In 1990, Stone became involved in a public feud with Roger Ailes, Bush's media director for his 1988 presidential campaign and president of Ailes Communications. Connecticut Republican chairman Richard Foley attacked Ailes for negotiating to handle the gubernatorial campaign of Lowell Weicker. In turn, Ailes accused Stone of attempting to "mess [him] up" and retaliated by stating that one of his partners worked for Anthony J. Celebrezze, a Democrat running for governor of Ohio. According to The New York Times, the incident embarrassed both Ailes Communications and Black, Manafort, Stone and Kelly. On January 1, 1991, Burson-Marsteller, itself a subsidiary of the communications group Young and Rubicam, acquired Black, Manafort, Stone and Kelly. Acting on the behalf of the company, Black said that the firm would no longer engage in political activities. In the years after his feud with Ailes, Stone attracted controversy. In 1992, Time alleged Stone approved a series of advertisements attacking Michael Dukakis including Willie Horton to further George H. W. Bush's 1988 presidential campaign. Stone denied having been involved in the advertisements and said he urged Atwater into not including Horton. In 1996, The National Enquirer reported that Stone and his wife, Nydia, had put advertisements in magazines and websites seeking for partners to engage in swinging with. He denied the report on Good Morning America, but the scandal cost him his consultant job with Bob Dole for his 1996 presidential campaign; Stone was the president of Senator Arlen Specter's presidential campaign instead. In a later interview with Jeffrey Toobin, he admitted to having placed the advertisements. That year, Black, Manafort, Stone and Kelly merged with Gold and Liebengood—a lobbying firm comprising Martin B. Gold and Howard Scholer Liebengood—creating BKSH & Associates. Stone left the resulting firm.

=== 1998–2009: Trump's 2000 campaign, Brooks Brothers riot, and Eliot Spitzer ===
According to The American Spectator contributor Dave Shiflett, Donald Trump considered a run for president as far back as late 1998. Trump asked Stone, then his top aide and a lobbyist for his casino business, to find the "most eminent hack writer in America" to put his political beliefs into a book; the book would become The America We Deserve (2000). Before running Trump's 2000 campaign, Stone was briefly involved in Pat Buchanan's campaign; investigative journalist Wayne Barrett accused Stone of persuading Trump to publicly consider a run for the Reform Party nomination to sideline Buchanan, sabotage the Reform Party, and thus secure George W. Bush the nomination. Stone led an exploratory committee into a potential campaign in the 2000 presidential election. Stone's role in Trump's campaign is debated, although he was its manager. In 2008, Trump told The New Yorker, "He always tries taking credit for things he never did". During the election recount in Florida, Stone was recruited by James Baker and courted protesters. He has claimed that helped manage the Brooks Brothers riot in Miami-Dade County, Florida from a Winnebago; Brad Blakeman contends that he was the one in the Winnebago and didn't see Stone. In Down & Dirty: The Plot to Steal the Presidency (2001), Jake Tapper states that, while Stone was in the Winnebago, Blakeman led the operations. Following the election, Stone became involved with businessman Thomas Golisano's campaign in the 2002 New York gubernatorial election. During the 2004 presidential election, he was unexpectedly hired as an unpaid advisor to Democratic candidate Al Sharpton.

Stone was the subject of several controversies in the years following and including the 2004 presidential election. Campaign Extra! and journalist Dave Davies alleged that a series of yard signs linking Arlen Specter to Democratic candidate John Kerry were the work of Stone. Simultaneously, he was accused by then Democratic National Convention chairman Terry McAuliffe of forging the Killian memos at the center of a military service controversy regarding George W. Bush, an accusation he denied. In the most noteworthy of these controversies, lawyers representing Bernard Spitzer, Democratic gubernatorial candidate Eliot Spitzer's father, claimed that Stone threatened the elder Spitzer in an expletive-laden voicemail. Although he denied leaving the voicemail, he resigned from being then-New York State Senate majority leader Joseph Bruno's top advisor. Trump is quoted as saying that what Stone did was "ridiculous and stupid". In the Eliot Spitzer prostitution scandal, he claimed that the younger Spitzer wore knee-high black socks while having sex according to a letter he claimed he sent the Federal Bureau of Investigation (FBI); the FBI never received the letter, which surfaced after the scandal. In spite of authenticity issues, media organizations such as The New York Times ran with the story regardless. In 2008, he created a 527 group known as "Citizens United Not Timid", intentionally named to form the obscene acronym "CUNT", against then Democratic presidential candidate Hillary Clinton. The conservative organization Citizens United accused the group of using the success of Hillary: The Movie (2008), a film that would ultimately lead to Citizens United v. FEC (2010). After several months, Stone changed the name to "Citizens Uniformly Not Timid".

=== 2010–2014: Libertarian Party involvement and other political activity ===
In February 2010, Stone became campaign manager for Kristin Davis, a madam linked with the Eliot Spitzer prostitution scandal, in her bid for the Libertarian Party nomination for governor of New York in the 2010 election. Stone said that the campaign "is not a hoax, a prank or a publicity stunt. I want to get her a half-million votes." However, he later was spotted at a campaign rally for Republican gubernatorial candidate Carl Paladino, of whom Stone has spoken favorably. Stone admittedly had been providing support and advice to both campaigns on the grounds that the two campaigns had different goals: Davis was seeking to gain permanent ballot access for her party, and Paladino was in the race to win (and was Stone's preferred candidate). As such, Stone did not believe he had a conflict of interest in supporting both candidates. While working for the Davis campaign, Warren Redlich, the Libertarian nominee for Governor, alleged that Stone collaborated with a group entitled "People for a Safer New York" to send a flyer labeling Redlich a "sexual predator" and "sick, twisted pervert" on the basis of a blog post Redlich had made in 2008. Redlich later sued Stone in a New York court for defamation over the flyers, and sought $20 million in damages. However, the jury in the case returned a verdict in favor of Stone in December 2017, finding that Redlich failed to prove Stone was involved with the flyers.

Stone volunteered as an unpaid adviser to comedian Steve Berke ("a libertarian member of his so-called After Party") in his 2011 campaign for mayor of Miami Beach, Florida in 2012. Berke lost the race to incumbent Mayor Matti Herrera Bower.

In February 2012, Stone said that he had changed his party affiliation from the Republican Party to the Libertarian Party. Stone predicted a "Libertarian moment" in 2016 and the end of the Republican party.

In June 2012, Stone said that he was running a super PAC in support of former New Mexico governor and Libertarian presidential candidate Gary Johnson, whom he had met at a Reason magazine Christmas party two years earlier. Stone told The Huffington Post that Johnson had a real role to play, although "I have no allusions [sic] of him winning."

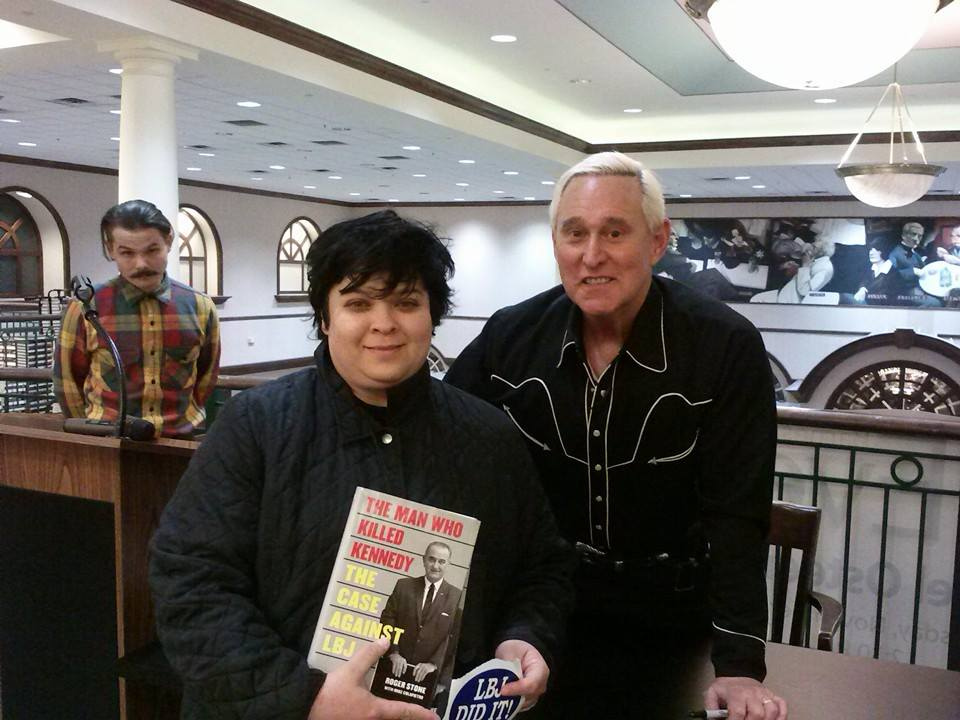
Stone with a fan in 2014

Stone considered running as a Libertarian candidate for governor of Florida in 2014, but in May 2013, he said in a statement that he would not run, and that he wanted to devote himself to campaigning in support of the 2014 Florida Amendment 2 referendum legalizing medical cannabis.

=== 2015–2019: Donald Trump campaign and media commentary ===
Roger Stone was an adviser to the 2016 presidential campaign of Donald Trump. He left the campaign in August 2015, with Stone saying he resigned and Trump saying he was fired. Despite this, Stone continued to support Trump. Stone wrote an op-ed for Business Insider on how Trump could still win. Even after being called a "stone-cold loser" by Trump in 2008, Trump later praised him on Alex Jones' radio show, which Stone arranged. Stone remained an informal adviser and media surrogate for Trump throughout the campaign.

Stone considered running in the 2016 United States Senate election in Florida for the Libertarian nomination but did not enter. During the 2016 campaign, Stone was banned from CNN and MSNBC after making offensive Twitter posts about TV personalities like Ana Navarro ("entitled diva bitch" and imagined her "killing herself") and Roland Martin ("stupid negro" and a "fat negro"). Erik Wemple, media writer for The Washington Post, described Stone's tweets as "nasty" and "bigoted". In June 2016, Stone admitted some regret for his comments on Martin.

In March 2016, the National Enquirer published a story about Ted Cruz's alleged extramarital affairs, quoting Stone. Cruz denied the claims and accused Stone and the Trump campaign of orchestrating a smear. Cruz called Stone a "dirty trickster" and said he encouraged violence, while Stone compared Cruz to Nixon and called him a liar.

In April 2016, Stone formed the pro-Trump group Stop the Steal and threatened "Days of Rage" if Republican leaders denied Trump the nomination at the Republican National Convention. The Washington Post reported Stone organized Trump supporters as a force of intimidation and threatened to publicize hotel room numbers of anti-Trump delegates, which Reince Priebus condemned.

After Trump was criticized by Khizr Khan at the 2016 Democratic National Convention, Stone defended Trump and accused Khan of sympathizing with the enemy. According to The Times of Israel, Stone was in contact with well-connected Israelis during the campaign, with one promising "critical intell[sic]."

The 2017 Netflix documentary Get Me Roger Stone focused on Stone's life and career. When asked about his sexuality, Stone replied, "I'm trysexual. I've tried everything". Stone criticized Saudi Arabia and Trump's visit to Riyadh, suggesting the Saudi government or royal family supported the September 11 attacks and should pay for them.

During the campaign, Stone promoted conspiracy theories, including the false claim that Huma Abedin was connected to the Muslim Brotherhood. In December 2018, Stone retracted a false claim that Guo Wengui had donated to Hillary Clinton.

On September 10, 2020, Stone told InfoWars that if Trump lost the 2020 United States presidential election, he should consider declaring martial law under the Insurrection Act, seize ballots in Nevada, and arrest business and political figures like Tim Cook, Mark Zuckerberg, and the Clintons, and shut down The Daily Beast for "seditious" activities. Stone also said the president should arrest The Daily Beast staff for "seditious" activities.

After the 2020 election, Stone spread false claims of voter fraud, including one about North Korean boats delivering ballots to Maine, which the Secretary of State of Maine dismissed as baseless. Stone called Trump "the greatest president since Abraham Lincoln" in a 2020 interview. Stone has said he would support Trump in a 2024 run and criticized Ron DeSantis for "disloyalty".

Stone supported Russia during its 2022 invasion of Ukraine, claiming Vladimir Putin was acting defensively to stop a non-existent U.S.-funded biological weapons program.

=== 2020s: Canada political organizing, radio host ===
On April 25, 2022, the Ontario Party announced that Stone had joined their campaign team as a Senior Strategic Advisor for the 2022 Ontario general election. According to the media release issued by the Ontario Party, Stone had previously joined party leader Derek Sloan to address the party's candidate convention and criticized Ontario Premier Doug Ford's approach to conservatism.

In June 2023, Stone launched The Roger Stone Show on WABC radio, which became syndicated in September 2024. Stone became a weekday host on WABC in February 2025.

== Proud Boys ties ==
In early 2018, ahead of an appearance at the annual Republican Dorchester Conference in Salem, Oregon, Stone sought out the Proud Boys, a radical right group known for street violence, to act as his "security" for the event; photos posted online showed Stone drinking with several Proud Boys. After his arraignment at the Miami federal courthouse in January 2019, they joined him on its steps holding signs that read, "Roger Stone is innocent," and promoting right-wing conspiracy theorist Alex Jones and his InfoWars website. Proud Boys founder Gavin McInnes said Stone was "one of the three approved media figures allowed to speak" about the group. When Stone was asked by a local reporter about the Proud Boys' claim that he had been initiated as a member of the group, he responded by calling the reporter a member of the Communist Party. He is particularly close to the group's former leader, Enrique Tarrio, who has commercially monetized his position. At a televised Trump rally in Miami, Florida, on February 18, 2019, Tarrio was seated directly behind President Trump wearing a "Roger Stone did nothing wrong" tee shirt.

The Washington Post reported in February 2021 that the Federal Bureau of Investigation (FBI) was investigating any role Stone might have had in influencing the Proud Boys and Oath Keepers in their participation in the 2021 storming of the United States Capitol.

== Connections with WikiLeaks and Russian espionage before the 2016 United States elections ==
Roger Stone indictment for one count of obstruction of an official proceeding, five counts of false statements, and one count of witness tampering

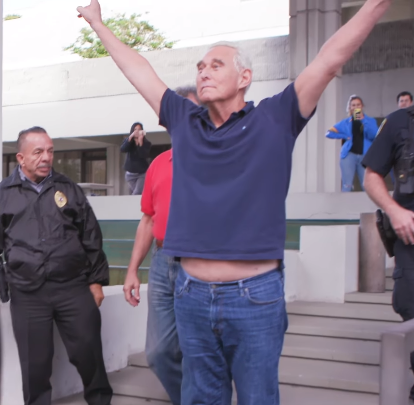
Stone making the V sign after his arrest and indictment, on January 25, 2019

During the 2016 campaign, Roger Stone was accused by Hillary Clinton 2016 presidential campaign chairman John Podesta of having prior knowledge of the publishing by WikiLeaks of Podesta's private emails obtained by Russian hackers. Stone tweeted before the leak, "It will soon [sic] the Podesta's time in the barrel." Five days before the leak, Stone tweeted, "Wednesday Hillary Clinton is done. #Wikileaks." Stone denied having advance knowledge of the Podesta email hack or any connection to Russian intelligence, stating his tweet referred to reports of the Podesta Group's ties to Russia. In his opening statement before the United States House Permanent Select Committee on Intelligence on September 26, 2017, Stone reiterated this claim.

Stone admitted he had established a back-channel with WikiLeaks founder Julian Assange to obtain information on Hillary Clinton, naming Randy Credico as his intermediary. A January 2019 indictment claimed Stone communicated with additional contacts knowledgeable about WikiLeaks' plans. The FBI investigated Stone's contacts with Russian operatives, including direct messaging with Guccifer 2.0, a persona linked to Russian military intelligence. U.S. intelligence agencies believe Guccifer 2.0 was a persona created by Russian intelligence to obscure its role in the DNC hack. The Guccifer 2.0 persona was ultimately linked to an IP address associated with the Russian military GRU intelligence agency in Moscow.

In March 2017, the Senate Intelligence Committee asked Stone to preserve all documents related to any Russian contacts. Stone denied wrongdoing and expressed willingness to testify. The Committee's final report in August 2020 found that Stone had access to WikiLeaks and that Trump had spoken to Stone and other associates about it multiple times. The Committee also found that WikiLeaks "very likely knew it was assisting a Russian intelligence influence effort".

=== Congressional testimony and social media conduct ===
On September 26, 2017, Stone testified before the House Intelligence Committee behind closed doors and made personal attacks on Democratic committee members. On October 28, 2017, Stone's Twitter account was suspended for targeted abuse of CNN personnel. Stone also sent threatening messages to witness Randy Credico, warning him against testifying and making threats regarding his safety and that of his dog.

=== Charges ===
==== Arrest and indictment ====
On January 25, 2019, Stone was arrested at his Fort Lauderdale, Florida home by FBI agents on seven criminal charges: one count of obstructing an official proceeding, five counts of false statements, and one count of witness tampering. He was released on a $250,000 bond and vowed to fight the charges, which he called politically motivated. Prosecutors alleged that after the first WikiLeaks release of hacked DNC emails in July 2016, a senior Trump campaign official was directed to contact Stone about any additional releases and determine what other damaging information WikiLeaks had regarding the Clinton campaign. Stone then told the Trump campaign about potential future releases of damaging material by WikiLeaks.

Stone decried the use of force at his home which included over a dozen agents wielding M4 rifles and wearing body armor. "I opened the door to automatic weapons," he said. The moment was captured by CNN leading to speculation they were tipped off. CNN said it was a combination of observation, reporting and good timing.

On February 18, 2019, Stone posted on Instagram a photo of the federal judge overseeing his case, Amy Berman Jackson, with what resembled rifle scope crosshairs next to her head. Later that day, Stone filed an apology with the court. Jackson then imposed a full gag order on Stone, citing her belief that Stone would "pose a danger" to others without the order.

==== Trial and conviction ====
Stone's trial began on November 6, 2019, at the United States District Court for the District of Columbia. Randy Credico testified that Stone urged and threatened him to prevent him from testifying to Congress. Stone had testified to Congress that Credico was his WikiLeaks go-between, but prosecutors said this was a lie in order to protect Jerome Corsi. During the November 12 testimony, former Trump campaign deputy chairman Rick Gates testified that Stone told campaign associates in April 2016 of WikiLeaks' plans to release documents, far earlier than previously known. Gates also testified that Trump had spoken with Stone about the forthcoming releases.

On November 15, 2019, after a week-long trial and two days of deliberations, the jury convicted Stone on all counts: obstruction, making false statements, and witness tampering.

==== Sentencing, intervention, and clemency ====
December 2020 pardon granted by Donald Trump

On February 20, 2020, Judge Amy Berman Jackson sentenced Stone to 40 months in federal prison and a $20,000 fine, but allowed him to delay the start of his sentence pending resolution of post-trial motions. The Justice Department's original recommendation of seven to nine years was reduced after intervention by senior officials, following public criticism by President Trump. This led to all four prosecutors withdrawing from the case. The intervention was widely criticized as political interference in the U.S. justice system.

On July 10, 2020, President Trump commuted Stone's sentence, removing his jail time days before he was to report to prison. On December 23, 2020, Trump issued a full pardon to Stone.

== 2020 United States presidential election, January 6 United States Capitol attack and later political career ==
On November 5, 2020, two days after the presidential election, Stone dictated a message saying that "any legislative body" that has "overwhelming evidence of fraud" can choose their own electors to cast Electoral College votes.

A video released to the public in August 2023 showed that Stone had been pushing to overturn the states' election results two days before the election was called for Joe Biden. According to the New Republic, this contradicted Donald Trump's defense that he and his allies genuinely believed they had won the race.

On December 12, at a Washington, DC rally, Stone urged followers to "fight until the bitter end". He appeared at the "Stop the Steal" rally on January 5, at Freedom Plaza, telling the crowd that the president's enemies sought "nothing less than the heist of the 2020 election and we say, No way!" And "... we will win this fight or America will step off into a thousand years of darkness. We dare not fail. I will be with you tomorrow shoulder to shoulder."

The Washington Post reported that video footage showed Stone meeting with the Oath Keepers, a militia group indicted for seditious conspiracy for their role in the storming of the Capitol, on the day of the attack. In the weeks afterwards he pressured the Trump administration for a pardon of all Members of Congress who supported overturning the 2020 election, including Ted Cruz, Josh Hawley, Jim Jordan, and Matt Gaetz.

On November 22, 2021, the House Select Committee on the January 6 Attack subpoenaed Stone and Alex Jones for testimony and documents by December 17 and 6, respectively. Stone agreed to appear before the committee, but invoked the Fifth Amendment and refused to answer the committee's questions during a 51 minute period. Stone also sued to prevent a subpoena of his AT&T cell phone metadata by the committee. The committee also revealed ties between Stone and the Proud Boys extremist group.

On December 23, 2021, Stone urged a judge to dismiss a lawsuit filed against him by eight Capitol Police officers, alleging that he is responsible for inciting a crowd of former President Donald Trump's supporters to riot on January 6, 2021. Video evidence later surfaced of him telling Trump supporters on November 2, 2020, that they had "the right to violence."

In January 2024, further controversy arose from a tape being released in which Stone discusses assassinating Democratic politicians Eric Swalwell and Jerry Nadler. Stone denied the recording as a "poorly fabricated AI-generated fraud", while it was reported that the US Capitol Police were investigating the matter after the audio's release.

In 2025, Stone accused the Navy veteran, former astronaut, and current Arizona Democratic Senator Mark Kelly of treason and called for his execution for questioning Trump's crypto connections, meme coins and activities.

== Personal life ==
Stone married his first wife Anne Elizabeth Wesche in 1974. Using the name Ann E.W. Stone, she founded the group Republicans for Choice in 1989. They divorced in 1990. Stone has been married to Nydia Bertran Stone since 1992.

In 1999, Stone credited his facial appearance to "decades of following a regimen of Chinese herbs, breathing therapies, tai chi and acupuncture."

=== Religious views ===
Stone was reportedly raised Catholic, although he said he strayed from the faith. However, while awaiting sentencing upon being found guilty as part of the Robert Mueller investigation, he received guidance from evangelist Franklin Graham. Graham reportedly advised Stone to confess his sins and accept Jesus as his saviour and Stone reportedly converted following his advice. In 2022, Stone repeatedly spoke at ReAwaken America Tour, a conservative Christian revival and statewide political tour.

In 2026, Stone and DCI Group were hired by the Nigerian government to lobby the US government to assist in protecting Christians being prosecuted in Nigeria.

=== Federal civil tax evasion suit ===
In April 2021, the Justice Department filed a civil suit against Stone and his wife to recover about $2 million (~$2.34 million in 2025) in alleged unpaid federal taxes, asserting they had used a commercial entity to shield their income and fund their personal expenses. In 2022, Stone agreed to pay more than $2 million in taxes as part of a settlement.

== Fashion ==
Stone commented on men's fashion in Stone on Style publishing his famous "Mr. Stone's Annual Best & Worst Dressed" list for a number of years, since Richard Blackwell, originator of the concept, passed away in 2008. Stone returned to published his list for the 16th year in 2024, after missing years in the 2020s for due to being "gagged from all public communication by a federal judge" and because his wife "had just been diagnosed with stage 4 cancer". He expounds on his fashion sense in his book Stone's Rules: How to Win at Politics, Business, and Style (Skyhorse Publishing, 2018) where he poses in his Rule #18: “White shirt + tan face = confidence” and in his Rule #51: “Casual dress doesn’t excuse bad taste—no sports jerseys unless you’re an athlete.”

Stone's personal style has been described as flamboyant. In a 2007 Weekly Standard profile written by Matt Labash, Stone was described as a "lord of mischief" and the "boastful black prince of Republican sleaze". Labash wrote that Stone "often sets his pronouncements off with the utterance 'Stone's Rules,' signifying to listeners that one of his shot-glass commandments is coming down, a pithy dictate uttered with the unbending certitude one usually associates with the Book of Deuteronomy." Examples of Stone's Rules include "Politics with me isn't theater. It's performance art, sometimes for its own sake."

Stone does not wear socks – a fact that Nancy Reagan brought to her husband's attention during his 1980 presidential campaign. Labash described him as "a dandy by disposition who boasts of having not bought off-the-rack since he was 17", who has "taught reporters how to achieve perfect double-dimples underneath their tie knots". Washington journalist Victor Gold has noted Stone's reputation as one of the "smartest dressers" in Washington. Stone's longtime tailor is Alan Flusser. Stone dislikes single-vent jackets (describing them as the sign of a "heathen"), saying he owns 100 silver-colored neckties and has 100 suits in storage. Fashion stories have been written about him in GQ and Penthouse. Stone has written of his dislike for jeans and ascots and has praised seersucker three-piece suits, as well as Madras jackets in the summertime and velvet blazers in the winter.

Stone wears a diamond pinky ring in the shape of a horseshoe and in 2007 he had Richard Nixon's face tattooed on his back. He has said: "I like English tailoring, I like Italian shoes. I like French wine. I like vodka martinis with an olive, please. I like to keep physically fit." Stone's office in Florida has been described as a "Hall of Nixonia" with framed pictures, posters, bongs, and letters associated with Nixon.

== Books ==
- Stone, Roger (November 4, 2013). The Man Who Killed Kennedy: The Case Against LBJ. New York City, New York: Skyhorse Publishing. ISBN 978-1626363137. (with Mike Colapietro)
- Stone, Roger (August 11, 2014). Nixon's Secrets: The Rise, Fall and Untold Truth about the President, Watergate, and the Pardon. New York City, New York: Skyhorse Publishing. ISBN 978-1629146034. (with Mike Colapietro)
- Stone, Roger (October 13, 2015). The Clintons' War on Women. New York City, New York: Skyhorse Publishing. ISBN 978-1510706781. (with Robert Morrow)
- Stone, Roger (February 16, 2016). Jeb! and the Bush Crime Family: The Inside Story of an American Dynasty. New York City, New York: Skyhorse Publishing. ISBN 978-1510706798. (with Saint John Hunt)
- Stone, Roger (January 31, 2017). The Making of the President 2016: How Donald Trump Orchestrated a Revolution. New York City, New York: Skyhorse Publishing. ISBN 978-1510726925. (paperback edition adds "Introduction 2019")
- Stone, Roger (May 8, 2018). Stone's Rules: How to Win at Politics, Business, and Style. New York City, New York: Skyhorse Publishing. ISBN 978-1510740082.
- Stone, Roger (February 19, 2019). The Myth of Russian Collusion: The Inside Story of How Donald Trump REALLY Won. New York City, New York: Skyhorse Publishing. ISBN 978-1510749368.

== See also ==
- Criminal charges brought in the Mueller special counsel investigation
- Links between Trump associates and Russian officials
- List of people granted executive clemency by Donald Trump
- Timeline of Russian interference in the 2016 United States elections
